= Sewer =

Sewer commonly refers to a part of sewerage, the infrastructure that conveys sewage.

Types of sewers include:

- Combined sewer
- Effluent sewer
- Gravity sewer
- Sanitary sewer
- Storm sewer
- Vacuum sewer

Other uses:

- Sewer, a royal or noble attendant who oversees meat or other dishes while dining
- Sewer, one who does sewing

== See also ==
- Sewage, wastewater produced by a community of people
- Sewer overflow (disambiguation)
