= Sewerage =

Infrastructure that conveys sewage or surface runoff using sewers

Map of London sewer network, late 19th century

Sewerage (or sewage system) is the infrastructure that conveys sewage or surface runoff (stormwater, meltwater, rainwater) using sewers. It encompasses components such as receiving drains, manholes, pumping stations, storm overflows, and screening chambers of the combined sewer or sanitary sewer. Sewerage ends at the entry to a sewage treatment plant or at the point of discharge into the environment. It is the system of pipes, chambers, manholes or inspection chamber, etc. that conveys the sewage or storm water.

In many cities, sewage (municipal wastewater or municipal sewage) is carried together with stormwater, in a combined sewer system, to a sewage treatment plant. In some urban areas, sewage is carried separately in sanitary sewers and runoff from streets is carried in storm drains. Access to these systems, for maintenance purposes, is typically through a manhole. During high precipitation periods a sewer system may experience a combined sewer overflow event or a sanitary sewer overflow event, which forces untreated sewage to flow directly to receiving waters. This can pose a serious threat to public health and the surrounding environment.

The system of sewers is called sewerage or sewerage system in British English and sewage system or sewer system in American English.

== History ==
It was likely the need to get rid of foul smells rather than an understanding of the health hazards of human waste that led to the first proper sewage systems. Most settlements grew next to natural waterways into which waste from latrines was readily channeled, but the emergence of major cities exposed the inadequacy of this approach. Early civilizations like the Babylonians dug cesspits below floor level in their houses and created drainage systems for removing storm water.

It was not until 2000 BC in the Indus valley civilization that networks of precisely made brick-lined sewage drains were constructed along the streets to convey waste from homes. Toilets in homes on the street side were connected directly to these street sewers and were flushed manually with clean water. Centuries later, major cities such as Rome and Constantinople built increasingly complex networked sewer systems, some of which are still in use. It was after the construction of the sewer systems that people realized the reduction of health hazards.

== Components and types ==
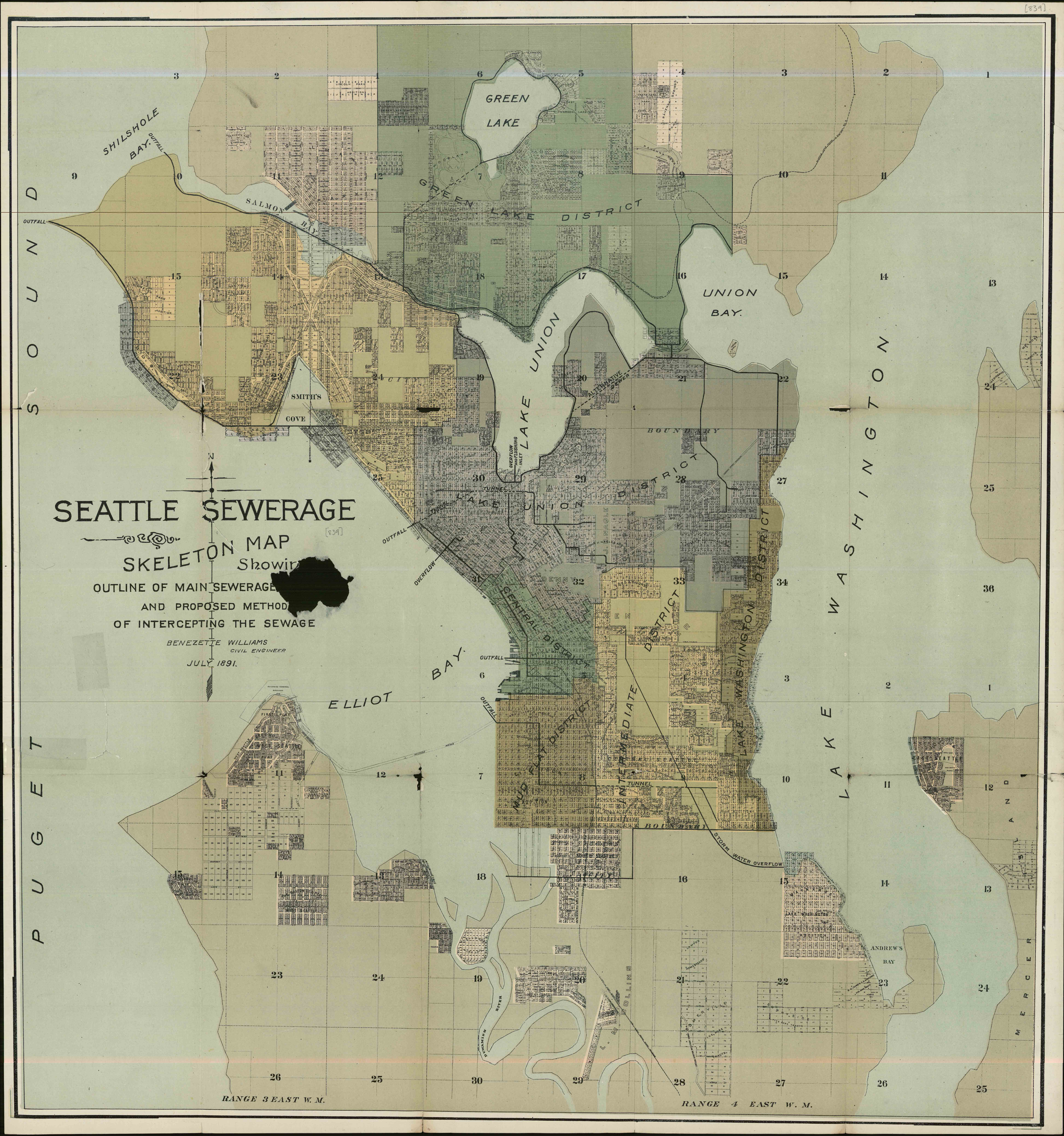
Map of Seattle sewer districts, 1894

The main part of such a system is made up of large pipes (i.e., the sewers, or "sanitary sewers") that convey the sewage from the point of production to the point of treatment or discharge.

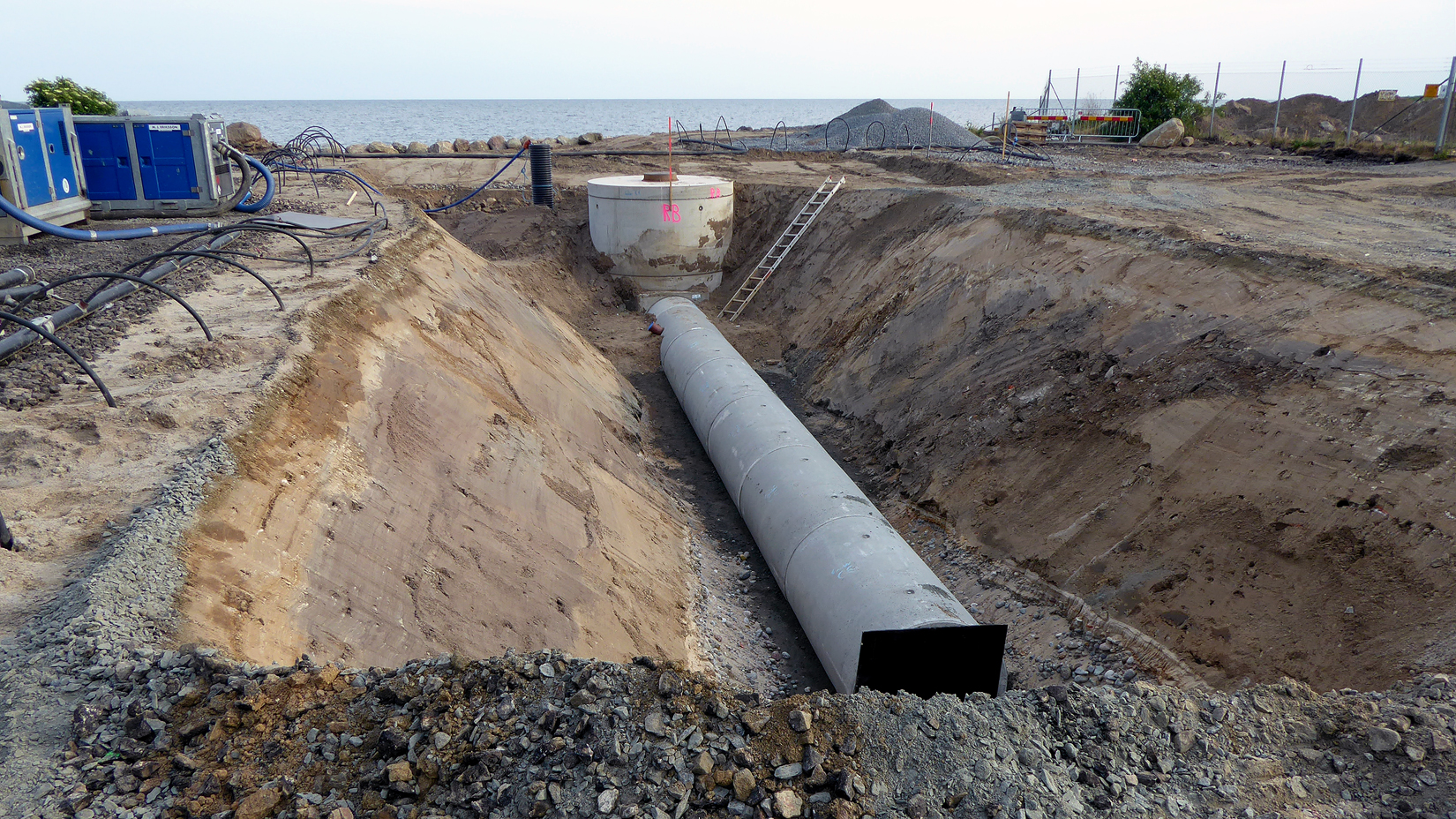
Sewers under construction in Ystad, Sweden

Types of sanitary sewer systems that all usually are gravity sewers include:

- Combined sewer
- Simplified sewerage
- Storm drain

Sanitary sewers not relying solely on gravity include:

- Vacuum sewer
- Effluent sewer
- Pressure sewer

Where a sewerage system has not been installed, sewage may be collected from homes by pipes into septic tanks or cesspits, where it may be treated or collected in vehicles and taken for treatment or disposal (a process known as fecal sludge management).

== Maintenance and rehabilitation ==
Severe constraints are applied to sewerage, which may result in premature deterioration. These include root intrusion, joint displacement, cracks, and hole formations that lead to a significant volume of leakage with an overall risk for the environment and public health. For example, it is estimated that 500 million m^{3} of contaminated water per year can leak into soil and ground-water in Germany. The rehabilitation and replacement of damaged sewers is very costly. Annual rehabilitation costs for Los Angeles County are about €400 million, and in Germany, these costs are estimated to be €100 million.

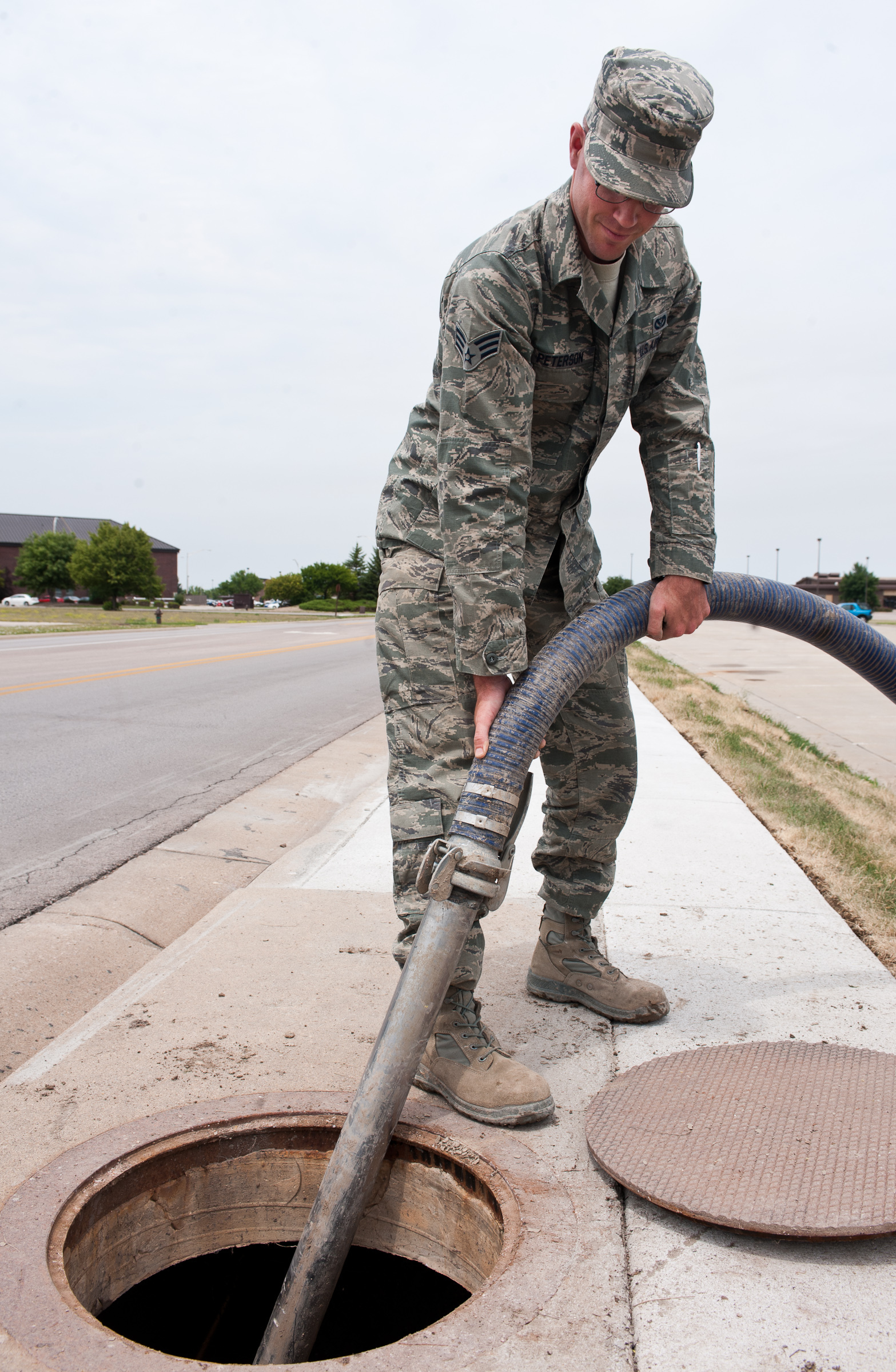
Vacuuming debris from a sewer line

Hydrogen sulfide (H_{2}S) is indirectly responsible for biogenic sulfide corrosion of iron sewers and consequently such sewers need rehabilitation work. Various repair options are available to owners over a large range of costs and potential durability. One option is the application of a cementitious material based on calcium aluminate cement, after a cleaning of the corroded structure to remove loose material and contaminants in order to expose a sound, rough and clean substrate. Depending on the concrete condition and contamination, the cleaning can range from simple high pressure jet water cleaning (200 bar) up to real hydro-demolition (2000 bars).

One method to ensure sound concrete is exposed is to verify that the surface pH is superior to 10.

As for any concrete repair, the state-of-the-art rules must be followed. After this cleaning step, the cementitious material is applied to the saturated-surface-dry substrate using either:

- Low pressure wet spray: this method is the more common because it does not produce dust and virtually no material is lost by rebound. It utilizes classical facade rotor pump, easily available in the market. The main drawback is the limited pumping distance that cannot exceed 75 meters.
- Spinning head wet spray: this method is similar to the first, but the manual spraying is replaced by a spinning head projecting the mortar onto the repaired surface. This method is fast and especially suited for cylindrical chambers such as manholes. When a structure is so severely corroded that human entry is a risk, spinning head application permits an “un-manned” consolidation of the manhole.
- High pressure dry spray: this method, also called “shotcrete” or “gunite” is allowing a faster rate of rehabilitation, and also to make a thicker application in a single pass. The main interest of dry shotcrete is the capacity to pump the mortar over a long distance and this is needed when the access points are distant. Perhaps the longest dry shotcrete distance is a job site in Australia in 2014, where 100% calcium aluminate mortar was air transported over 800 meters before being sprayed. The main drawback with dry shotcrete is the generation of dust and rebound; these could be limited and controlled with appropriate means (pre-moisture ring, adapted aggregate grading, experienced nozzleman, water mist cut-off walls, etc.).

== Challenges ==
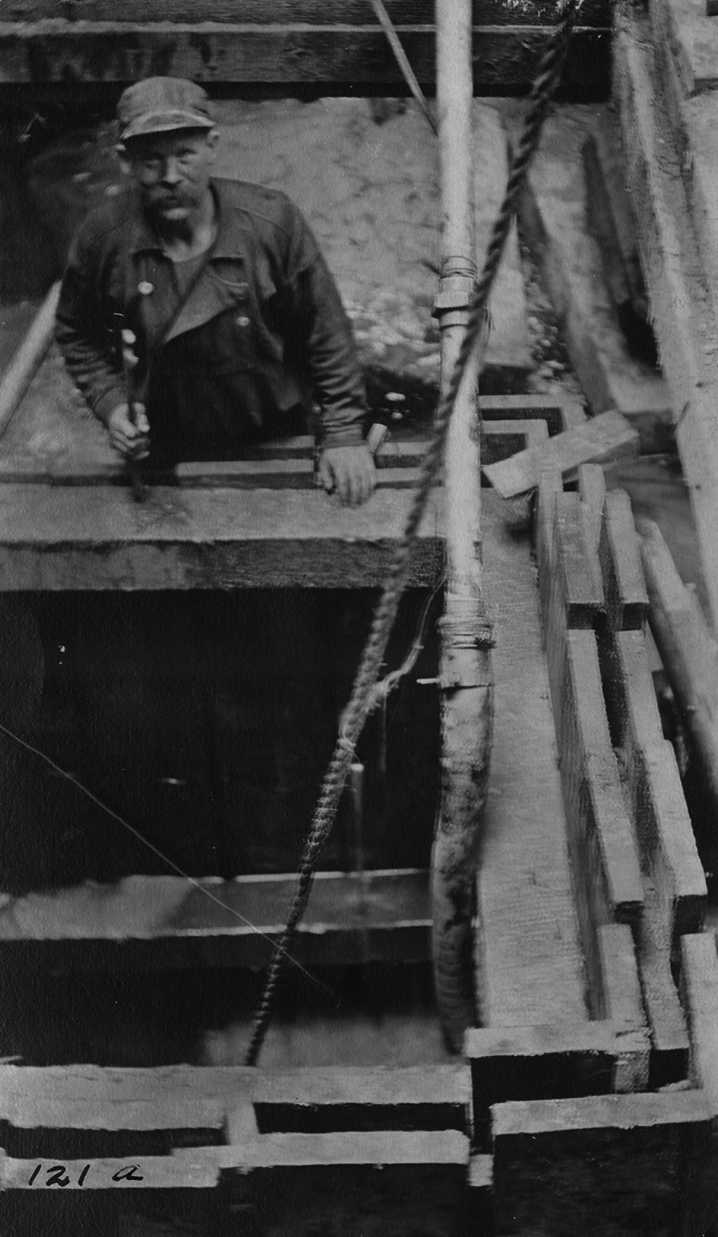
Building a sewer in newly filled land on former tideflats in Seattle, 1910.

=== Water table ===
Sewer system infrastructure often reduces the water table in areas, especially in densely populated areas where rainwater (from house roofs) is directly piped into the system, as opposed to being allowed to be absorbed by the soil. In certain areas it has resulted in a significant lowering of the water table. In the example of Belgium, a lowering of the water table by 100 meters has been the result. The freshwater that is accumulated by the system is then piped to the sea. In areas where this is a concern, vacuum sewers may be used instead, due to the shallow excavation that is possible for them.

=== Lack of infrastructure ===
In many low-income countries, sewage may in some cases drain directly into receiving water bodies without the existence of sewerage systems. This can cause water pollution, along with spreading pathogens. Some chemicals pose risks at very low concentrations and can remain a threat for long periods of time because of bioaccumulation in animal or human tissue.

== Regulations ==
In many European countries, citizens are obliged to connect their home sanitation to the national sewerage where possible. This has resulted in large percentages of the population being connected. For example, the Netherlands have 99% of the population connected to the system, and 1% has an individual sewage disposal system or treatment system, e.g., septic tank. Others have slightly lower (although still substantial) percentages; e.g., 96% for Germany.

== Trends ==
Current approaches to sewage management may include handling surface runoff separately from sewage, handling greywater separately from blackwater (flush toilets), and coping better with abnormal events (such as peaks stormwater volumes from extreme weather).

== See also ==
- History of water supply and sanitation
- List of water supply and sanitation by country
- Sanitary sewer overflow – Discharge of untreated sewage
- Sanitation – Public health conditions related to clean water and proper excreta and sewage disposal
- Sewer mining – Sewage that is being pumped from a trunk sewer and treated on-site
- Pollution – Adverse environmental contamination
