= Vitrified clay pipe =

Clay and shale pipe

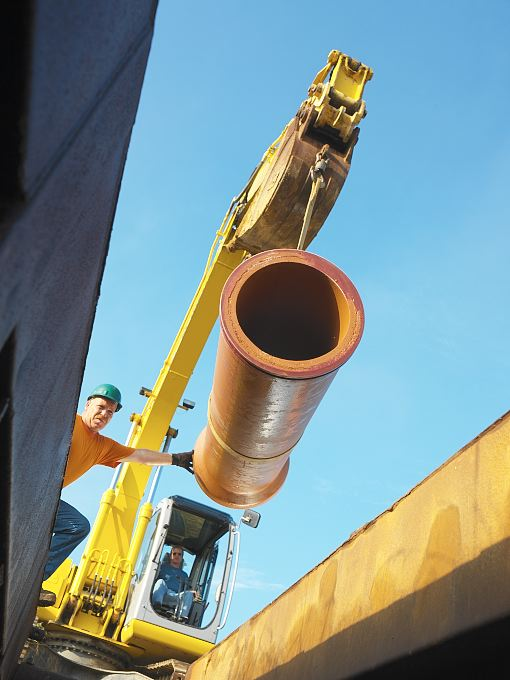
Bell & Spigot Pipe manufactured in the U.S. going into the trench

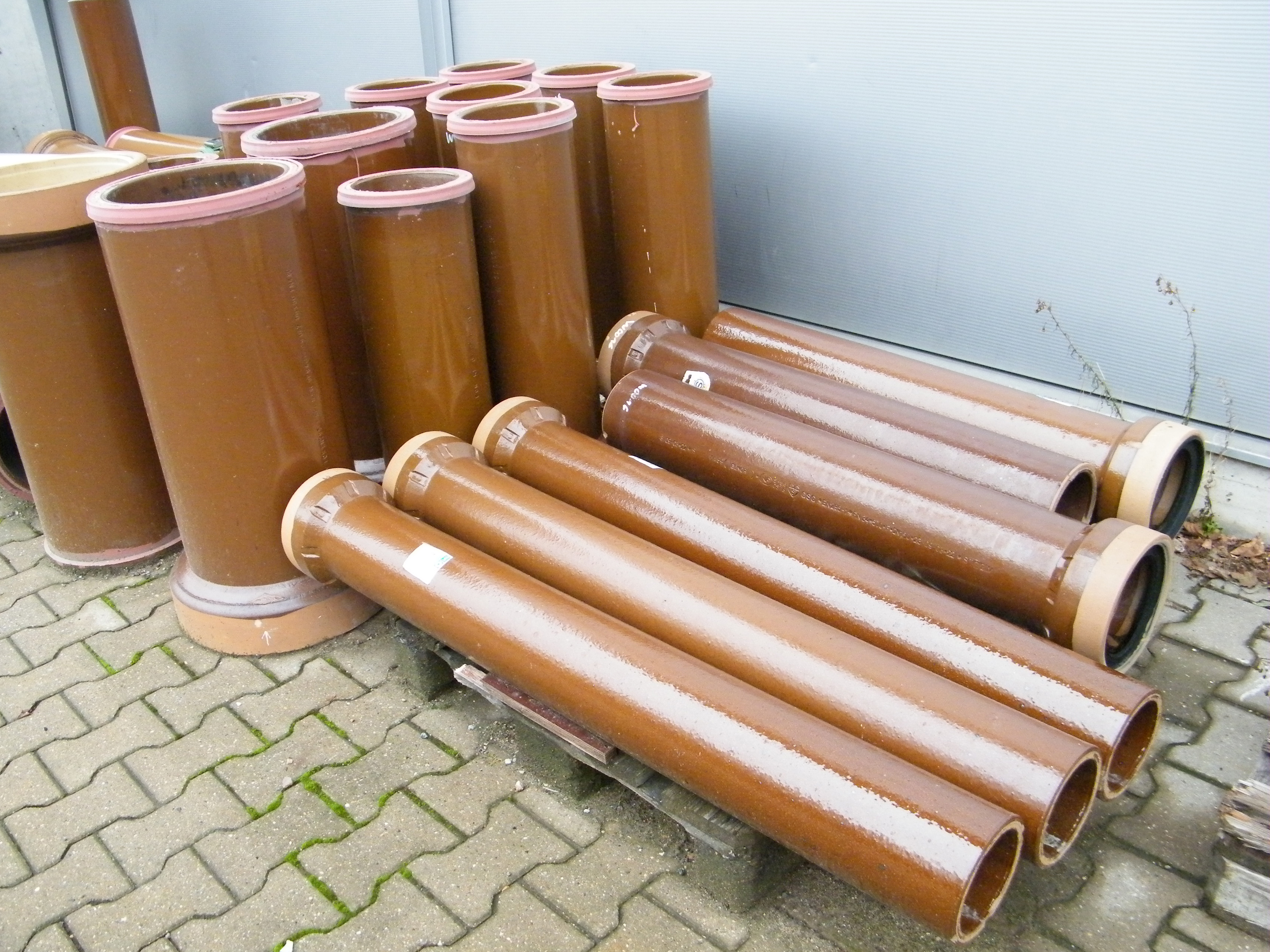
Glazed ceramic pipes, manufactured in the EU

Vitrified clay pipe (VCP) is pipe made from a blend of clay and shale that has been subjected to high temperature to achieve vitrification, which results in a hard, inert ceramic.

VCP is commonly used in gravity sewer collection mains because of its long life and resistance to almost all domestic and industrial sewage, particularly the sulfuric acid that is generated by hydrogen sulfide, a common component of sewage. Only hydrofluoric acid and highly concentrated caustic wastes are known to attack VCP. Such wastes would not be permitted to be discharged into a municipal sewage collection system without adequate pretreatment.

While clay pipe has been used in sewer systems for thousands of years it has become less common in the U.S. since the adoption of the Clean Water Act in 1972 which authorized funding for modernization of sewage systems.

== Production ==
VCP pipe is made by forming clay then heating it to 2000 degrees Fahrenheit (1100 degrees Celsius) in large gas fired kilns which vitrify the raw material. In some areas the pipe is also glazed to ensure that it will be water-tight.

== Benefits and Challenges ==
The primary benefit of using VCP in sanitary sewers is its long service life. Also, it is not manufactured from petrochemicals, and has a lower energy requirement per linear foot compared to plastic alternatives, which are important to some consumers.

VCP allows for more aggressive cleaning methods than can be used on plastic pipes, which prolongs the service life of a sewer line. Cleaning and maintenance of sewage pipes reduce or prevent Sanitary Sewer Overflows (SSOs), which are an area of concern for the US EPA and a potential area of liability for municipalities.

However, it is much heavier than plastic alternatives and has more joints over a given length of sewage line, which can make it more expensive in terms of upfront costs. It is also more brittle than plastic which can lead to cracking of the pipes and leakage.
