= Condominial sewerage =

Condominial sewerage is the application of simplified sewerage coupled with consultations and ongoing interactions between users and agencies during planning and implementation. The term is used primarily in Latin America, particularly in Brazil, and is derived from the term condominio, which means housing block.

From a pure engineering perspective there is no difference between designing a regular sewage system and a condominial one. However, bureaucratically a condominial system includes the participation of the individuals and owners who will be served and can often result in lower costs due to shorter runs of piping. This is achieved by local concentration of sewage from a single "housing block". Thus a number of dwellings are grouped into a "block" known as a condominium. The condominium may share no other aspects of ownership or relation except geographic proximity. In addition, individuals and owners may share a role in the maintenance of the sewers at the block level.
