= Sewer overflow =

Sewer overflow may refer to:

- Combined sewer overflow
- Sanitary sewer overflow
