= Pressure sewer =

A pressure sewer is a pump-driven method for moving sewage up from the waste source into a gravity sewer or directly to a sewage treatment plant. Pressure sewers are typically used where properties are located below the level of the nearest gravity sewer or are located on terrain that makes conventional large bore sewer pipes impractical.

== Operation ==
In a typical set-up, a receiving well is provided close to the properties being served so that all sewage can gravitate to the well. An electric macerator pump (also called a grinder pump) macerates the sewage and pumps it through a small diameter plastic pipe that discharges into a gravity sewer or treatment plant. Pump operation can be controlled by a float switch in the well. The well is sized to allow for periods of power outage and pump maintenance. The discharge pipe may be as small as 50 mm diameter moving sewage at high flow rates.

Pressure sewers are also used to collect the discharge from septic tanks and discharge this into the local gravity sewer instead of releasing it into a leach field, protecting ground water from contamination.

== Advantages ==
Pressure sewers enable properties constructed below the nearest gravity main to connect to the local sewerage system avoiding the need for a septic tank or cesspit.

In areas where washouts or earthquakes are common, conventional earthenware or cast iron sewerage system may be prone to breakage and leakage. The plastic discharge pipe of a pressure sewer is much more robust and can accommodate substantial movements in the ground without failing.

Costs can be lower than conventional sewers since the pipework is much cheaper and there is no requirement for manholes or other intermediate infrastructure. Installation costs can be low as the pipes can be situated close to the surface and installed using no-dig methods such as moleing.

== Disadvantages ==
The pumping well and pump controls require expert maintenance. Electricity is required to power the pump that typically falls on the local house-holder(s). Although the well is typically designed to accommodate several days worth of effluent, failure of the pump or of the local electricity supply for an extended period results in well overflow.
