= Infiltration and inflow =

Groundwater entering sanitary sewers

Infiltration and inflow (I/I or I&I) is the process of groundwater, or water from sources other than domestic wastewater, entering sanitary sewers. I/I causes dilution in sanitary sewers, which decreases the efficiency of treatment, and may cause sewage volumes to exceed design capacity. Although inflow is technically different from infiltration, it may be difficult to determine which is causing dilution problems in inaccessible sewers. The United States Environmental Protection Agency considers infiltration and inflow to be combined contributions from both.

== Background ==
Early combined sewers used surface runoff to dilute waste from toilets and carry it away from urban areas into natural waterways. Sewage treatment can remove some pollutants from toilet waste, but treatment of diluted flow from combined sewers produces larger volumes of treated sewage with similar pollutant concentrations. Modern sanitary sewers are designed to transport domestic and industrial wastewater directly to treatment facilities without dilution.

== Infiltration ==
Groundwater entering sanitary sewers through defective pipe joints and broken pipes is called infiltration. Pipes may leak because of careless installation; they may also be damaged after installation by differential ground movement, heavy vehicle traffic on roadways above the sewer, careless construction practices in nearby trenches, or degradation of the sewer pipe materials. In general, volume of leakage will increase over time. Damaged and broken sewer cleanouts are a major cause of infiltration into municipal sewer systems.

Infiltration will occur where local groundwater elevation is higher than the sewer pipe. Gravel bedding materials in sewer pipe trenches act as a French drain. Groundwater flows parallel to the sewer until it reaches the area of damaged pipe. In areas of low groundwater, sewage may exfiltrate into groundwater from a leaking sewer.

== Inflow ==
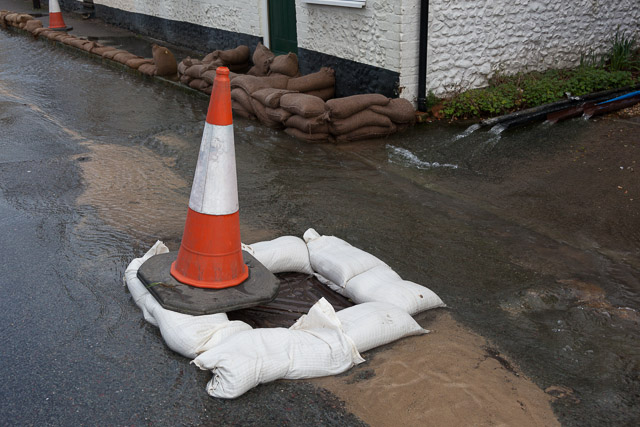
Sanitary manhole inflow due to a flood

Water entering sanitary sewers from inappropriate connections is called inflow. Typical sources include sump pumps, roof drains, cellar drains, and yard drains where urban features prevent surface runoff, and storm drains are not conveniently accessible or identifiable. Inflow tends to peak during precipitation events, and causes greater flow variation than infiltration. Peak flows caused by inflow may generate a foul flush of accumulated biofilm and sanitary solids scoured from the dry weather wetted perimeter of oversized sewers during peak flow turbulence. Sources of inflow can sometimes be identified by smoke testing. Smoke is blown into the sewer during dry weather while observers watch for smoke emerging from yards, cellars, or roof gutters.

== Significance ==
Dilution of sewage directly increases costs of pumping and chlorination, ozonation, or ultraviolet disinfection. Physical treatment structures including screens and pumps must be enlarged to handle the peak flow. Primary clarifiers must also be enlarged to treat average flows, although primary treatment of peak flows may be accomplished in detention basins. Biological secondary treatment is effective only while the concentration of soluble and colloidal pollutants (typically measured as biochemical oxygen demand or BOD) remains high enough to sustain a population of microorganisms digesting those pollutants. In U.S. federal regulations, secondary treatment is expected to remove 85 percent of soluble and colloidal organic pollutants from sewage containing 200 mg/L BOD. BOD removal by conventional biological secondary treatment becomes less effective with dilution and practically ceases as BOD concentrations entering the treatment facility are diluted below about 20 mg/L. Unremoved organics are potentially converted to disinfection by-products by chemical disinfection prior to discharge.

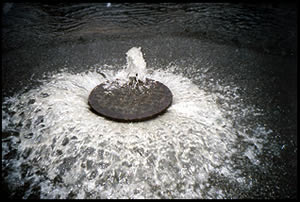
Excessive infiltration and inflow may cause sanitary sewer overflows during wet weather.

High rates of infiltration and inflow may make the sanitary sewer incapable of carrying sewage from the design service area. Sewage may back up into the lowest homes during wet weather, or street manholes may overflow.

== Correction ==
Smoke test results may not correlate well with flow volumes; although they can identify potential problem locations. Where sewage flow is expected to be relatively uniform, significance of infiltration and inflow may be estimated by comparison of sewage flow at the same point during wet and dry weather or at two sequential points within the sewer system. Small areas with large flow differences can be identified if the sewer system provides adequate measuring locations. It may be necessary to replace a section of sewer line if flow differences cannot be corrected by removing identified connections.
