= Simplified sewerage =

Type of small-bore sewerage system

Schematic of a simplified sewer: Smaller-diameter pipes are laid at a shallower depth and at a flatter gradient than for conventional sewers.

Simplified sewerage, also called small-bore sewerage, is a sewer system that collects all household wastewater (blackwater and greywater) in small-diameter pipes laid at fairly flat gradients. Simplified sewers are laid in the front yard or under the pavement (sidewalk) or – if feasible – inside the back yard, rather than in the centre of the road as with conventional sewerage. It is suitable for existing unplanned low-income areas, as well as new housing estates with a regular layout. It allows for a more flexible design. With simplified sewerage it is crucial to have management arrangements in place to remove blockages, which are more frequent than with conventional sewers.

Simplified sewerage is sometimes also referred to as conventional sewerage with appropriate standards, implying that most conventional sewers are overdesigned.

The concept of simplified sewerage emerged in parallel in Natal, Brazil and Karachi, Pakistan in the early 1980s without any interaction or communication. In both cases particular emphasis was given to community mobilization, an essential element for the success of simplified sewerage. In Latin America, and particularly in Brazil, simplified sewerage is also known as condominial sewerage, a term that underscores the importance of community participation in planning and maintenance at the level of a housing block (known as condominio in the Spanish and Portuguese use of the term).

== Background ==
In developing countries, connection to sewer systems is often costly for poor households, despite typically low monthly sewer tariffs. This apparent paradox is explained by the high costs of in-plot and in-house sanitary installations that have to be paid entirely by the user, by sometimes high sewer connection fees levied by utilities, and by a lack of community consultation. As a result, in many cities in developing countries conventional sewers are laid at high costs under a street, while many users on that street do not connect to them. In Brazil, in some cities connection rates in the early 1990s were less than 40% of the intended beneficiary population.

== Application ==
Simplified sewerage is most widely used in Brazil. It is estimated that in Brazil some five million people in over 200 towns and cities are served with simplified sewerage – or condominial sewerage. This corresponds to about 3% of the population of Brazil and about 6% of the population connected to sewers. They serve poor and rich alike.

Simplified sewerage has also been used in

- Bolivia, beginning with a pilot project in El Alto;
- Honduras, primarily in marginal areas of Tegucigalpa where simplified sewerage has been introduced in 20 communities with 24,000 inhabitants;
- Peru, primarily in marginal areas of Lima;
- in South Africa, where pilot projects were carried out in Johannesburg and Durban;
- in Sri Lanka, where the National Housing Development Authority implemented over 20 schemes in the 1980s and 90s.

In Pakistan, beginning with the Orangi Pilot Project in Karachi, a variation of simplified sewerage using larger diameter pipes has been used.

== Community participation ==
Community participation in the planning of any sewer system is a fundamental requirement to achieve higher household connection rates and to increase the likelihood of proper maintenance of in-block sewers. In addition, it can motivate users to assume parts of the costs of the sewer system that they are able to assume, such as contribution of labor for construction and/or maintenance.

Typically, in the planning process for a simplified sewerage system, meetings are carried out at the housing block (condominio) level for information, discussions and clarifications required for a joint group decision on network design, community contributions during construction and maintenance responsibilities. Users might finance and implement in-house sanitary installations and household connections and would agree on a suitable type of condominial branch. They are asked to comply with agreements established for construction and operation of the condominial branch, as well as payment of tariffs. In turn, the service provider agrees to fulfill his responsibilities as established in the “Terms of Connection ” between the parties. The community participation process also provides a good opportunity for complementary actions like hygiene promotion, which can have a significant impact on public health at a relatively limited cost.

== Design and construction ==
Simplified sewers are usually laid in the front yard or under the pavement (sidewalk). In some rare cases it is possible to lay them in the back yard. Sidewalk branches are usually preferred in regular urbanizations, while the front and back yard branches are particularly suited to neighborhoods with challenging topography or urbanization patterns. However, in some cases neither of these options is possible. For example, in South Asia, in many cities there is no sidewalk or front yard, so pipes have to be laid in the middle of the street as with conventional sewers.

In Latin America typical simplified sewer diameters are 100 mm, laid at a gradient of 1 in 200 (0.5 percent). Such a sewer will serve around 200 households of five people each with a wastewater flow of 80 litres per person per day. In Pakistan, however, there are no rigorous standards for sewer diameters. In a small pilot as part of the Orangi Pilot Project pipes with a diameter of 150mm were used.

Laying small-diameter pipes at fairly flat gradients requires careful construction techniques. Plastic pipes are best used as they are more easily jointed correctly. This reduces wastewater leakage from the sewer and groundwater infiltration into it. With simplified sewerage there is no need to have the large expensive manholes of the type used for conventional sewerage – simple brick or plastic junction chambers are used instead.

Construction can be carried out by contractors or by trained and properly supervised community members. Training and proper supervision are actually needed in both cases, since contractors in many cities are not familiar with simplified sewerage.

== Investment cost comparison ==
The cost of sewerage – conventional or simplified – is always site-specific, and estimates are subject to controversies. Investment cost savings come from various design features that may or may not be present in a particular simplified sewerage system. Cost-saving features of any simplified sewerage system are a smaller diameter of pipes, smaller and shallower trenches and simplified manholes. The two latter features are estimated to account for most of the cost savings. Other features that could further reduce costs may only be present in some systems, such as:

- shorter networks;
- avoidance of the need to damage pavements and sidewalks (if they already exist and if pipes are laid in front or back yards);
- decentralized, small-scale wastewater treatment, and consequently elimination of main collectors and sewage pumping stations.

An element that may slightly increase costs compared to conventional sewerage is the introduction of grease traps or of interceptor chambers for the settlement of sludge. The latter are more common in South Asia and are not used in the condominial model. A 2006 study of four countries showed cost savings of 31–57% from the use of simplified sewerage compared to conventional sewerage with unit costs varying from US$119 per connection in a neighborhood in Bolivia and to US$759 per connection in a small town in Paraguay. A detailed estimate gives the costs of simplified sewerage in Lima as at least US$700 per household (US$120–140 per person), including in-house sanitary facilities (US$100 per household) and including design, supervision and social intermediation costs (US$126 per household, which are common costs shared with water infrastructure), but excluding taxes.

In general, at higher population densities sewer systems are cheaper than on-site sanitation (such as septic tanks). The switching value at which sewerage becomes less costly is largely determined by the type of sewerage, conventional or simplified. A 1983 study in Natal showed that the investment costs for simplified sewerage were lower than for on-site systems at the quite low population density of about 160 people per hectare. Conventional sewerage, however, was cheaper only at densities above 400 people per hectare.

== Operation and maintenance ==
Good operation and maintenance (O&M) is essential for the long-term sustainability of any sewerage system, but particularly for simplified sewerage, since the small diameter of pipes and low gradients make the system highly vulnerable to clogging. Solids can readily block the small diameter piping and the shallow grade of pipe alignment prevents sewage flow from reaching scouring velocity, meaning that solids fall out of suspension and depositing within the low gradient pipe before reaching the downstream receiving body.

The original concept of householders being responsible for O&M of in-block condominial sewers has not worked well in the long term. A study of simplified sewerage systems in Brazil has shown that effective maintenance of sewers by utilities has often been the result of community pressure by neighborhood associations. Without such pressure maintenance by utilities has often been inadequate, and community maintenance has not come about either.

Few situation exist where simplified sewers are appropriate sanitation solutions to install. Therefore, alternative management systems had to be developed to mitigate the high issues of simplified sewers, and a few examples are provided below:

- In rural Ceará a villager is employed by the Residents’ Association to maintain the sewers and the wastewater treatment plant (typically, a single facultative waste stabilization pond). He is also responsible for the water supply.
- In parts of Recife in northeast Brazil the state water and sewerage company employs local contracting firms for O&M. Usually this is done by a small team comprising a technician engineer and two laborers who work in a low-income area served by simplified sewerage and to whom residents report any problems.
- In Brasília the water and sewerage company, which has over 1,200 km of condominial sewers, uses van-mounted water jet units to clear any blockages.

Concerning maintenance costs, available information indicates similar costs and requirements for the simplified and the conventional system under the same conditions. Simplified systems typically require more interventions, but the cost per intervention is lower. Comparative analytical studies are not yet available, however.

== Constraints for application ==
According to Jose Carlos Melo, who is considered to be the "father" of condominial sewers in Brazil, some important constraints for the application of simplified sewerage are:

- Lack of information on fundamentals and techniques of the approach or lack of experience in its application,
- Resistance to change: Institutional, technical and operational changes required by the service provider for implementing the condominial approach usually provoke resistance and can hinder the application.
- Normative and legal restrictions: Existing conservative design and construction standards linked to conventional systems can be an essential constraint in the introduction and dissemination of the systems.

Over the last years, countries like Bolivia and Peru reviewed and modernized technical standards according to methods and criteria established and accepted in Brazil in the 1980s, thus overcoming the latter constraint.

== See also ==
- Effluent sewer or solids-free sewer
