= Sewer mining =

Sewage that is being pumped from a trunk sewer and treated on-site

Sewer mining (or sewage mining) is a concept where municipal wastewater (sewage) is pumped from a trunk sewer and treated on-site to accommodate a range of local, nonpotable water needs. It is a strategy for combating water scarcity. It combines decentralized wastewater management and water reclamation. Since 2012, it is used as a tool for improving water management and promoting reuse of water in Australia.

== Design ==
A sewer mining scheme typically consists of:

- A connection to the central wastewater system for the purpose of extracting wastewater.
- A small network of pipes to convey wastewater to the treatment location.
- A sewage treatment plant that produces two flows: recycled water and sewage sludge.
- A pipeline system for reclaimed water distribution to the end-point or reuse.
- A discharge pipeline or a system that manages produced residuals, such as sewage sludge.

== Advantages ==
One of the advantages of sewer mining is the decrease in transportation costs, since sewage can be treated locally. Another benefit derives from the fact that no further capital costs for sewer infrastructure are needed, because a treatment scheme can be directly linked to the already existing pipeline system. With the combination of new, emerging technologies, such as the membrane bioreactor (MBR), further reduction of operating costs became possible, making the average cost of retrieved water comparable to potable water costs.

== Examples ==
=== Australia ===
Most of sewer mining cases are realised in Australia and involve residential non-drinking uses. More specifically, in Sydney Olympic Park, a large scale sewer mining unit has been installed for using recycled water for irrigational purposes. The retrieved water is being produced in such quantities that substitutes more than 50% of the potable water that would be sustaining green sites in the Sydney Olympic Park and the Newington Estate. Another realisation of sewer mining takes place in Pennant Hills Golf Club, where the recycling scheme produced up to 100 million litres of reclaimed water that is used for irrigating the golf course. In this case, the nutrients from the sewage are used as fertilizer on the golf course rather than being removed in a sewage treatment plant.

=== Greece ===
In Greece, an example that applies sewer mining as a decentralised wastewater treatment method is the DESSIN Athens pilot plant, which is implemented under the European Union Seventh Framework Programme. The Athens demonstration site pumps municipal sewage directly from the central sewage network and treats it by the use of a membrane bioreactor, while a reverse osmosis unit assures that the water quality lies within the legislation limits. The treated effluent is used to irrigate a nearby area of 50 square meters.

== See also ==
- Resource recovery
