= Sanitary sewer =

Underground pipe for transporting sewage

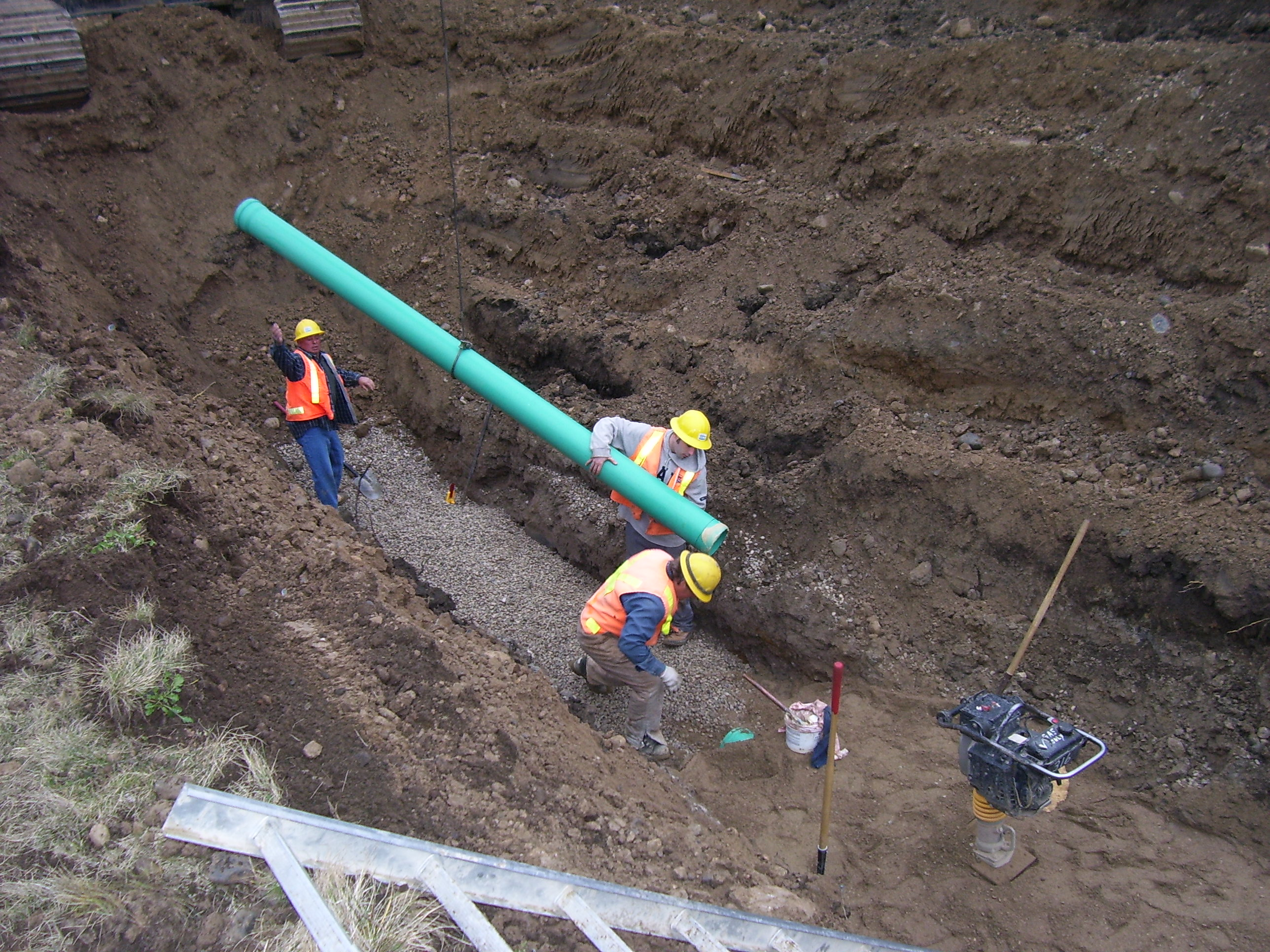
Sanitary sewer installation with PVC pipe. Sanitary sewers are sized to carry the amount of sewage generated by the collection area. These sewers are much smaller than combined sewers, which are designed to also carry surface runoff.

A sanitary sewer is an underground pipe or tunnel system for transporting sewage from houses and commercial buildings (but not stormwater) to a sewage treatment plant or disposal.

Sanitary sewers are a type of gravity sewer and are part of an overall system called a "sewage system" or sewerage. Sanitary sewers serving industrial areas may also carry industrial wastewater. In municipalities served by sanitary sewers, separate storm drains may convey surface runoff directly to surface waters. An advantage of sanitary sewer systems is that they avoid combined sewer overflows. Sanitary sewers are typically much smaller in diameter than combined sewers which also transport urban runoff. Backups of raw sewage can occur if excessive stormwater inflow or groundwater infiltration occurs due to leaking joints, defective pipes etc. in aging infrastructure.

== Purpose ==
Sewage treatment is less effective when sanitary waste is diluted with stormwater, and combined sewer overflows occur when runoff from heavy rainfall or snowmelt exceeds the hydraulic capacity of sewage treatment plants. To overcome these disadvantages, some cities built separate sanitary sewers to collect only municipal wastewater and exclude stormwater runoff, which is collected in separate storm drains. The decision to build a combined sewer system or two separate systems is mainly based on the need for sewage treatment and the cost of providing treatment during heavy rain events. Many cities with combined sewer systems built their systems prior to installing sewage treatment plants, and have not subsequently replaced those sewer systems.

== Types ==
=== Conventional gravity sewers ===
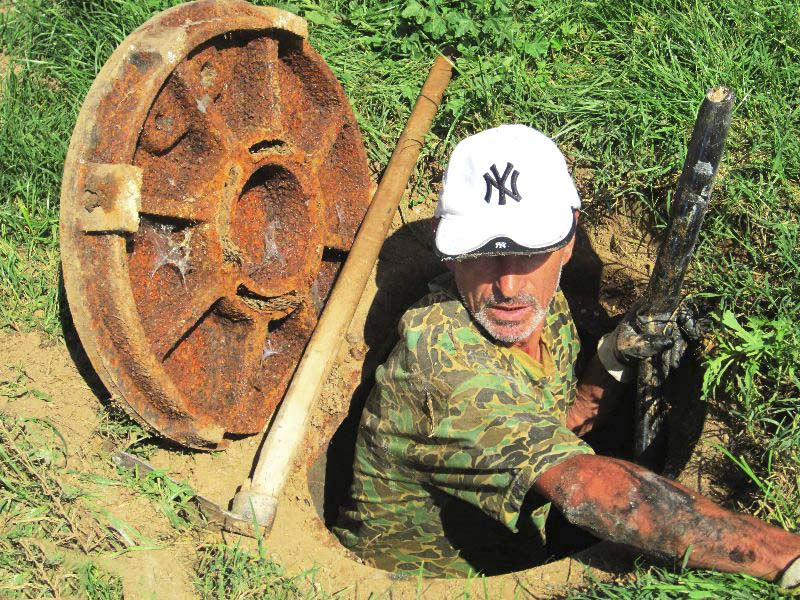
Manhole access to sewer

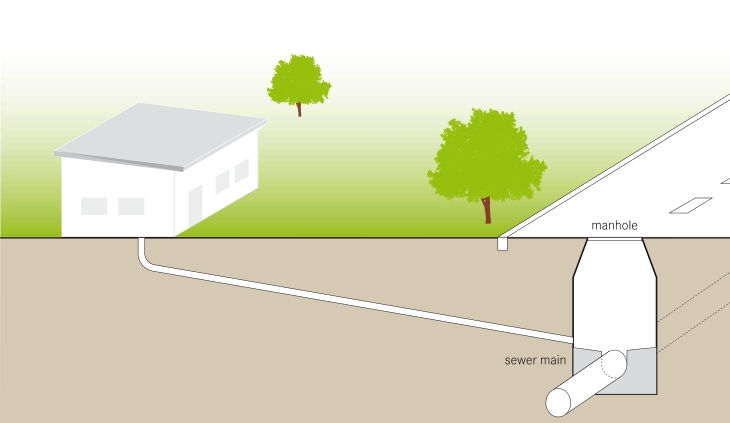
Schematic of a conventional sanitary sewer to convey blackwater and greywater from households to a centralized sewage treatment facility.

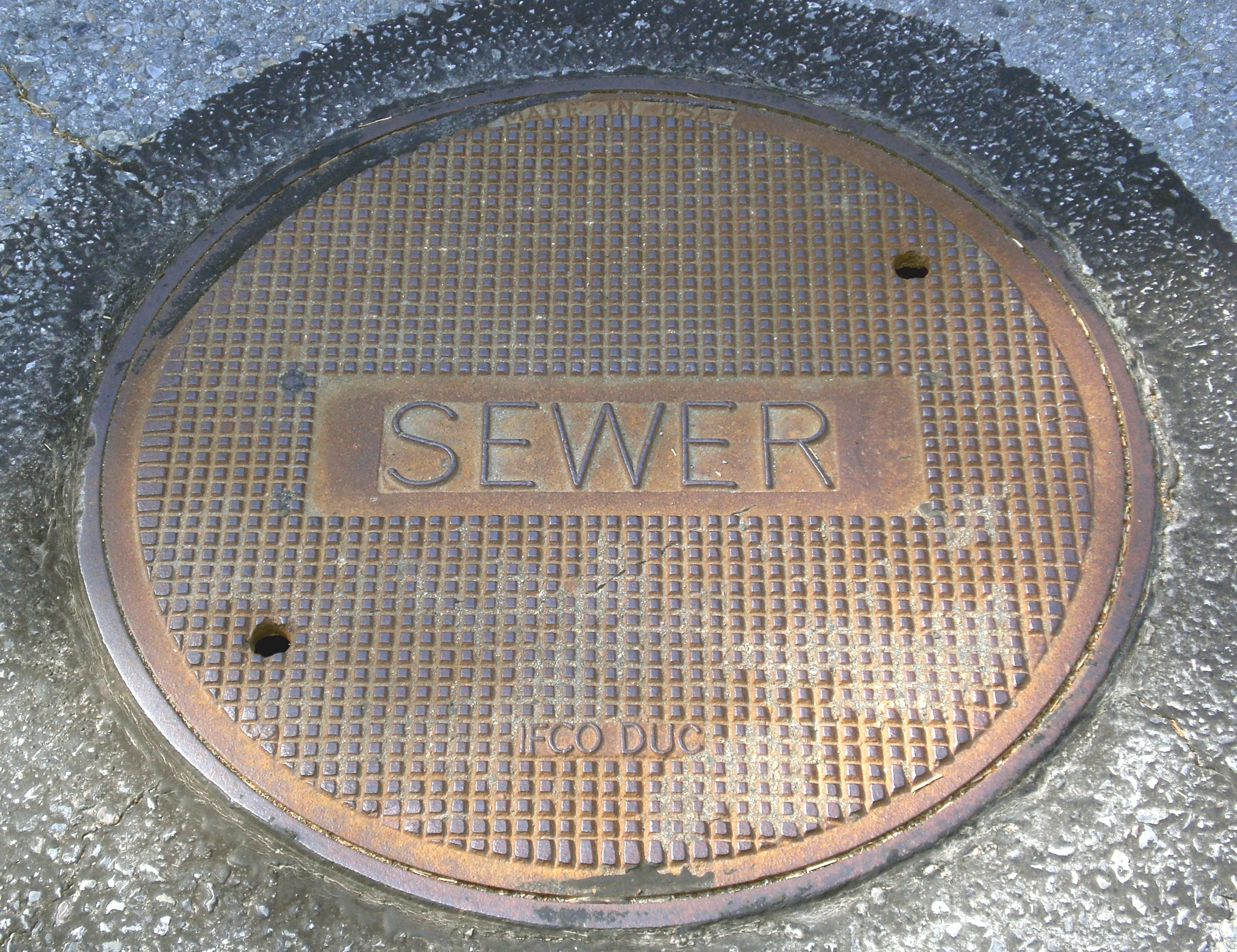
A manhole cover for a sanitary sewer access point.

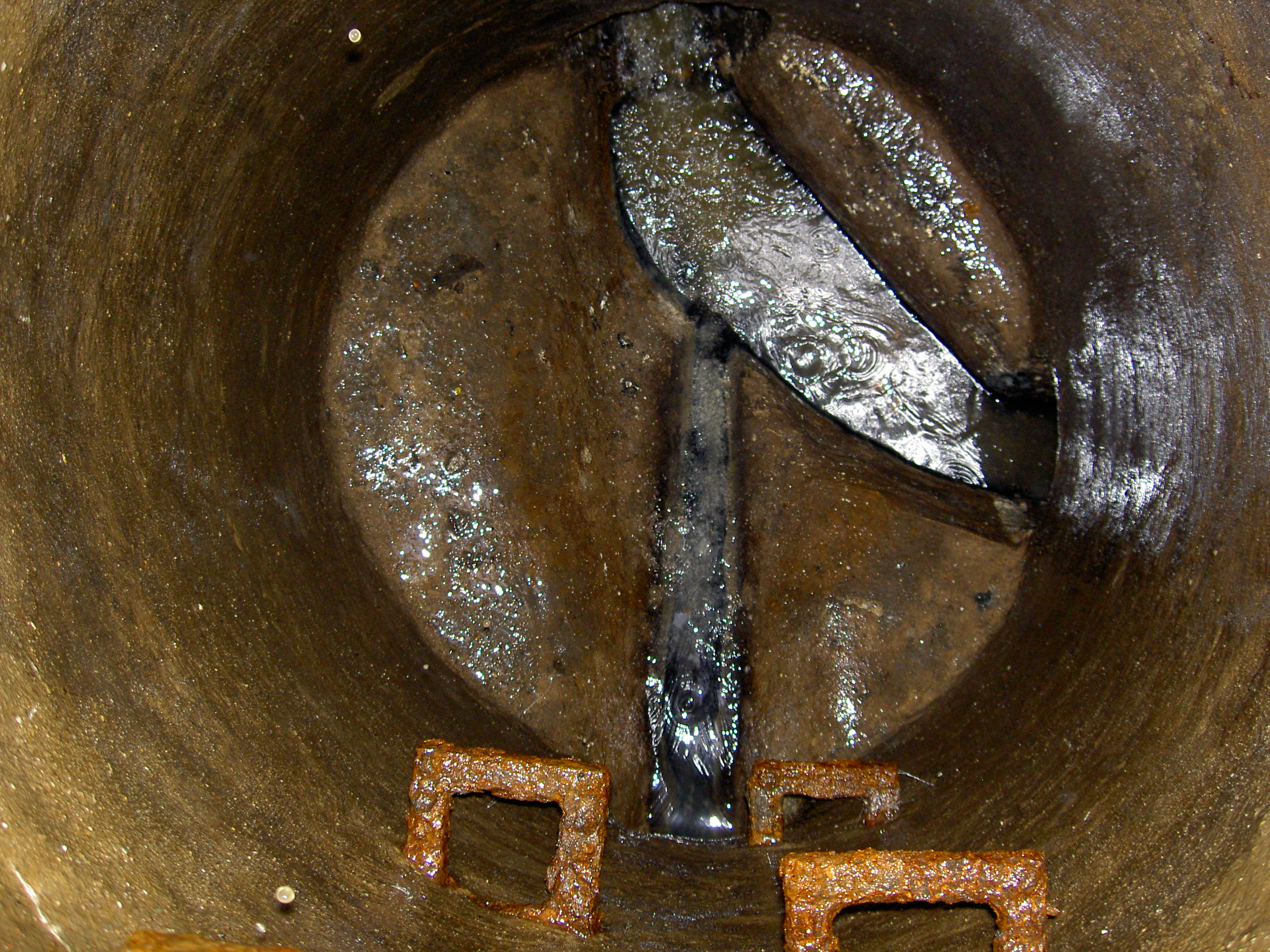
View looking down into an open manhole showing two converging sanitary sewer lines. The larger line enters from the right and changes direction within the manhole to exit from the top of the photo. A smaller line enters from the bottom of the photo under the access steps. The concrete floor of the manhole has channels to minimize accumulation of solids.

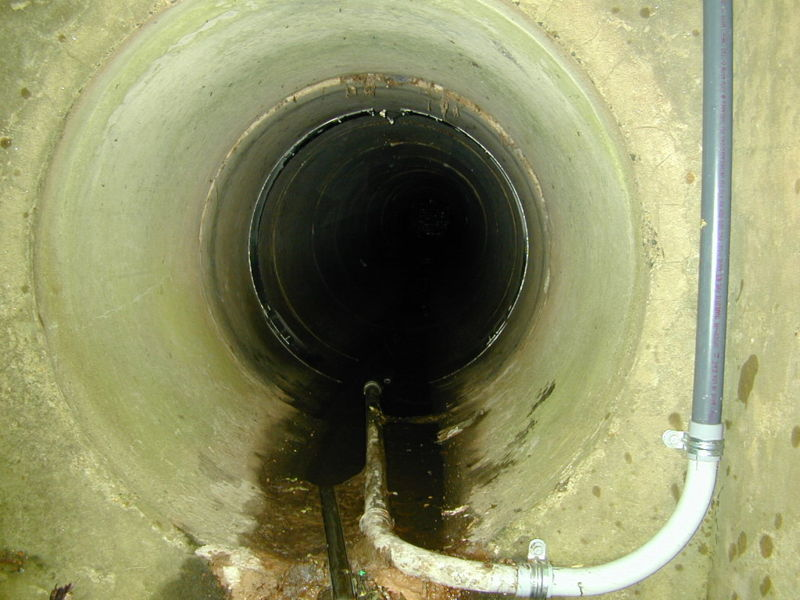
Interior of a large sanitary sewer viewed from an access manhole chamber.

In the developed world, sewers are pipes from buildings to one or more levels of larger underground trunk mains, which transport the sewage to sewage treatment facilities. Vertical pipes, usually made of precast concrete, called manholes, connect the mains to the surface. Depending upon site application and use, these vertical pipes can be cylindrical, eccentric, or concentric. The manholes are used for access to the sewer pipes for inspection and maintenance, and as a means to vent sewer gases. They also facilitate vertical and horizontal angles in otherwise straight pipelines.

Pipes conveying sewage from an individual building to a common gravity sewer line are called laterals. Branch sewers typically run under streets receiving laterals from buildings along that street and discharge by gravity into trunk sewers at manholes. Larger cities may have sewers called interceptors, receiving flow from multiple trunk sewers.

Design and sizing of sanitary sewers considers the population to be served over the anticipated life of the sewer, per capita wastewater production, and flow peaking from timing of daily routines. Minimum sewer diameters are often specified to prevent blockage by solid materials flushed down toilets; gradients may be selected to maintain flow velocities generating sufficient turbulence to minimize solids deposition within the sewer. Commercial and industrial wastewater flows are also considered, but diversion of surface runoff to storm drains eliminates wet weather flow peaks of inefficient combined sewers.

=== Force mains ===
A force main or rising main is a pumped sewer that may be necessary where gravity sewers serve areas at lower elevations than the sewage treatment plant, or distant areas at similar elevations. A lift station is a sewer sump that lifts accumulated sewage to a higher elevation. They may also be used to prime an inverted siphon used to cross underneath rivers or other obstructions. The pump may discharge to another gravity sewer or directly to a treatment plant. Force mains are typically constructed of welded steel or HDPE jointed to resist pressures within the pipe. Force mains are substantially different from pressure sewers which serve individual properties or groups of properties and provide a means of injecting sewage into a local gravity main.

=== Effluent sewer ===
Effluent sewer systems, also called septic tank effluent drainage (STED) or solids-free sewer (SFS) systems, have septic tanks that collect sewage from residences and businesses, and the effluent that comes out of the tank is sent to either a centralized sewage treatment plant or a distributed treatment system for further treatment. Most of the solids are removed by the septic tanks, so the treatment plant can be much smaller than a typical plant. In addition, because of the vast reduction in solid waste, a pumping system, rather than a gravity system, can be used to move the wastewater. The pipes have small diameters, typically 1.5 to 4 inches (4 to 10 cm). Because the waste stream is pressurized, they can be laid just below the ground surface along the land's contour.

=== Pressure sewer ===
Where it is impossible or impractical to discharge sewage from a property into a gravity sanitary sewer, a pressure sewer may provide an alternative means of connection. A macerator pump in a pumping well close to the property ejects sewage through a small-diameter high-pressure pipe into the nearest gravity sewer.

=== Simplified sewer ===
Simplified sanitary sewers consist of small-diameter pipes, typically around 100 millimetres (4 in), often laid at fairly flat gradients (1 in 200). Although the investment cost for simplified sanitary sewers can be about half the cost of conventional sewers, the requirements for operation and maintenance are usually higher. Simplified sewers are most common in Brazil and other developing countries.

=== Vacuum sewer ===
In low-lying communities, wastewater is often conveyed by vacuum sewer. Pipelines range in size from pipes of 125 millimetres (4.9 in) in diameter up to 280 millimetres (11 in) in diameter. Vacuum sewer systems use differential atmospheric pressure to move the liquid to a central vacuum station.

== Piping materials ==
PVC is the dominant material for sanitary plumbing. Its wide use is owed to its chemical resistance and durability. It is however subject to cracking. The chief alternative to PVC is high-density polyethylene (HDPE), which is growing in use. One advantage to HDPE is that the welds are stronger than those used in PVC. Ceramic pipes are also viable owing to their chemical resilience.

== Maintenance ==
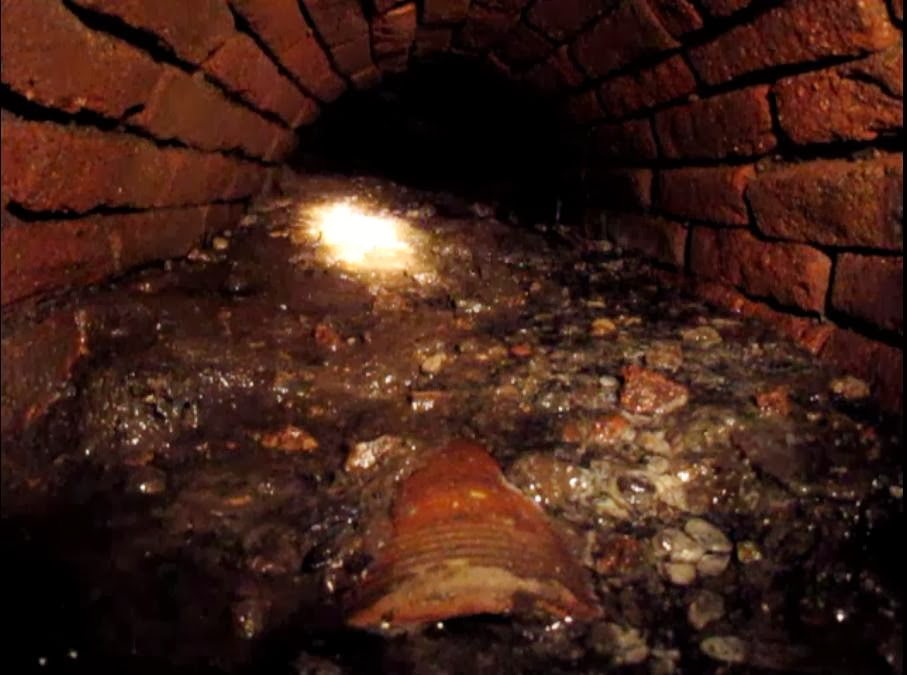
Stoneware sanitary sewer (bottom) submerged in trash and fecalia

Sanitary sewer overflow can occur due to blocked or broken sewer lines, infiltration of excessive stormwater or malfunction of pumps. In these cases untreated sewage is discharged from a sanitary sewer into the environment prior to reaching sewage treatment facilities. To avoid such overflows, maintenance is required. Blockage prevention campaigns or regulations (e.g., requiring the use of grease interceptors by some customers) may also be necessary.

The maintenance requirements vary with the type of sanitary sewer. In general, all sewers deteriorate with age, but infiltration and inflow are problems unique to sanitary sewers, since both combined sewers and storm drains are sized to carry these contributions. Holding infiltration to acceptable levels requires a higher standard of maintenance than necessary for structural integrity considerations of combined sewers. A comprehensive construction inspection program is required to prevent inappropriate connection of cellar, yard, and roof drains to sanitary sewers. The probability of inappropriate connections is higher where combined sewers and sanitary sewers are found in close proximity, because construction personnel may not recognize the difference. Many older cities still use combined sewers while adjacent suburbs were built with separate sanitary sewers.

For decades, when sanitary sewer pipes cracked or experienced other damage, the only option was an expensive excavation, removal and replacement of the damaged pipe, typically requiring street repavement afterwards. In the mid-1950s, a unit was invented where two units at each end with a special cement mixture in between was pulled from one manhole cover to the next, coating the pipe with the cement under high pressure, which then cured rapidly, sealing all cracks and breaks in the pipe. Today, a similar method using epoxy resin is used by some municipalities to re-line aging or damaged pipes, effectively creating a "pipe in a pipe". These methods may be unsuitable for locations where the full diameter of the original pipe is required to carry expected flows, and may be an unwise investment if greater wastewater flows may be anticipated from population growth, increased water use, or new service connections within the expected service life of the repair.

Another popular method for replacing aged or damaged lines is called pipe bursting, where a new pipe, typically PVC or ABS plastic, is drawn through the old pipe behind an "expander head" that breaks apart the old pipe as the new one is drawn through behind it.

These methods are most suitable for trunk sewers, since repair of lines with lateral connections is complicated by making provisions to receive lateral flows without accepting undesirable infiltration from inadequately sealed junctions.

== Ventilation ==
Some sewers have tall vent pipes to release foul gases well up away from people. Common names for these pipes are stink pipe, stink pole, stench pipe and sewer ventilation pipe.

== History ==
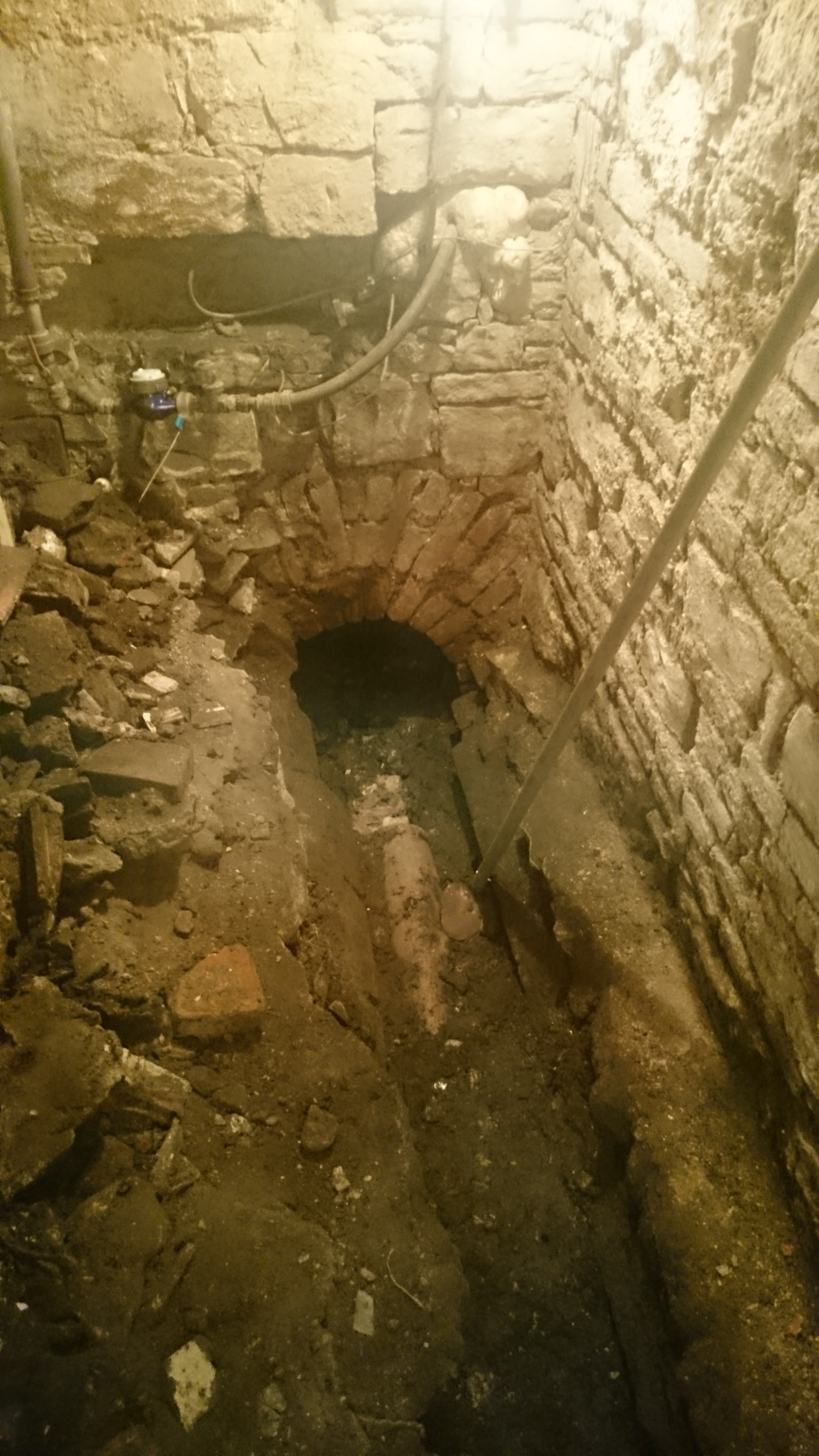
Old brick sanitary sewer from second half of the 19th century. Prague, New Town

Sanitary sewers evolved from combined sewers built where water was plentiful. Animal feces accumulated on city streets while animal-powered transport moved people and goods. Accumulations of animal feces encouraged dumping chamber pots into streets where night soil collection was impractical. Combined sewers were built to use surface runoff to flush waste off streets and move it underground to places distant from populated areas. Sewage treatment became necessary as population expanded, but increased volumes and pumping capacity required for treatment of diluted waste from combined sewers is more expensive than treating undiluted sewage.

Communities that have urbanized in the mid-20th century or later generally have built separate systems for sewage (sanitary sewers) and stormwater, because precipitation causes widely varying flows, reducing sewage treatment plant efficiency.

In the UK, the term "foul sewer" was also in use for a sanitary sewer.

== See also ==
- Media related to Sanitary sewers at Wikimedia Commons (sanitary sewer network)
- Fatberg (sewer obstruction)
- Sewer mining
- Water pollution
