= Sanitary sewer overflow =

Discharge of untreated sewage

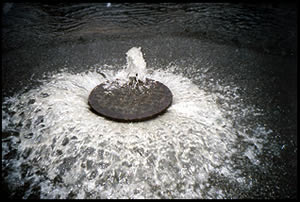
A manhole cover unable to contain a sanitary sewer overflow

Sanitary sewer overflow (SSO) is a condition in which untreated sewage is discharged from a sanitary sewer into the environment prior to reaching sewage treatment facilities. When caused by rainfall it is also known as wet weather overflow. Causes of sanitary sewer overflows include: Blockage of sewer lines, infiltration/Inflow of excessive stormwater into sewer lines during heavy rainfall, malfunction of pumping station lifts or electrical power failure, broken sewer lines, improper sewer design, and vandalism. Prevention of such overflow events involves regular maintenance and timely upgrades of infrastructure.

SSOs can cause gastrointestinal illnesses (waterborne diseases), beach closures and restrictions on fish and shellfish consumption.

== United States (U.S) ==
The U.S. Environmental Protection Agency (EPA) estimates that at least 23,000 to 75,000 SSO events occur in the United States each year. In 2004 EPA estimated that upgrading every municipal treatment and collection system to reduce the frequency of overflow events to no more than once every five years would cost about $88 billion as of 2004. This cost would be in addition to approximately $10 billion already invested. Although the volume of untreated sewage discharged to the environment is less than 0.01 percent of all treated sewage in the United States, the total volume amounts to several billion gallons per annum and accounts for thousands of cases of gastrointestinal illness each year.

== Worldwide perspective ==
Developed European countries and Japan have similar or somewhat larger percentages of SSO events compared to the U.S.

In developing countries, most wastewater is still not treated when discharged into the environment. The People's Republic of China discharged about 55 percent of all sewage without treatment of any type, as of 2001. In a relatively developed Middle Eastern country such as Iran, the majority of Tehran's population has totally untreated sewage injected to the city's groundwater. In Venezuela, a below-average country in South America with respect to wastewater treatment, 97 percent of the country's sewage is discharged untreated into the environment.

In many countries there are obligations to measure and report SSO occurrence using real-time telemetry to warn the public, bathers and shellfishery operators.

== Causes ==
=== Engineering aspects ===
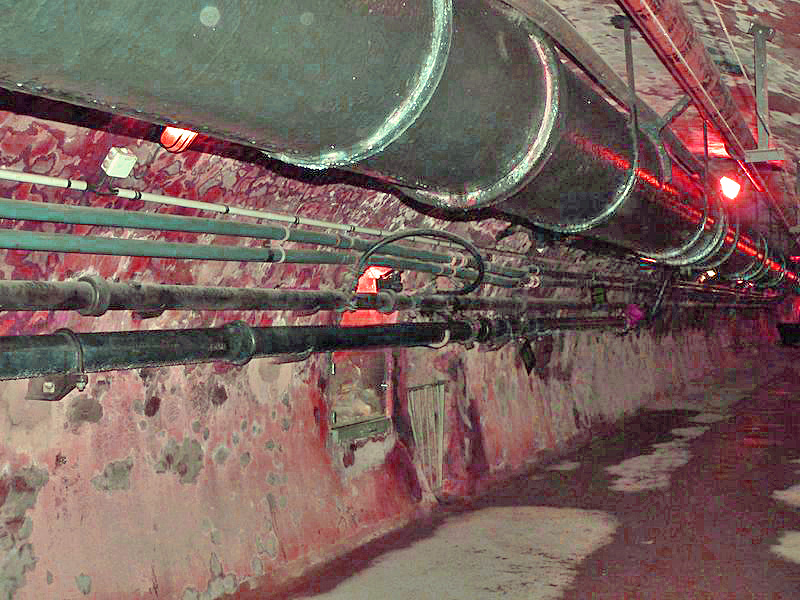
Sanitary sewer line in Paris more than two meters in diameter.

Sewers that were built in the early stages of urbanization were usually built before sewage treatment was implemented. Early sewers were simple drainage systems to remove surface runoff with any waste material it might contain. These drainage systems became combined sewers when sewage from kitchens, baths, and toilets was added; and the discharge became offensive. Early sewage treatment plants were built to treat the sewage during dry weather; but it was infeasible to treat the larger volume of mixed sewage and precipitation runoff from combined sewers during wet weather. Some cities built sanitary sewers to keep sewage from being mixed with surface runoff. In those cities the sewage is efficiently treated during both wet and dry weather. (About 860 communities in the U.S. continue to use combined sewers, as of 2025.)

=== Blockages ===
Decentralized failures in dry weather mainly occur from collection sewer line blockages, which can arise from a debris clog or tree root intrusion into the line itself. Approximately half of SSOs in the United States are caused by blockage. Grease is the blocking agent in approximately half of U.S. SSOs attributed to blockage, and solid debris is the blocking agent for another 25 percent. Roots are a contributing factor in approximately one-quarter of the United States SSOs that are attributed to blockage. Grease deposits are caused by cooking fats liquified with hot water for discharge to sanitary sewers. These fats congeal as solid deposits in the cooler sewer. Solid debris includes soiled clothing, diapers, sanitary napkins flushed down the toilet rather than being put in a waste bin, as well as so-called "flushable wipes" which do not dissolve or break down in water.

Many U.S. municipalities require restaurants and food processing businesses to use grease interceptors and regulate the disposal of fats, oil and grease in the sewer system.

One of the main problems of a decentralized line failure is the difficulty of defining the location of overflow, since a typical urban system contains thousands of miles of collection pipes, and the central treatment plant has no way of communicating with all the lines, unless expensive monitoring equipment has been installed. Companies in the UK have widely deployed bulk dielectric transducers suspended in the sewers to detect high levels and to report the events back over fixed wireless data networks. In certain locations this practice has permitted the reduction of pollution events by up to 60 percent.

Dry weather blockage is less likely within combined sewers, because combined sewers that are designed for the additional volume of surface runoff are much larger than sanitary sewers. Combined sewer storm water regulators (relief structures) may be vulnerable to blockage by debris, but overflow from such blockage typically enters the diversion outfall to avoid flooding private or public property.

=== Infiltration/inflow ===
Approximately one-quarter of United States SSOs occur during heavy rainfall events, which can cause inflow of stormwater into sanitary sewers through damage, improper connections, or flooding buildings and lift stations in low-lying areas of the collection system. The combined flow of sewage and stormwater exceeds the capacity of the sanitary sewer system and sewage is released into homes, businesses and streets. This circumstance is most prevalent in older cities whose subsurface infrastructure is quite old; Paris, London, Stockholm, New York City, Washington, DC, and Oakland, California are typical examples of such locations. Inflow into the sanitary lines can be caused by tree root rupture of subsurface lines or by mechanical fracture due to age and overpressure from trucks and buildings.

=== Malfunctions ===
Another mode of system failure can include power outages, which may disable lift station pumps and cause sewage overflow from the lift station wet well. Lift station mechanical or power failure causes approximately ten percent of United States SSOs. This type of discharge is uncommon from combined sewers, because the combined volume of sewage and storm water discourages use of lift stations. Broken sewer lines are responsible for approximately ten percent of U.S. SSOs.

Power failure, human error, or mechanical failure may cause similar discharge of untreated or partially treated sewage from a sewage treatment plant; but this is typically regarded as a sewage treatment plant malfunction rather than a sanitary sewer overflow. Sewage treatment plants may be designed to capture overflow from malfunctioning units and discharge it to alternative treatment facilities. Flooding of private or public property is typically avoided by discharging the overflow to an outfall designed for discharge of treated sewage.

== Human health and ecological consequences ==
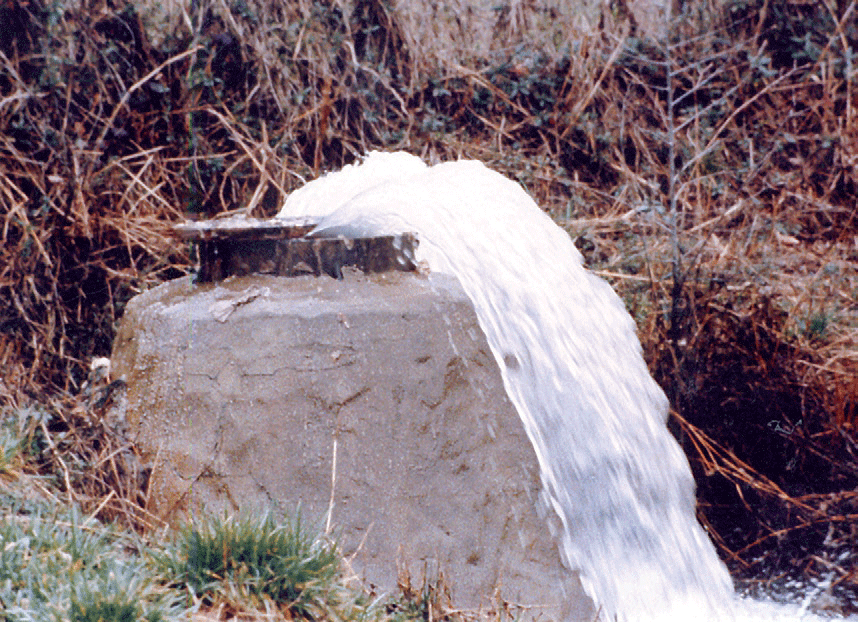
Decentralized wet weather overflow event

Human health impacts include significant numbers of gastrointestinal illness each year, although death from one overflow event is uncommon. Additional human impacts include beach closures, swimming restrictions and prohibition of the consumption of certain aquatic animals (particularly certain molluscs) after overflow events. Ecological consequences include fish kills, harm to plankton and other aquatic microflora and microfauna. Turbidity increase and dissolved oxygen decrease in receiving waters can lead to accentuated effects beyond the obvious pathogenic induced damage to aquatic ecosystems. It is possible that higher life forms such as marine mammals can be affected since certain seals and sea lions are known to experience peaks in pathogenic harm.

== Mitigation techniques ==
The concept of SSO containment valves has been pioneered in the UK and they are installed to mitigate dry spills, by correlating rainfall data with SSO spill activity.

== History ==
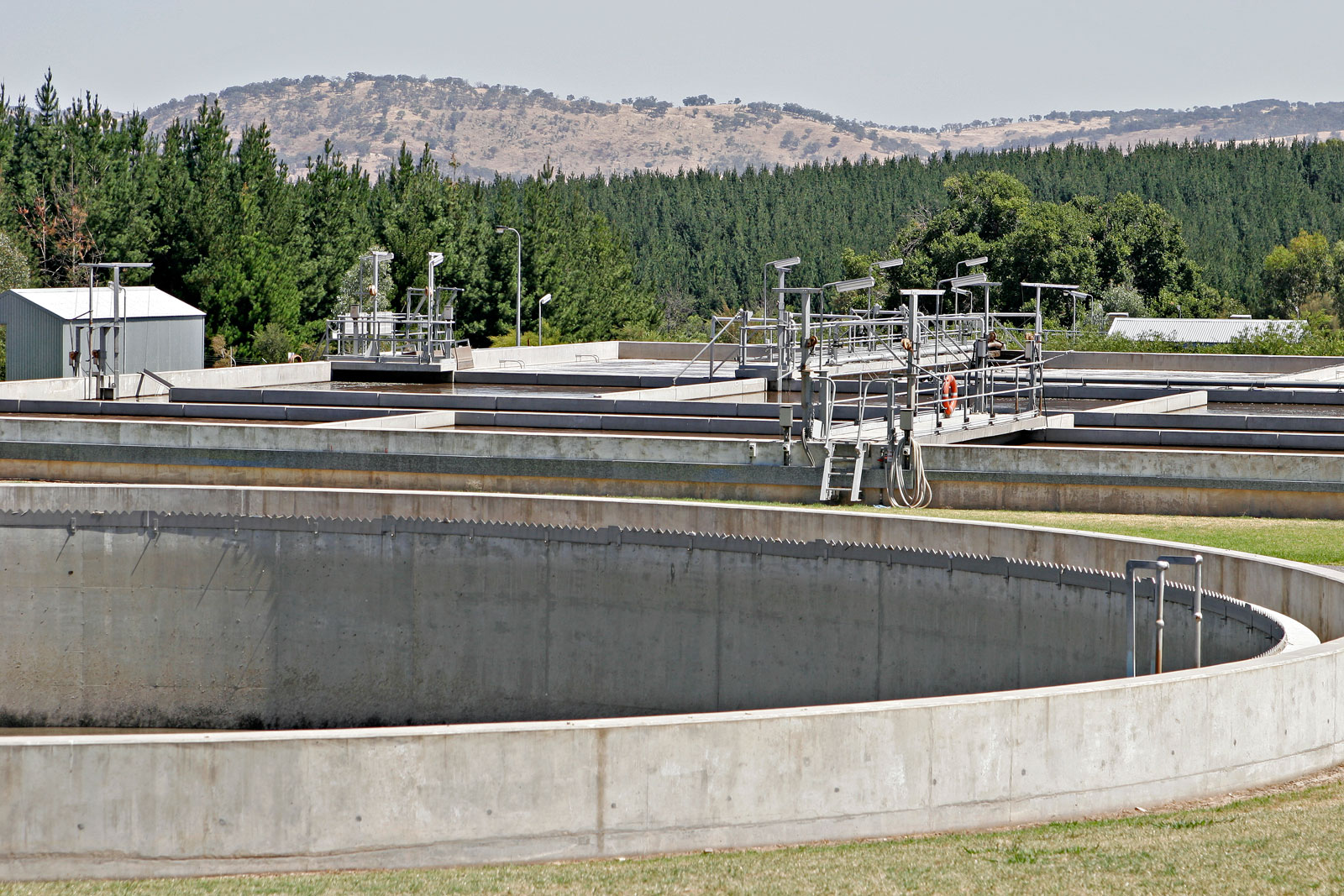
Sewage treatment plant used to create the Wonga Wetlands, Australia

Since medieval times rulers have been aware of the impact of raw sewage improperly discharged to the environment. Before treatment systems existed in 16th century England, King Henry VIII decreed that sewage troughs should be kept flowing so that they would not stagnate in London prior to reaching the River Thames (London sewer system).

In the 19th century, sewage treatment plants were first developed and installed in the U.S. and parts of Europe, and the concept of SSO was identified. SSOs were not recognized as a widespread environmental problem until the rise of environmental awareness in the 1960s. Around that time government agencies in the U.S. began identifying locations and frequencies of SSOs in a systematic way. Local governments heard complaints of citizens, and beach closure protocols were systematised to reduce risks to public health.

After passage of the Clean Water Act in 1972, the U.S. spent billions of dollars on upgrades to sewage treatment plants, with some associated repairs and improvements to the associated collection systems, where the overflows occur. EPA continues to provide funding for low-interest loans to communities for addressing SSO problems, through the Clean Water State Revolving Fund.

In the 1990s Japan, the UK and a number of other European countries began earnest investigation of some of their countries' overflow issues.

== See also ==
- Fatberg (sewer blockage)
- Water pollution
- Overflow relief gully (ORG)
