= Gravity sewer =

Conduit which removes wastewater by use of gravity

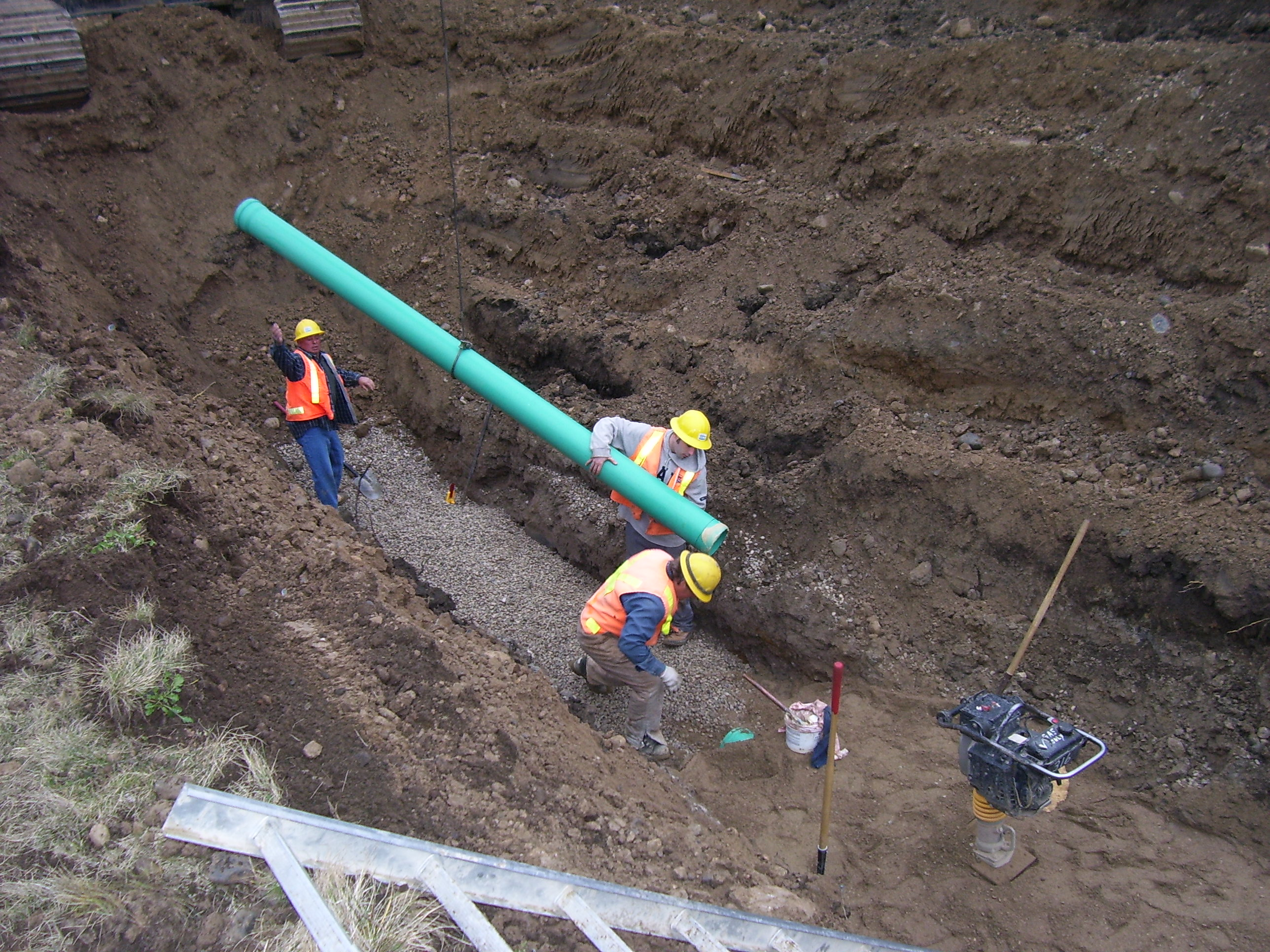
Gravity sewer installation illustrating the significant excavation depth often required to maintain a favorable gradient.

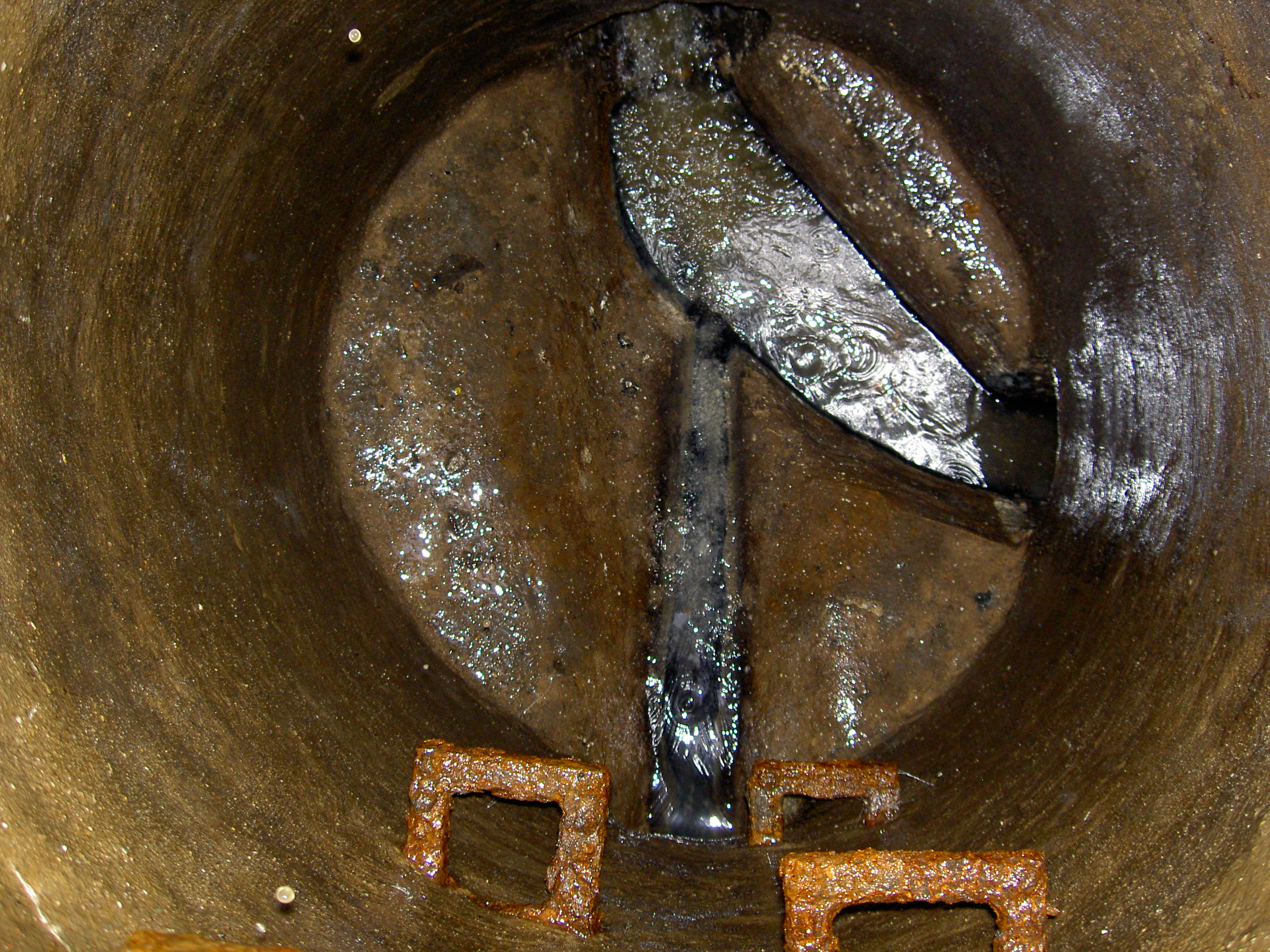
Gravity sewer flow as seen looking down into an open sanitary manhole.

A gravity sewer is a conduit utilizing the energy resulting from a difference in elevation to remove unwanted water. The term sewer implies removal of sewage or surface runoff rather than water intended for use; and the term gravity excludes water movement induced through force mains or vacuum sewers. Most sewers are gravity sewers because gravity offers reliable water movement with no energy costs wherever grades are favorable. Gravity sewers may drain to sumps where pumping is required to either force sewage to a distant location or lift sewage to a higher elevation for entry into another gravity sewer, and lift stations are often required to lift sewage into sewage treatment plants. Gravity sewers can be either sanitary sewers, combined sewers, storm sewers or effluent sewers.

== Gravity sewer hydraulics ==
Gravity sewer systems typically resemble the regional runoff pattern with large trunk sewers in each valley receiving flow from smaller lateral sewers extending up hillsides. Sewer systems within comparatively level terrain require careful planning and construction to minimize energy losses in free falls, sharp bends, or turbulent junctions. Every reach of the sewer should routinely experience the minimum velocity necessary to maintain solids in suspension and avoid blockage from solids deposition in low-velocity areas. Sewers in hilly areas, however, may require energy dissipation features to avoid sewer damage from high fluid velocities and the scouring effects of gritty solids in turbulent flow. Covered sewers are buried below the frost line to avoid freezing, and deep enough to receive gravity flow from anticipated wastewater sources. Long gravity sewers may require significant excavation depths or tunneling to maintain acceptable gradients near the sewer outfall.

== Pumping alternatives to gravity ==
Availability of reliable pumps allows lifting accumulations of water into gravity sewers from collection sumps in excavations like mines or building foundations, but the cost of pumping surface runoff discourages use of lift stations in storm drains or combined sewers. The capitalized cost of operation and maintenance of lift stations and emergency power supplies usually justifies considerable first cost for excavation or tunneling to build a gravity sewer. Sewage treatment is most efficient at centralized locations; and pumping is often required to lift sewage from lower elevations to the sewage treatment plant headworks. Structures called regulators allow overflow into gravity outfall sewers when peak flow in combined sewers exceeds pumping capacity. Sanitary sewers are preferred for cost-effective pumping of sewage when treatment is required. Gravity sewers are preferred where grades are favorable, but lift stations often move sewage to sewage treatment plants.

Vacuum sewers have a permanent negative pressure; due to improvements in technology, they have become more comparable to gravity sewers in operation and maintenance costs, and are cheaper to install.

== History ==
The earliest sewers were ditches to remove standing water from muddy locations where dry ground was preferable for human activity. Early sewers served a function similar to modern storm drains (sometimes called storm sewers). Combined sewers evolved from the practice of using flow in early drainage ditches to remove other wastes including draft animal feces. Sewers became offensive as waste concentrations increased in communities with high population density. Culverts were installed to cover the offensive liquids. Prosperous communities used masonry and brickwork to cover early sewers. Terracotta pipes were used for low volume sewers. The portion of a sewer discharging into a natural water feature is called an outfall.

== Improved sewer materials ==
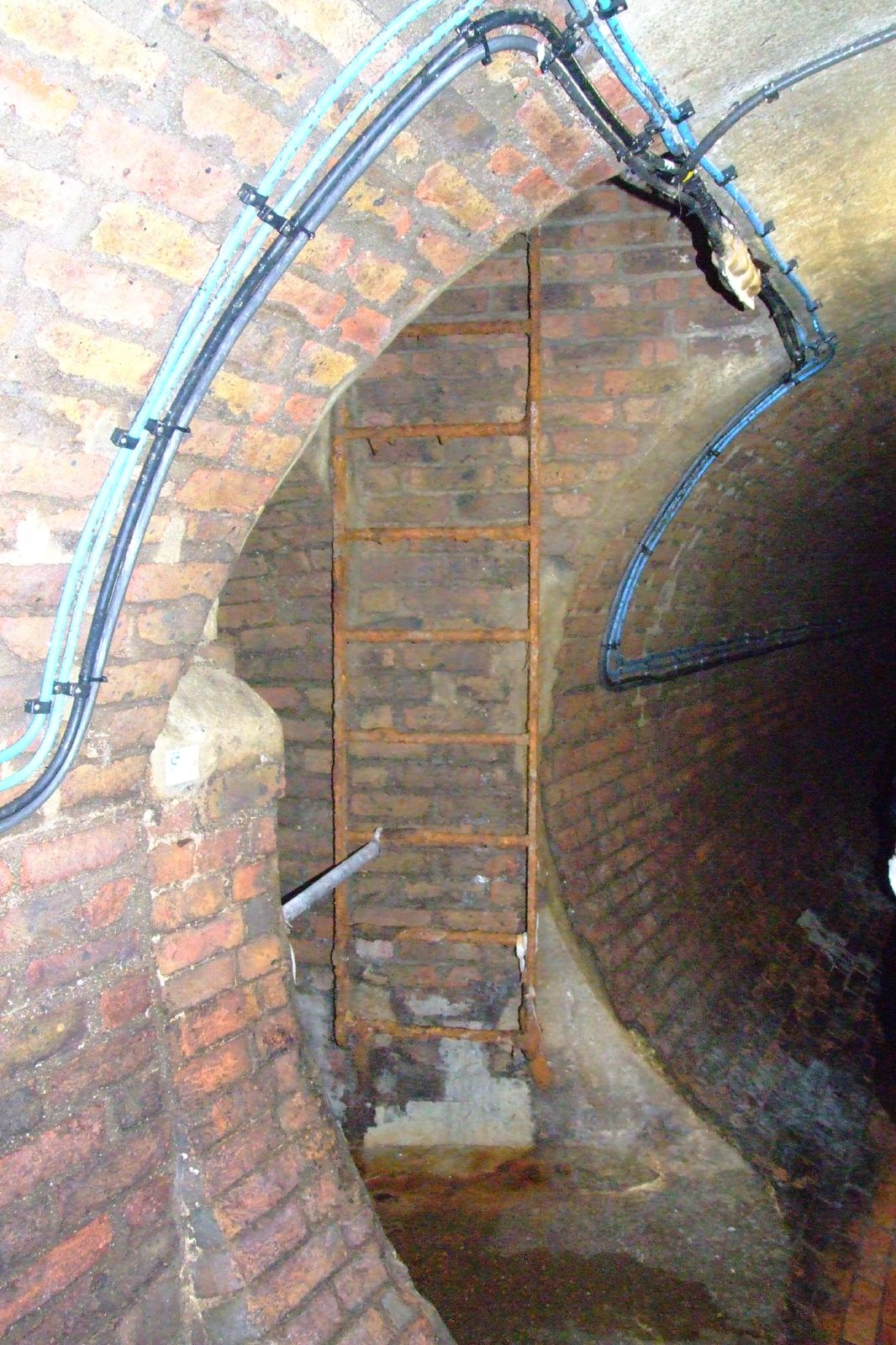
Old brick gravity sewers like this one are typically replaced by reinforced concrete.

The Industrial Revolution increased population density in manufacturing districts, and produced pipes useful for drain-waste-vent systems from buildings to sewers. Gravity sewers have been assembled from cast iron pipe, vitrified clay pipe, precast concrete pipe, asbestos-cement pipe, and plastic pipe. While some older brickwork sewers remain in use, new sewers of diameters exceeding 1 metre (39 in) typically use reinforced concrete. Corrugated metal pipe may be used for storm drains or wastewater with similarly low risk of corrosive conditions. Non-circular cross-sections may have advantages for large-diameter sewers.
