= On-board toilet =

Toilet built inside a vehicle

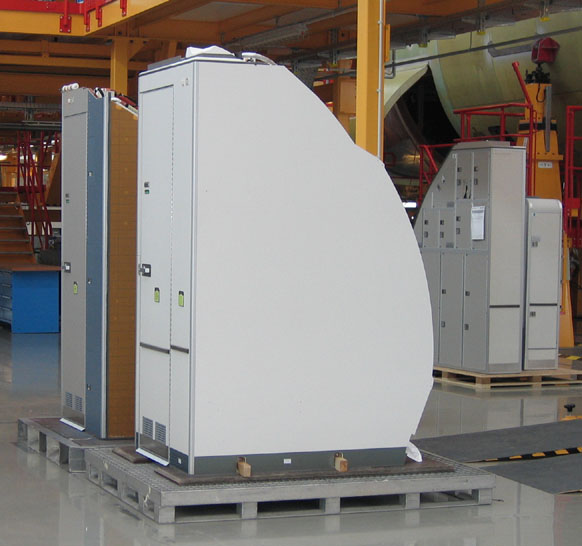
On-board toilet of an aircraft (Airbus)

On-board toilets are enclosures equipped with a toilet for the use of human excretion, typically mounted within a vehicle.

The small rooms also often are equipped with at least a sink, liquid soap and paper towels for hand washing. Except in luxury versions, toilets of this kind are usually small.

The excreta are stored in a holding tank (when chemical toilets or vacuum toilets are used) or, on some ships, piped overboard. They are found in large aircraft, ships including crewed spacecraft, some road vehicles (such as recreational vehicles, coaches) and many passenger train cars.

== See also ==
- Aircraft lavatory
