= Aircraft lavatory =

Small room on an aircraft with a toilet and sink

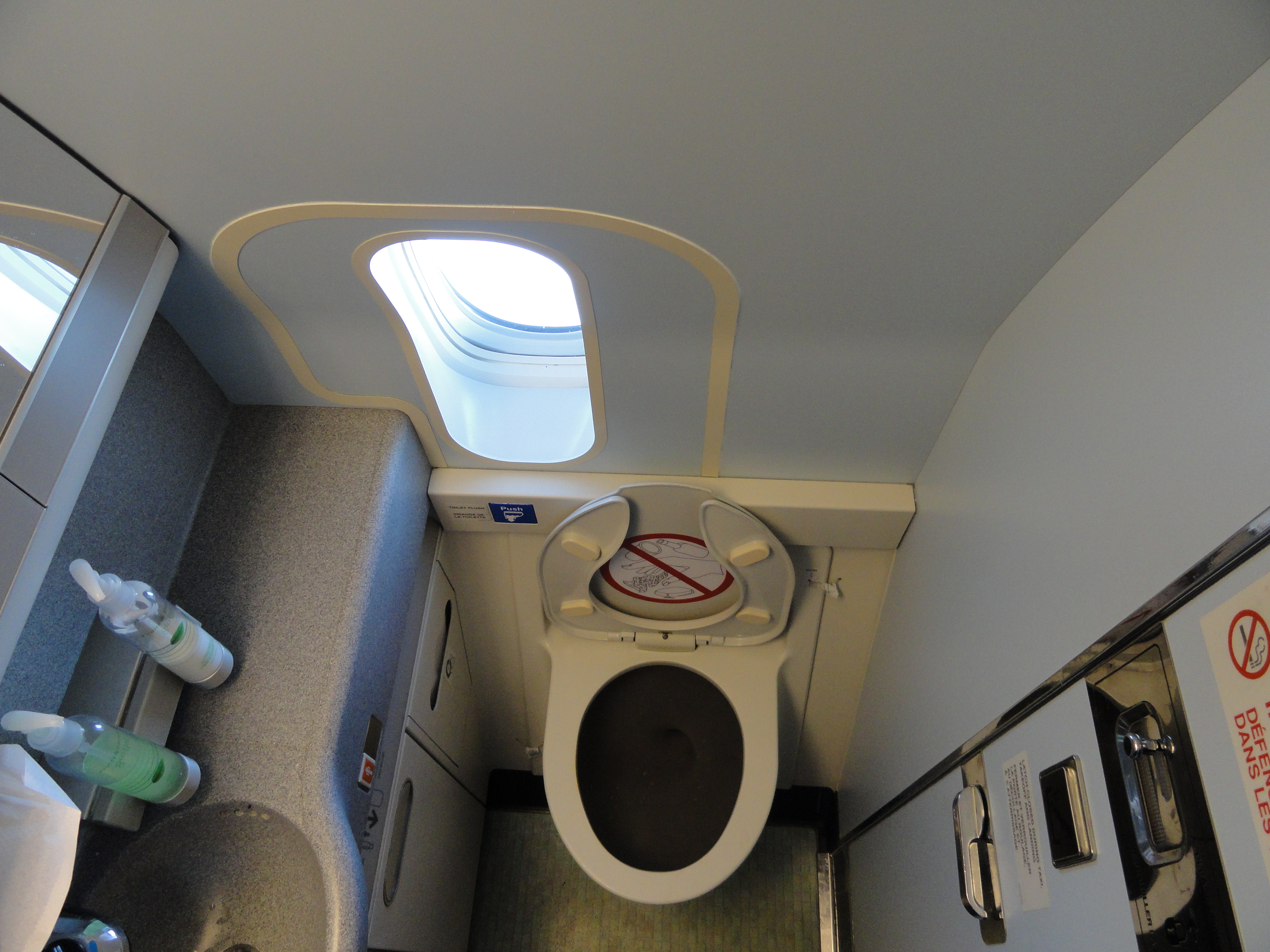
A business class lavatory with a window, on board an Air Canada Boeing 777-200LR (2011)

An aircraft lavatory or plane toilet is a small unisex room on an aircraft with a toilet and sink. They are commonplace on passenger flights except some short-haul flights. Aircraft toilets were historically chemical toilets, but many now use a vacuum flush system instead.

== History ==
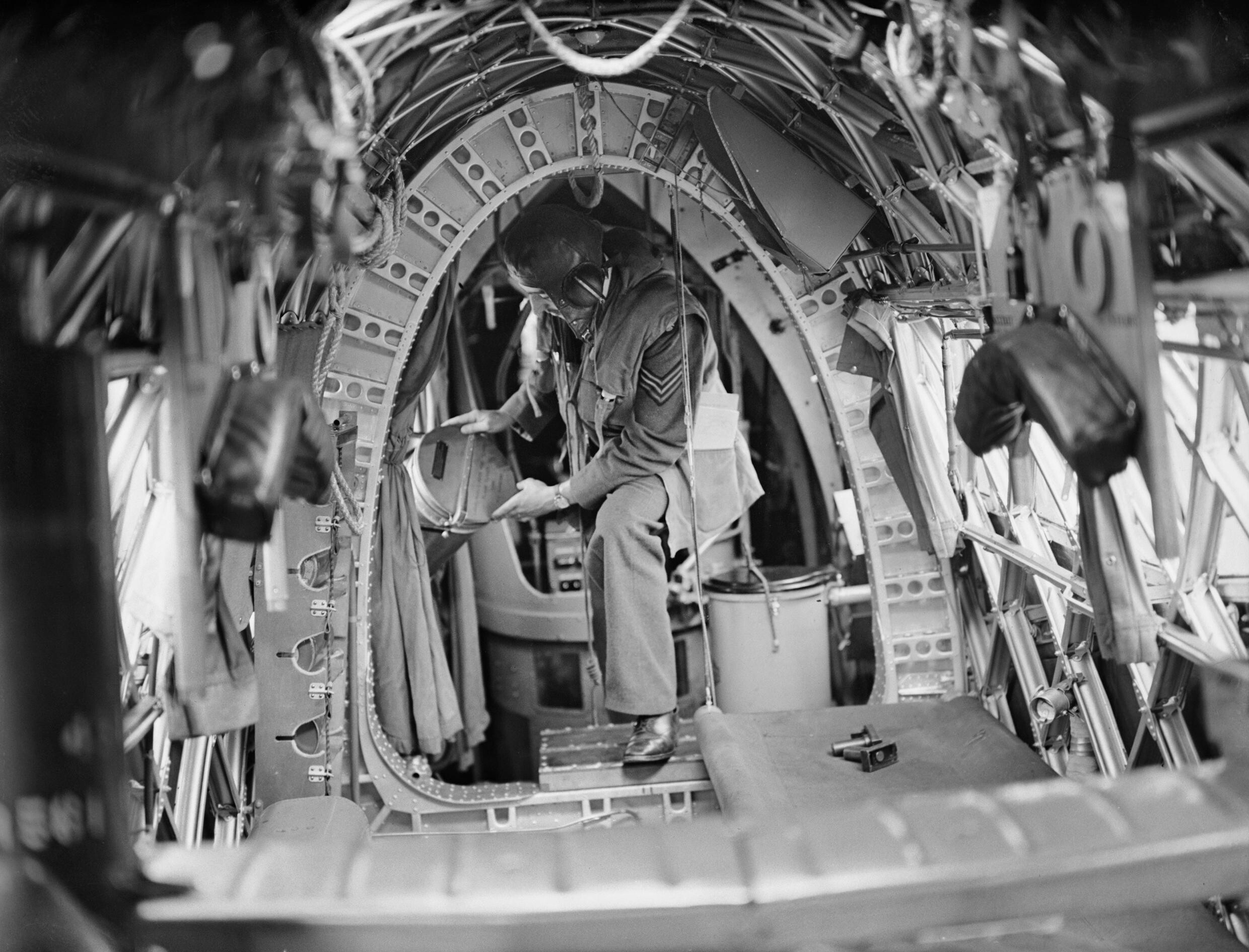
A crewman on board a World War II Royal Air Force Vickers Wellington bomber. The container to his right is the aircraft's "Elsan" chemical toilet (1939–1941).

Early aircraft fitted with a toilet include the 1919 Handley Page Type W, the 1921 DH.29 Doncaster and the 1921 Caproni Ca.60. However, the Caproni crashed on its second flight and never saw service. The Handley Page H.P.42 airliner, designed in 1928, was fitted with toilets near the center of the aircraft. The British Supermarine Stranraer flying boat, which first flew in 1934, was fitted with a toilet that was open to the air. When the lid was lifted in flight, airflow produced a whistling noise that led to the aircraft being nicknamed the "Whistling Shithouse". The Short Sunderland flying boat, which saw military service from 1938 to 1967, was comparatively well equipped, carrying a porcelain flush toilet.

During World War II, large bomber aircraft, such as the American Boeing B-17 Flying Fortress and the British Avro Lancaster, carried chemical toilets (basically a bucket with seat and cover, see bucket toilet); in British use, they were called "Elsans" after the company that manufactured them. These often overflowed and were difficult to use. The intense cold of high altitude required crews to wear many layers of heavy clothing, and the pilot might have to take violent evasive action with little warning causing the bucket to tip over sending waste in all directions. They were unpopular with bomber crews, who would avoid using them if at all possible, especially when an aircraft banked causing the bucket to tip over and empty its contents all over its user. Bomber crew members sometimes preferred to urinate into bottles or defecate into cardboard boxes, which were then thrown from the aircraft. When such containers were unavailable, crew members would urinate out of the bomb bay or defecate into their hands and throw it out one of the waist gun ports.

== Small aircraft ==
During World War II, smaller aircraft such as fighters were fitted with devices known as "relief tubes". These consisted of a funnel attached to a hose that led to the outside and which could be used for urination. These devices were awkward to use and could become frozen and blocked in the intense cold of high altitude.

Such devices are still sometimes fitted to modern military aircraft and small, private aircraft although they are difficult for women to use. Male glider pilots undertaking extended soaring flights may wear an external catheter that either drains into a collection bag or is connected to tubing that dumps the urine to the outside. If the latter approach is used, care must be taken when designing the system so that the stream of urine does not make contact with other parts of the aircraft, where it may eventually cause corrosion.

Another solution to urinating on long military patrols, especially in modern aeronaval patrol craft where a pilot is strapped to their seat, is the use of a sponge-containing zipper storage bag, which is disposed at the end of the flight.

== Passenger aircraft ==
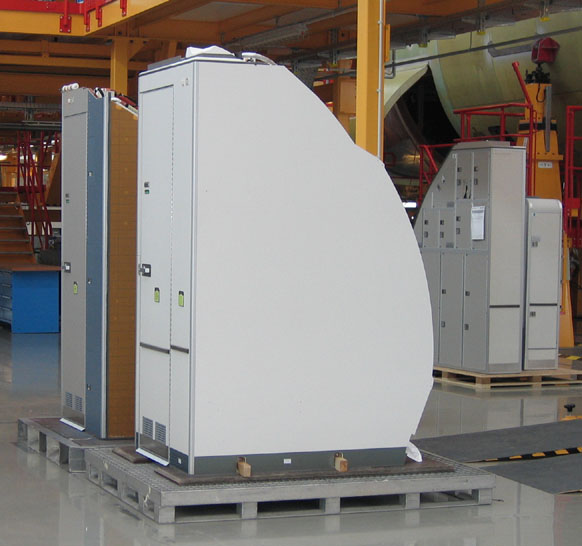
A toilet unit for one of the Airbus A320 family of passenger aircraft, prior to installation (2005)

Lavatories per passenger provided aboard aircraft vary considerably from airline to airline and aircraft to aircraft. On board North American aircraft, including low-cost, charter, and scheduled service airline carriers, the normally accepted minimum ratio of lavatories to passengers is approximately one lavatory for every 50 passengers. However, in premium cabin and business cabins, passengers may have access to multiple lavatories reserved primarily for their use. These ratios of lavatories to passengers vary considerably, depending upon which airline is being used with some first class passengers having one lavatory for every 12 passengers. Additionally, many of the larger long-haul airlines elect to equip their aircraft with larger lavatories for this particular group of passengers willing to pay higher fares.

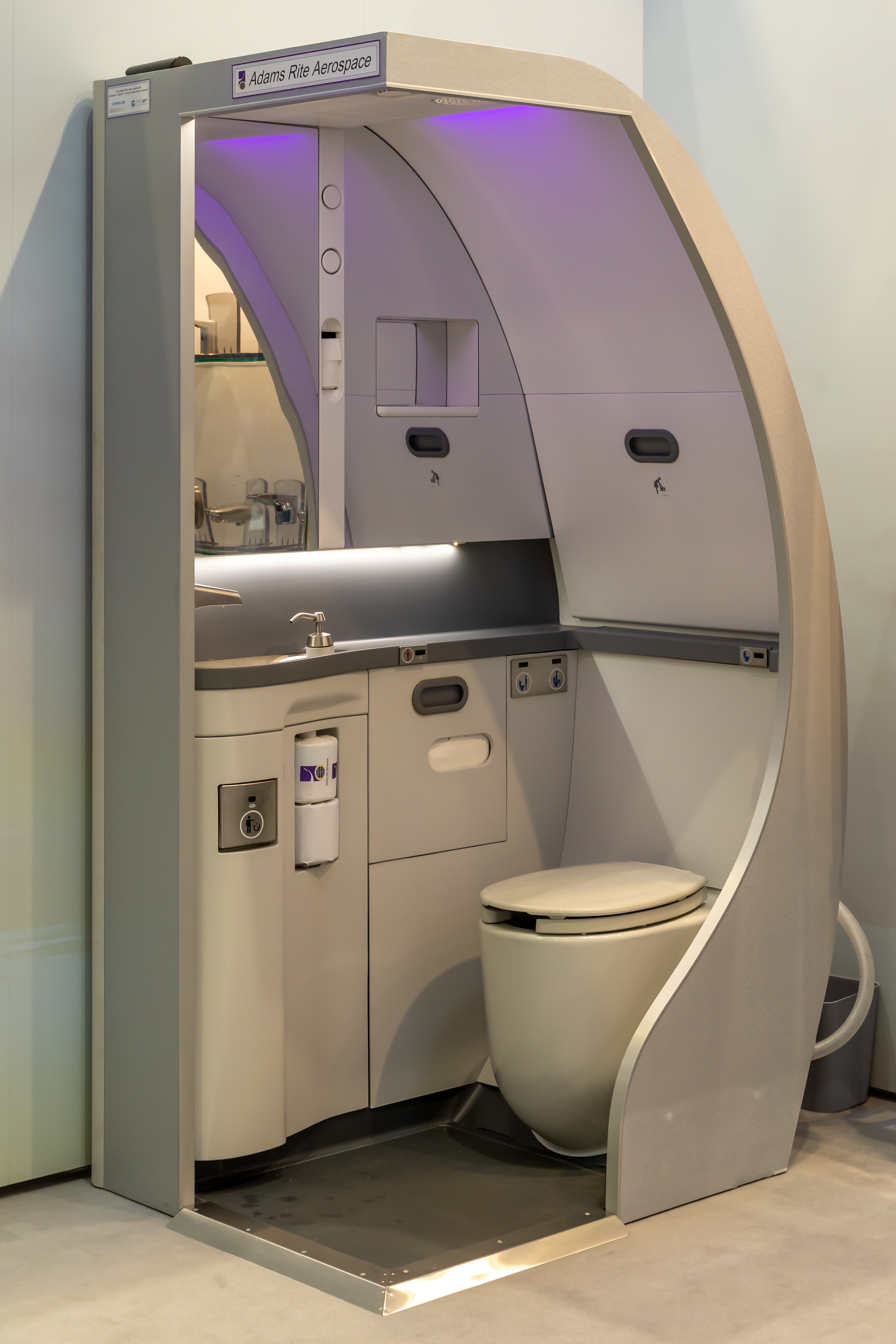
Cutaway model of a lavatory module for passenger aircraft

Smaller commuter aircraft and regional aircraft designed for short-haul flights may not be equipped with lavatories. Recently, many regional airlines in North America have commenced the trend of eliminating the refilling of hand-washing basin potable water tanks in order to reduce weight, fuel consumption, and service costs. To facilitate sanitation, disinfectant hand-wipes are provided.

=== Types ===
Lavatories on modern aircraft are very expensive, and include features that have required substantial upfront and long term investments by the world's airlines to design and develop. Airlines and aircraft manufacturers continually research ways to improve lavatory design technology to increase functionality and reduce costs of production, while maintaining adequate levels of safety, hygiene, and comfort.

For this reason, many modern lavatories are now no longer of the "chemical toilet blue water recirculated electric flush" variety. Instead, lavatory manufacturers have progressed to "vacuum flush" technology to eliminate solid and liquid residue from the basin, patented in 1975.

Some of the advantages of vacuum flush technology systems, from aircraft designers' perspective, are the increased safety attributes through less risk of corrosive waste spill over into recesses around the lavatories which can be difficult to protect. Additionally, vacuum flush systems are considered to be less odor-inducing and substantially lighter in weight, saving fuel by reducing the need to carry large reserves of blue recirculating water.

=== Fixtures ===
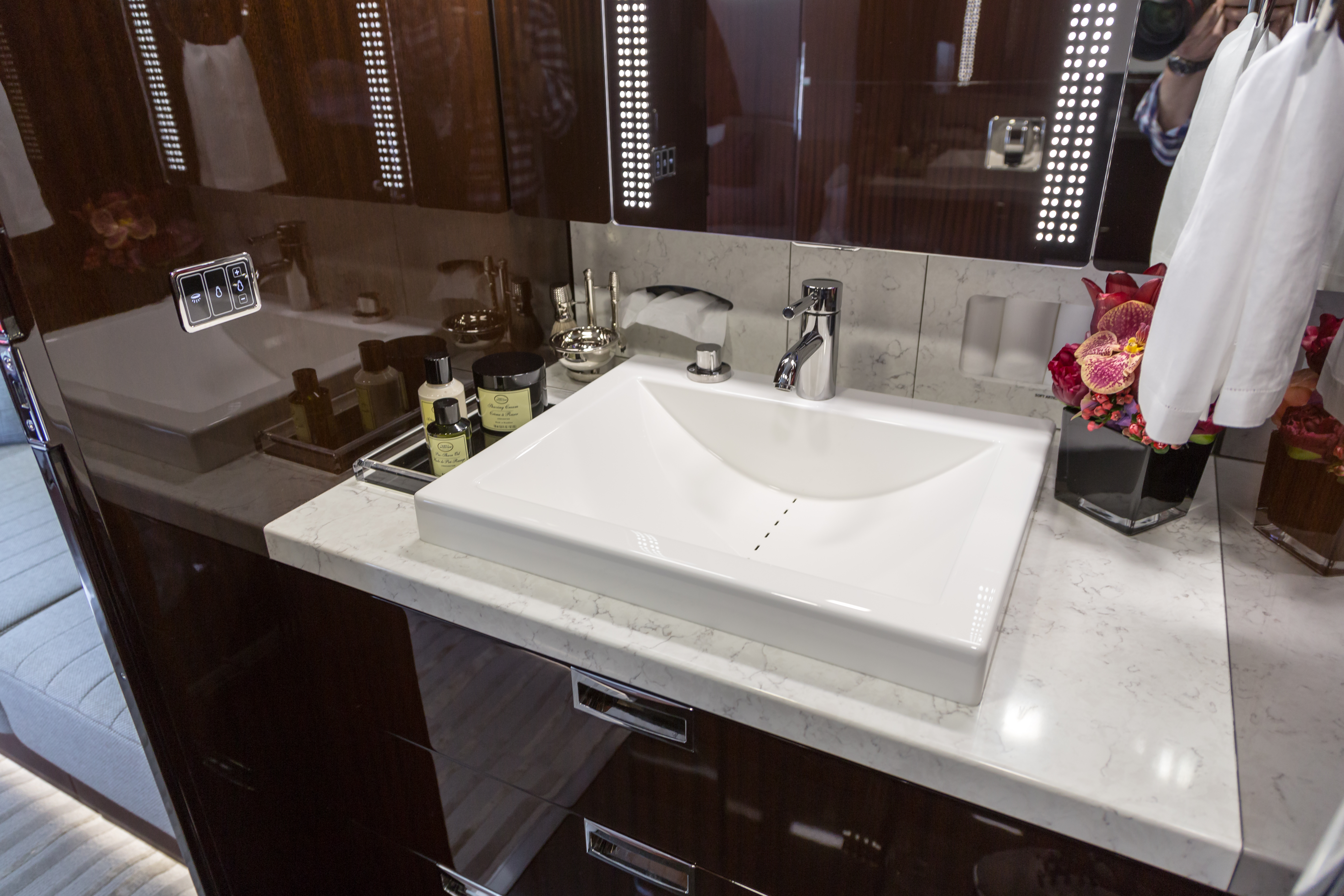
Porcelain lavatory sink in a private jet

- Ashtray (even on airlines that have banned smoking, as a safe place for disposing cigarette butts in case a passenger lights a cigarette)
- Built-in waterless toilet (vacuum flush) with push button flush
- Call button – to signal for assistance
- Electrical outlet for shavers
- Garbage can – small push door to discourage use of toilet to dispose of non-human waste items
- Handle bars to assist elderly or disabled passengers to maintain balance and to get up from toilet
- Handwash faucet and sink (with taps or push button to dispense water)
- Mirror
- Paper towels
- Soap dispenser
- Toilet paper dispenser or linens
- Paper cup dispenser
- Indicator on door that illuminates to indicate lavatory occupied or vacant
- Toiletries – handcream, lotion, facial tissue, sanitary napkins, air sickness bags, etc (Amenities vary by airline and routes)
- Changing table for infants located above the toilet

Fitted cabinets may contain additional toilet paper and other toiletries, but they are often locked or have discreet release mechanisms. A common release mechanism is under the mirror/sink area. A little button is presented which, when pressed, opens the mirror up to show products, such as toilet paper, lavatory soap, feminine hygiene products, and more. The toilet and sink are often moulded plastic or a stainless steel sink; the floor is usually a non-slip surface. In newer aircraft, the executive or first class lavatories are roomier and offer more toiletries and other comforts.

The presence of an ashtray is sometimes commented upon, given that smoking has been long banned on flights in many parts of the world. However it is a requirement of the Federal Aviation Administration that ashtrays continue to be fitted to the doors of aircraft toilets, due to the fire risk caused by the possible disposal of illicitly consumed smoking materials in the toilet's wastebin. In 2011, a Jazz flight from Fredericton, Canada, to Toronto was prevented from taking off because an ashtray was missing – the aircraft instead flew to Halifax without passengers to have a new ashtray fitted.

Waste bins are fitted with halon fire-extinguishing bottles and "oxygen-smothering flapper lids", and the toilets equipped with smoke detectors. Over time these protective devices have been incorporated into aircraft lavatory designs due to fires that have started when the careless smoker of the past or the clandestine smoker of the present has incorrectly disposed of smouldering smoking material. Also, the danger from accidental fires in the toilet is considered to be higher than in other parts of the aircraft cabin as the fire would have more time to develop before being noticed by a passenger or crew-member. Several crashes and/or emergency landings have been linked to fires in or near lavatories, such as Varig Flight 820 and Air Canada Flight 797 in 1973 and 1983, respectively.

If the toilet's fire extinguishing or smoke detection systems are inoperative, the aircraft is still permitted to fly, provided the toilet is barred to passengers and only used by crew members.

=== Servicing ===
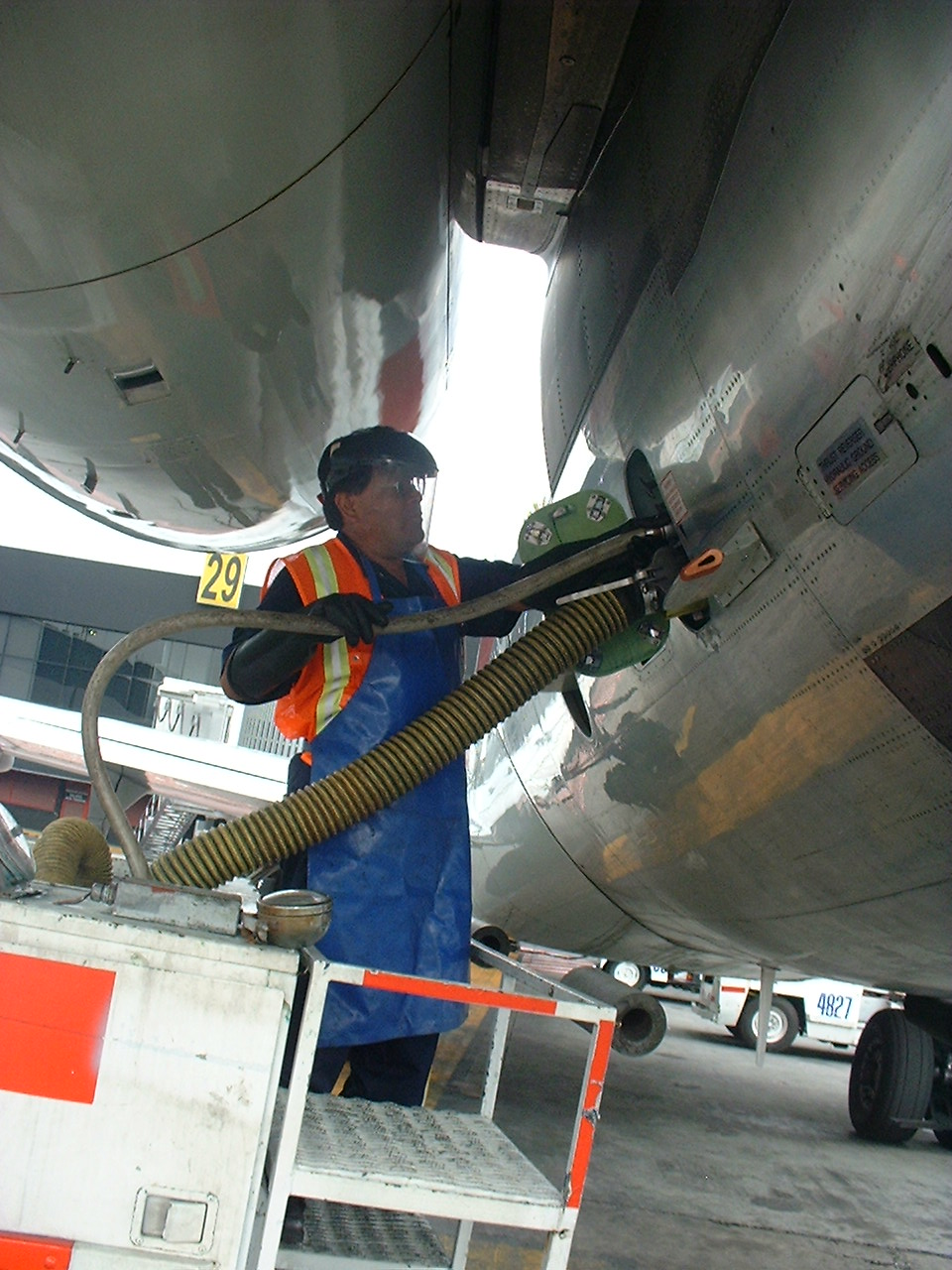
The toilets of a McDonnell Douglas MD-80 being serviced

Each aircraft equipped with a bathroom or lavatory needs to discharge its waste somehow. After an inbound aircraft arrives it is the duty of the "lav agent" to flush the lavatory system. In places where fewer or smaller aircraft are being serviced, a "lav cart" (essentially a small lav truck pulled behind a tug) is used to service the lavatories. At airports with higher volumes of passenger traffic, lavatory agents usually use trucks adapted with large tanks on board that do not need to be emptied as often, often colloquially called honey wagons. These trucks are equipped for access to the waste ports of the aircraft, which can be out of reach by other means.

== Gallery ==
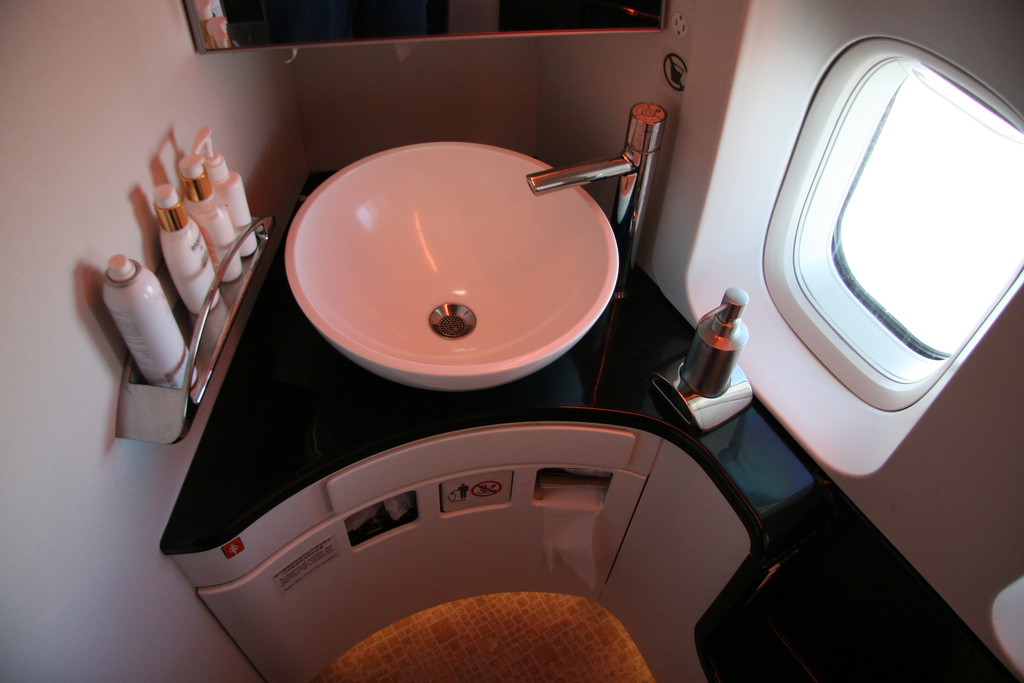
A First Class lavatory

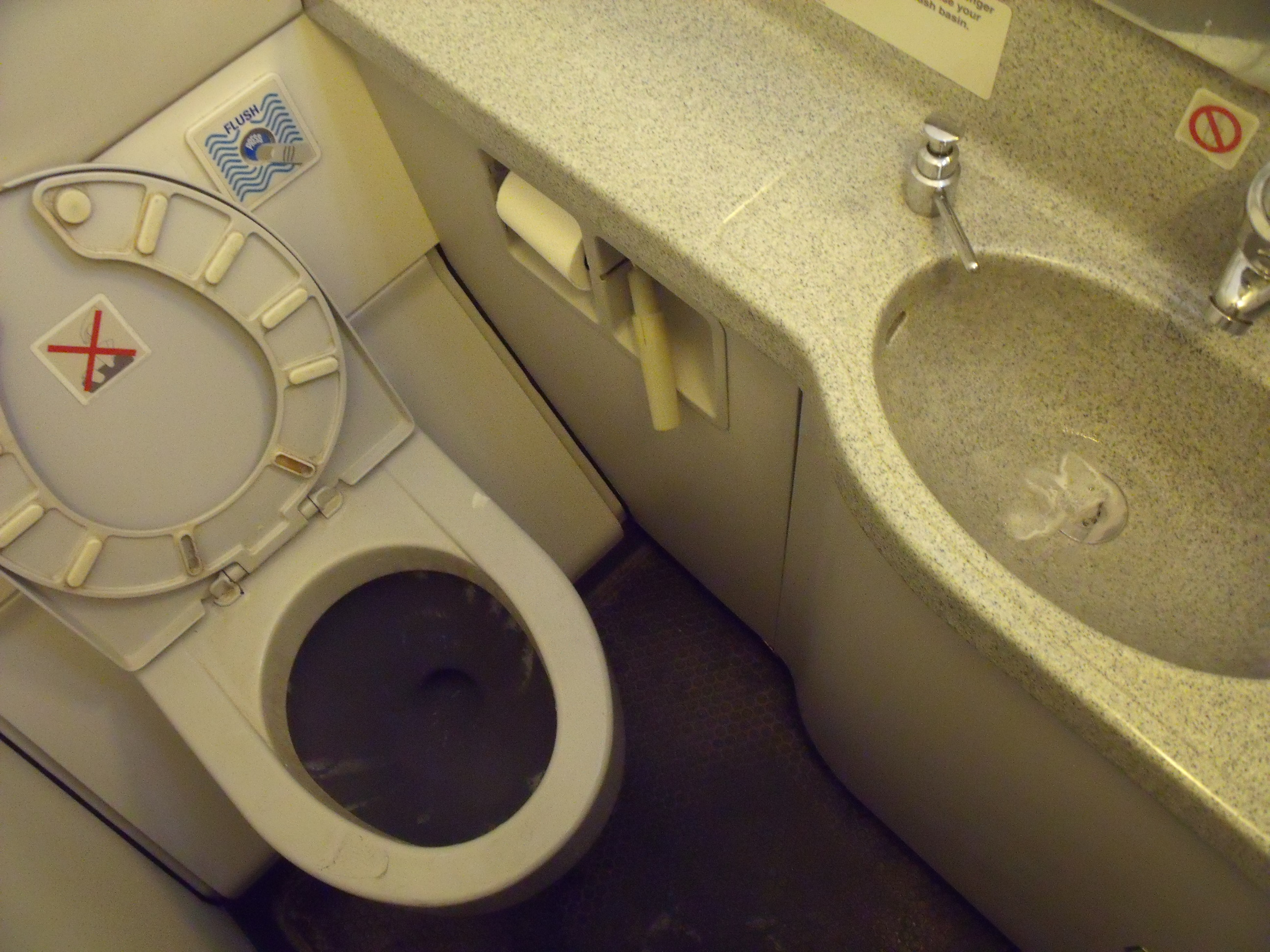
Tiger Airways lavatory

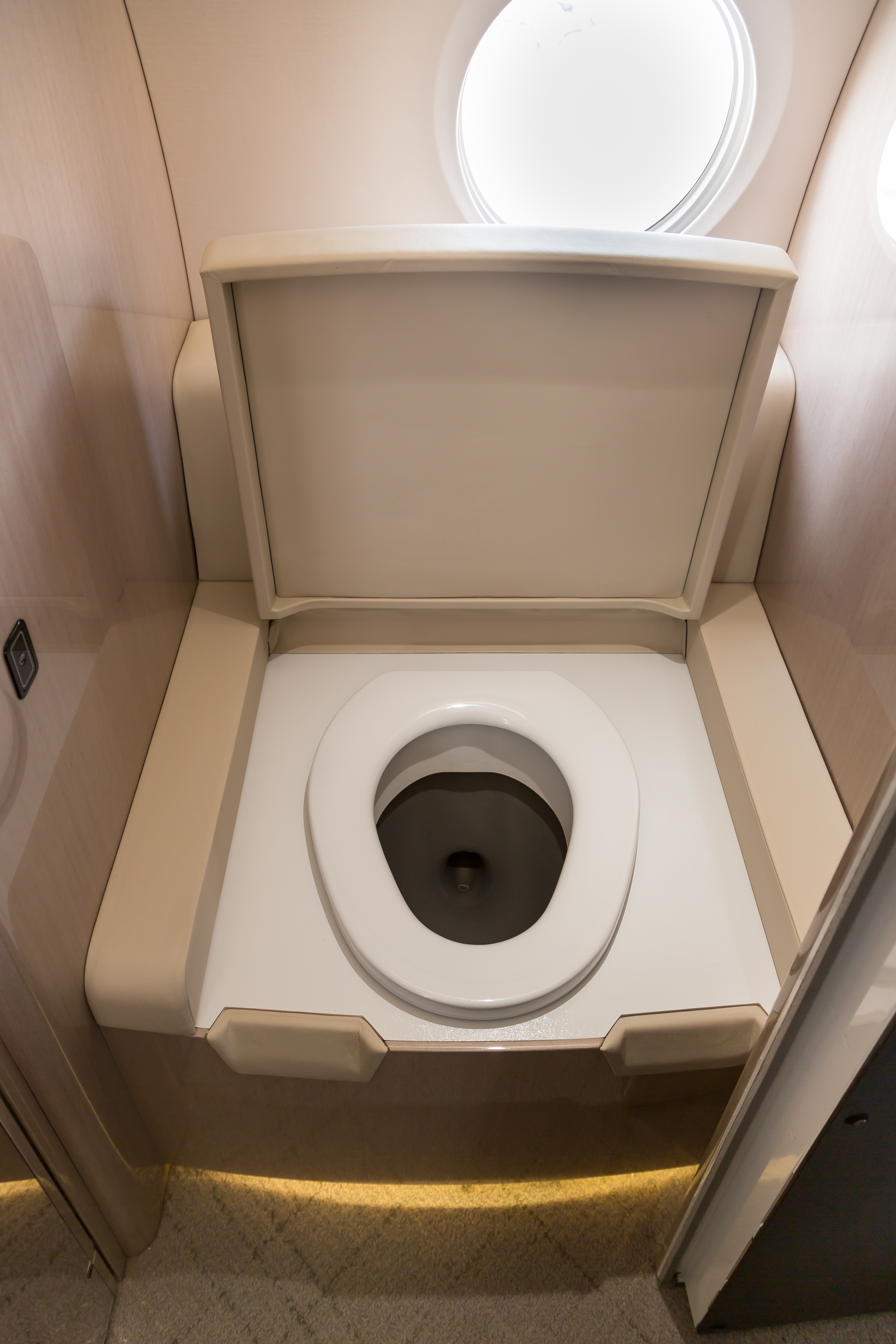
Gulfstream G280 lavatory

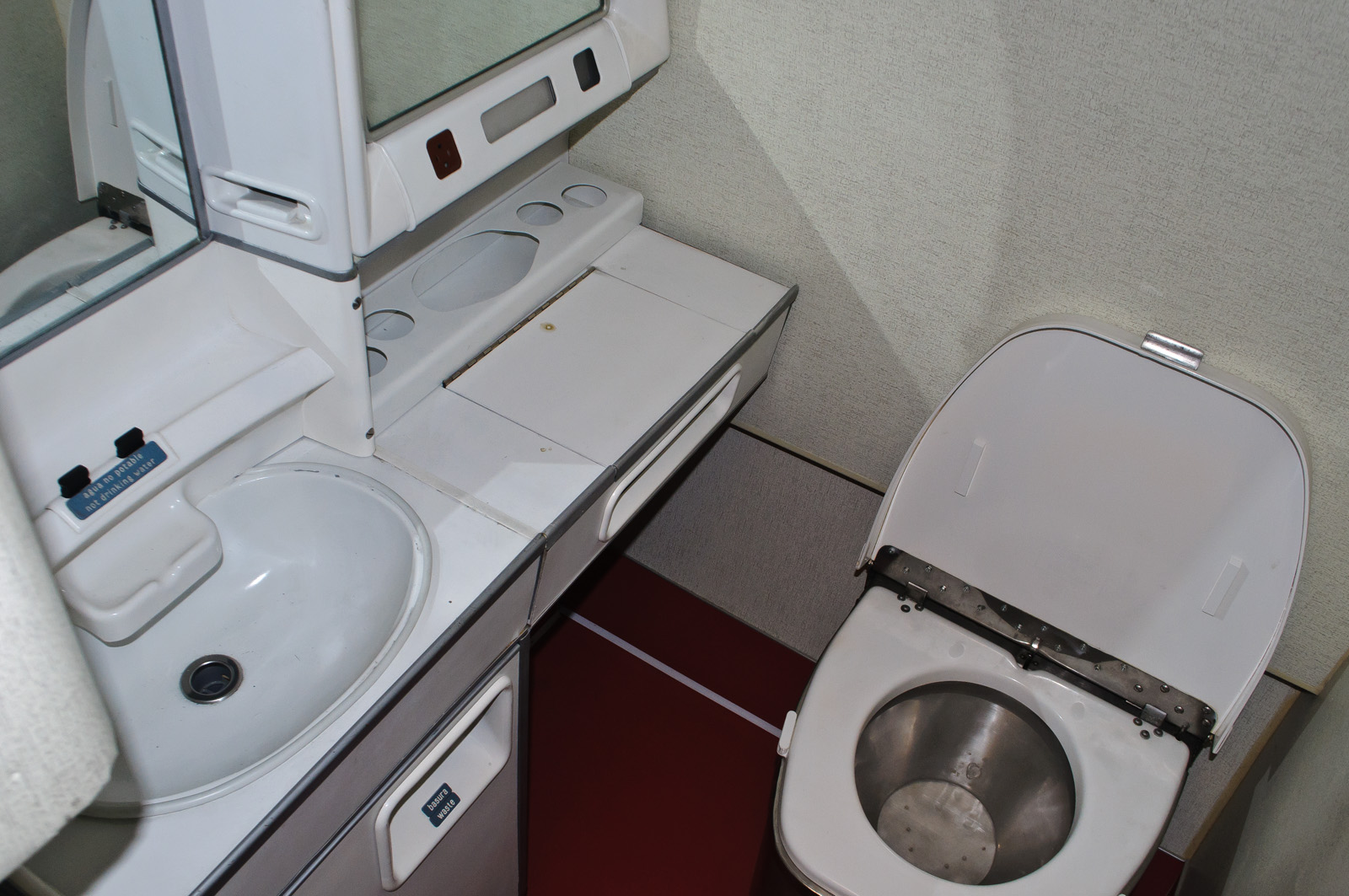
Mexicana de Aviacion Comet 4C lavatory

== See also ==
- Air Canada Flight 797
- Blue ice
- Head (watercraft)
- "Mile high club"
- On-board toilet
- Passenger train toilet
- Space toilet
