= Vacuum sewer =

Method of transporting sewage from its source to a sewage treatment plant

Schematic of a vacuum sewer system

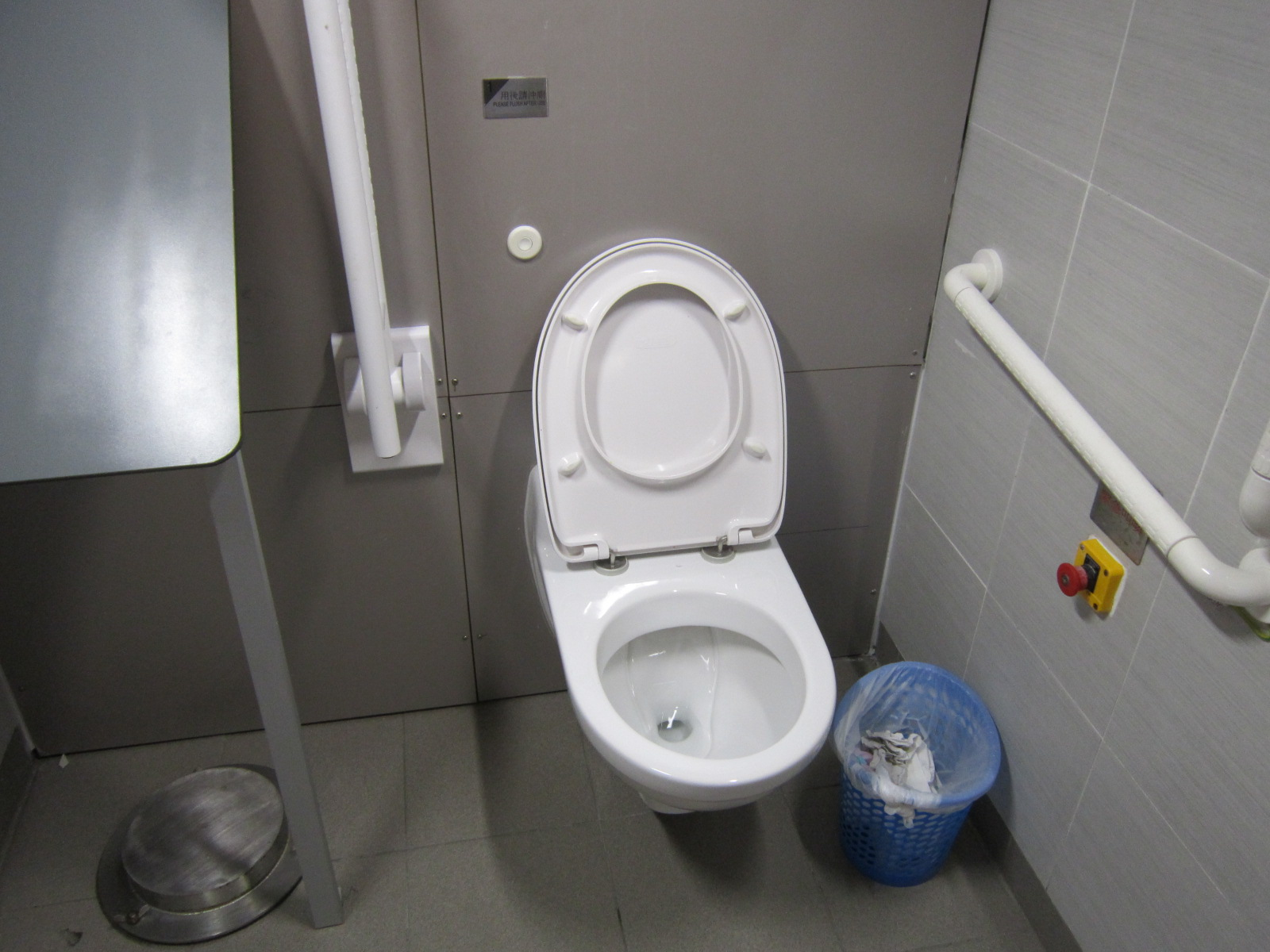
A vacuum toilet at Lau Fau Shan Roundabout in Hong Kong

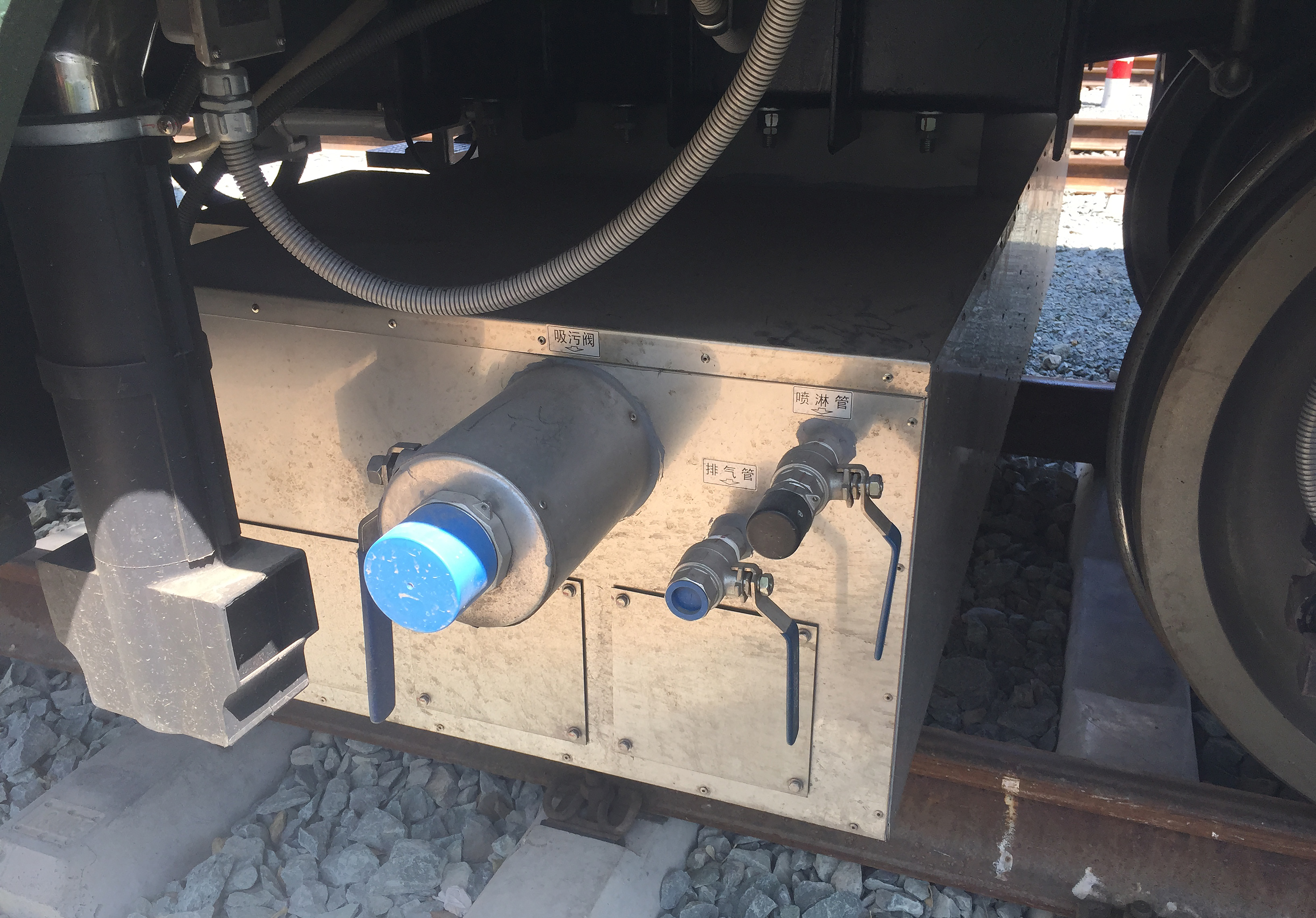
A portable vacuum sewer system on the underside of a train carriage, serving the vacuum toilet and sink inside the train

A vacuum sewer or pneumatic sewer system is a method of transporting sewage from its source to a sewage treatment plant. It maintains a partial vacuum, with an air pressure below atmospheric pressure inside the pipe network and vacuum station collection vessel. Valves open and reseal automatically when the system is used, so differential pressure can be maintained without expending much energy pumping. A single central vacuum station can collect the wastewater of several thousand individual homes, depending on terrain and the local situation.

Vacuum sewers were first installed in Europe in 1882. Dutch engineer Charles Liernur first applied negative pressure drainage to sewers in the second half of the 19th century. Technical implementations of vacuum sewerage systems began in 1959 in Sweden.

Historically, vacuum sewers have been a niche product, used only in trains, airplanes, ferries and flat areas with sandy soils and high ground water tables. Gravity sewers were used for most applications, because although vacuum sewers were cheaper to install, they were more expensive to maintain. In the 20th century, vacuum sewer technology has improved significantly: fault-locating sensors have reduced operation and maintenance costs, and some operators now consider that vacuum sewers can be cheaper to run than conventional gravity sewers.

== Basic elements ==
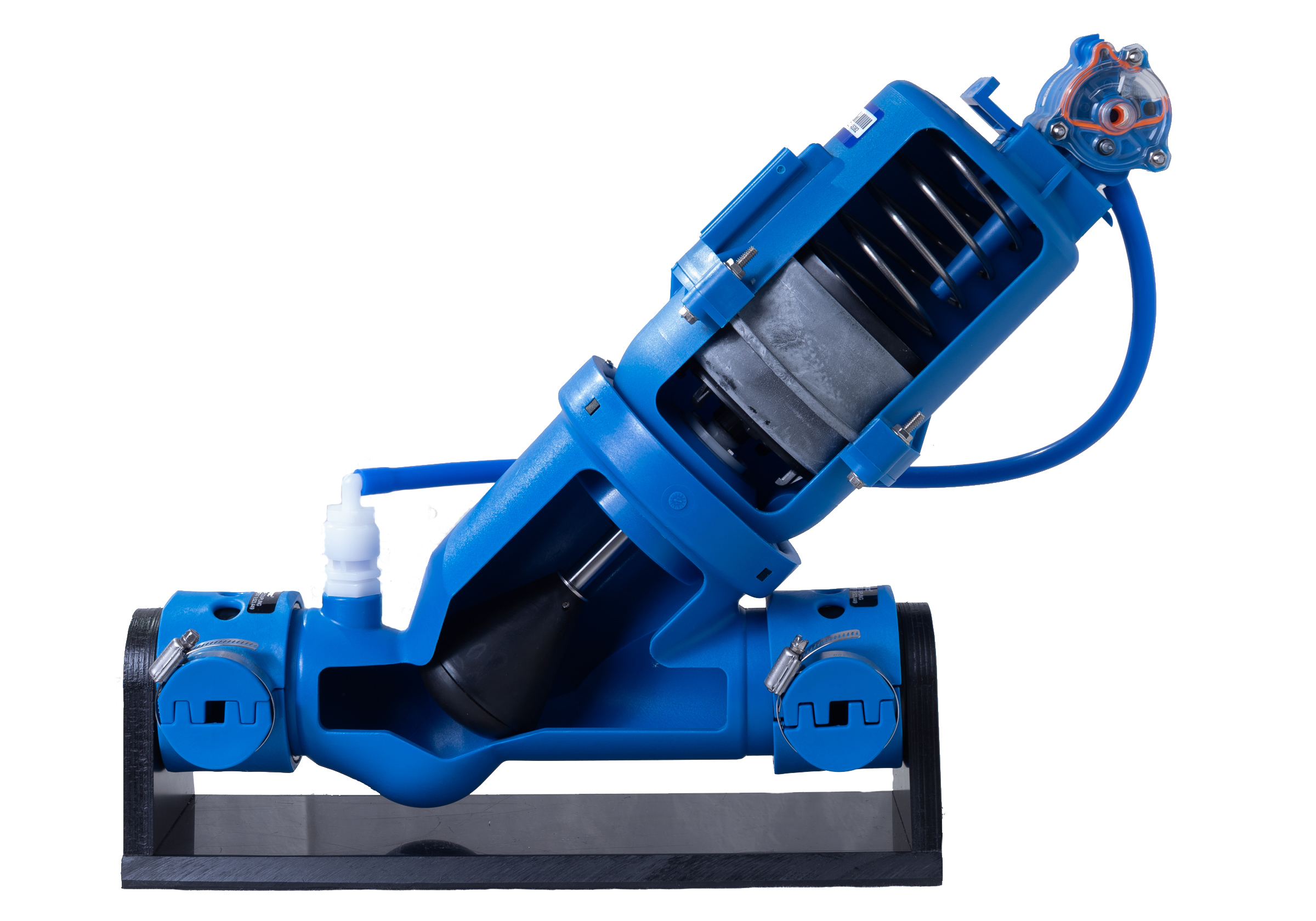
A cutaway of a vacuum valve

A similar vacuum valve opening and closing

The main components of a vacuum sewer system are a collection chambers and vacuum valve parts, sewers, a central vacuum station and monitoring and control components.

Some vacuum systems have vacuum toilets which are connected directly to a vacuum line, which requires less water for flushing (less than a quarter of a liter per flush). Others use standard gravity drainage for the first phase of collection; sewage flows by means of gravity from each house, as in a standard system. It discharges into a collection sump that might collect sewage from 2-6 houses and is located in a public area.

Vacuum technology is based on differential air pressure. Rotary vane vacuum pumps generate an operation pressure of -0.4 to -0.6 bar at the vacuum station, which is also the only element of the vacuum sewerage system that must be supplied with electricity.

Interface valves are installed inside the collection chambers. They work pneumatically. After a certain fill level inside this sump is reached, the interface valve opens. The impulse to open the valve is transferred by a pneumatically mechanical controlled controller unit. No electricity is needed to open or close the valve. The energy is provided by the vacuum itself.

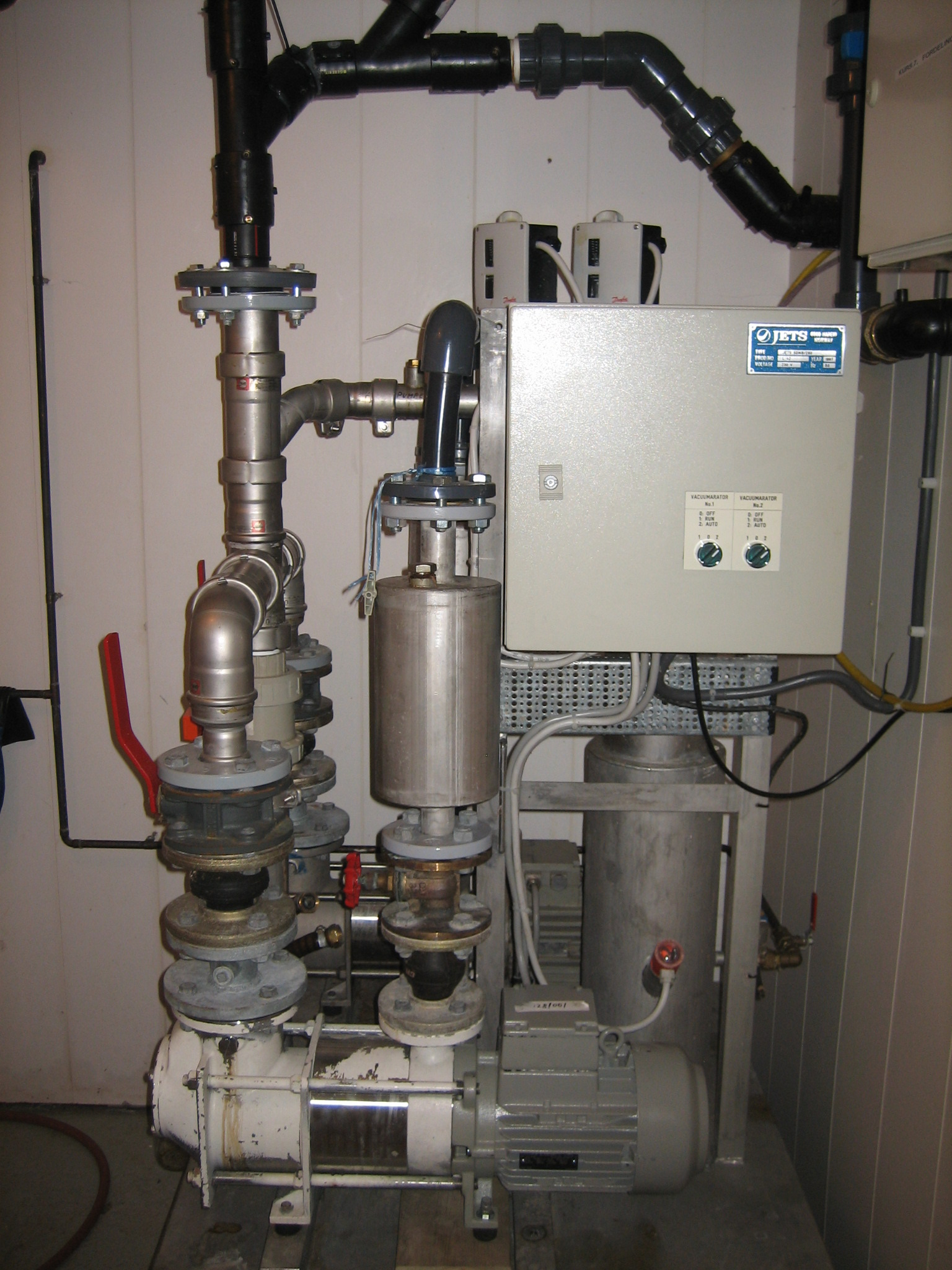
A vacuum station for a student dorm in Norway, providing suction for all the vacuum toilets in the dorm

While the valve is open, the resulting differential pressure between atmosphere and vacuum becomes the driving force and transports the wastewater and air towards the vacuum station. Besides these collection chambers, no other manholes, neither for changes in direction, nor for inspection or connection of branch lines, are necessary. High flow velocities keep the system free of any blockages or sedimentation.

Large systems with numerous collection chambers benefit from the provision of a monitoring system for remote monitoring of the vacuum valves and sump pits. Such systems allow much faster troubleshooting and easier preventive maintenance of collection chambers and valves. However, monitoring systems are optional systems and not required for operation of vacuum sewer systems.

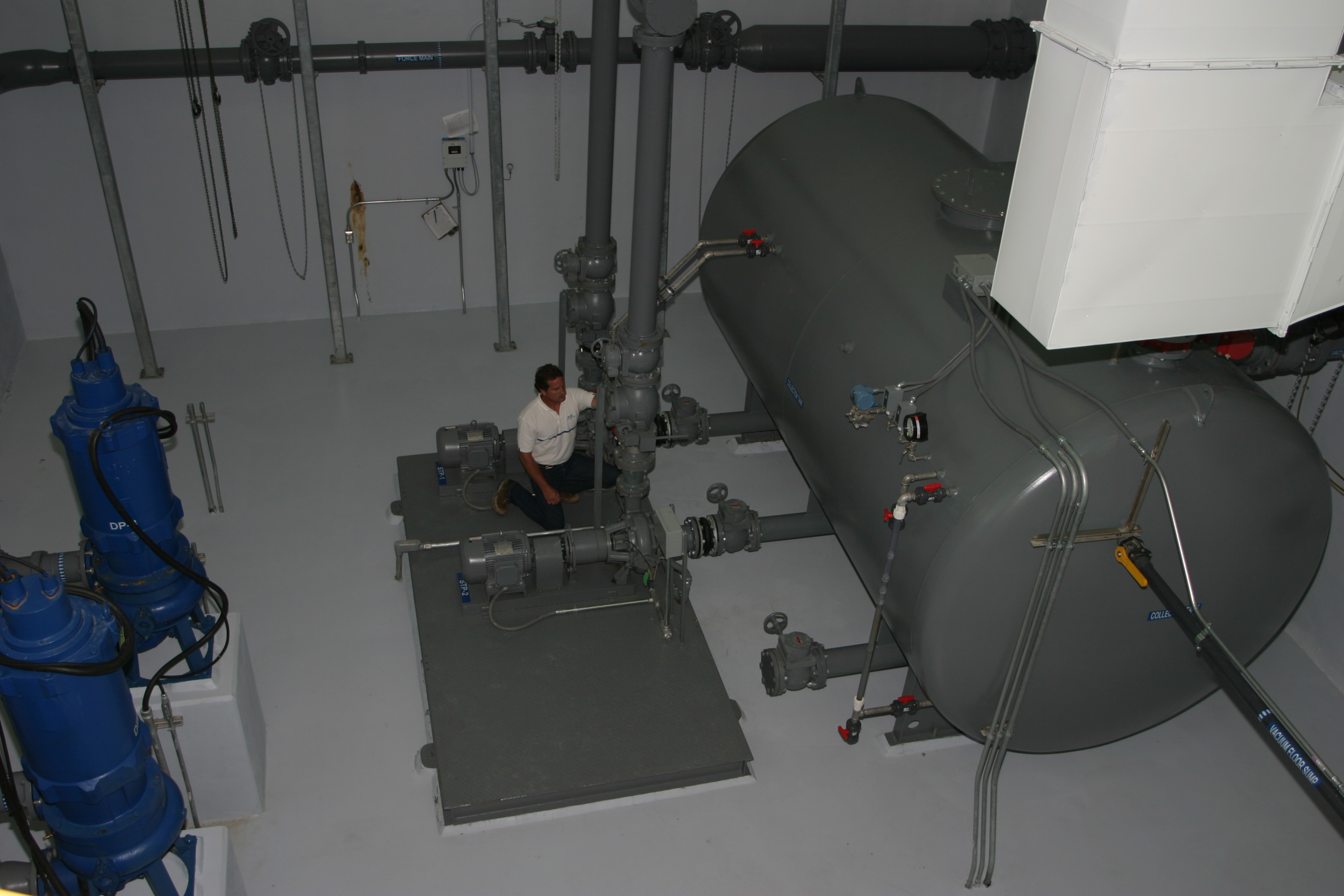
Vacuum station in Hooper, Utah

Vacuum sewer systems are considered to be free of ex- and infiltration which allows their use even in water protection areas. For this reason, vacuum sewer lines may even be laid in the same trench as potable water lines (depending on local guidelines).

In order to ensure reliable transport, the vacuum sewer line is laid in a saw-tooth (length-) profile. The whole vacuum sewers are filled with air at a pressure of -0.4 to -0.6 bar. The most important aspect for a reliable operation is the air-to-liquid ratio. When a system is well designed, the sewers contain only very small amounts of sewage. The air-to-liquid ratio is usually maintained by collecting liquid/air simultaneously or controller units that adjust their opening times according to the pressure in the system.

Sewers can be laid in flat terrain, and parts may flow uphill (within limits). A saw-tooth profile keeps sewer lines shallow; in frost-free climates, trench depth can be about 1.0 – 1.2 m. By contrast, gravity sewers need a monotonically falling slope of at least 0.5 - 1.0%, which can mean that expensive trenching and pumping stations are needed.

Once the wastewater arrives in the vacuum collection tank at the vacuum station, it is pumped to the discharge point, which could be either a gravity sewer or the treatment station. As the dwell time of the wastewater inside the system is very short and the wastewater is continuously mixed with air, the sewage is kept fresh and any fouling inside the system is avoided (less H_{2}S).

== Advantages ==
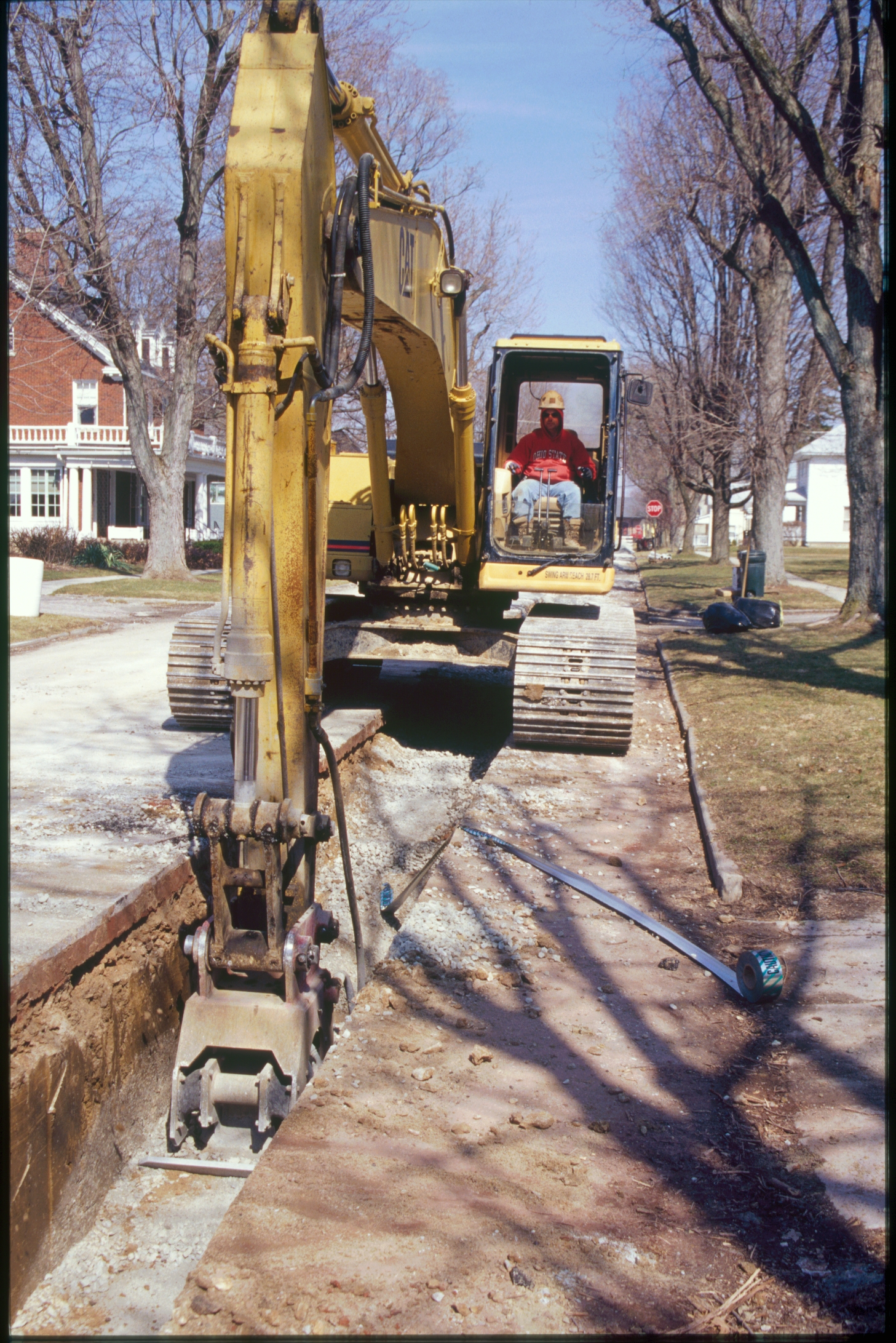
Minimal disruption for vacuum sewers

- closed, mechanical/pneumatical controlled system with a central vacuum station. Electrical energy is only needed at this central station
- no sedimentation due to self-cleansing high velocities
- spooling and maintenance of the sewer lines is not necessary
- manholes are not required
- Usually only a single vacuum pump station is required rather than multiple stations found in gravity and low pressure networks. This frees up land, reduces energy costs and reduces operational costs.
- investment costs can be reduced up to 50% due to simple trenching at shallow depths, close to surface
- flexibile piping allows obstacles to be over- or underpassed
- reduced installation time
- small diameter sewer pipes of HDPE, PVC materials; savings of material costs
- aeration of sewage, less development of H_{2}S, with its dangers for workers, inhabitants, as well as corrosion of the pipes may be avoided; sewage is kept fresh
- no odours along the closed vacuum sewers
- no stormwater infiltration, therefore less hydraulic load at the wastewater treatment plant
- no sewage leakages (vacuum avoids exfiltration), which is not only an ecological/public health benefit, but also makes repairs to the pipes easier and more sanitary for repair workers
- sewers may be laid in the same trench with other mains, also with potable water or storm-water, as well as in water protection areas
- Lower cost to maintain in the long term due to shallow trenching and easy identification of problems
- In combination of vacuum toilets it creates concentrated waste streams, which makes it feasible to use different waste water treatment techniques, like anaerobic treatment

== Disadvantages ==
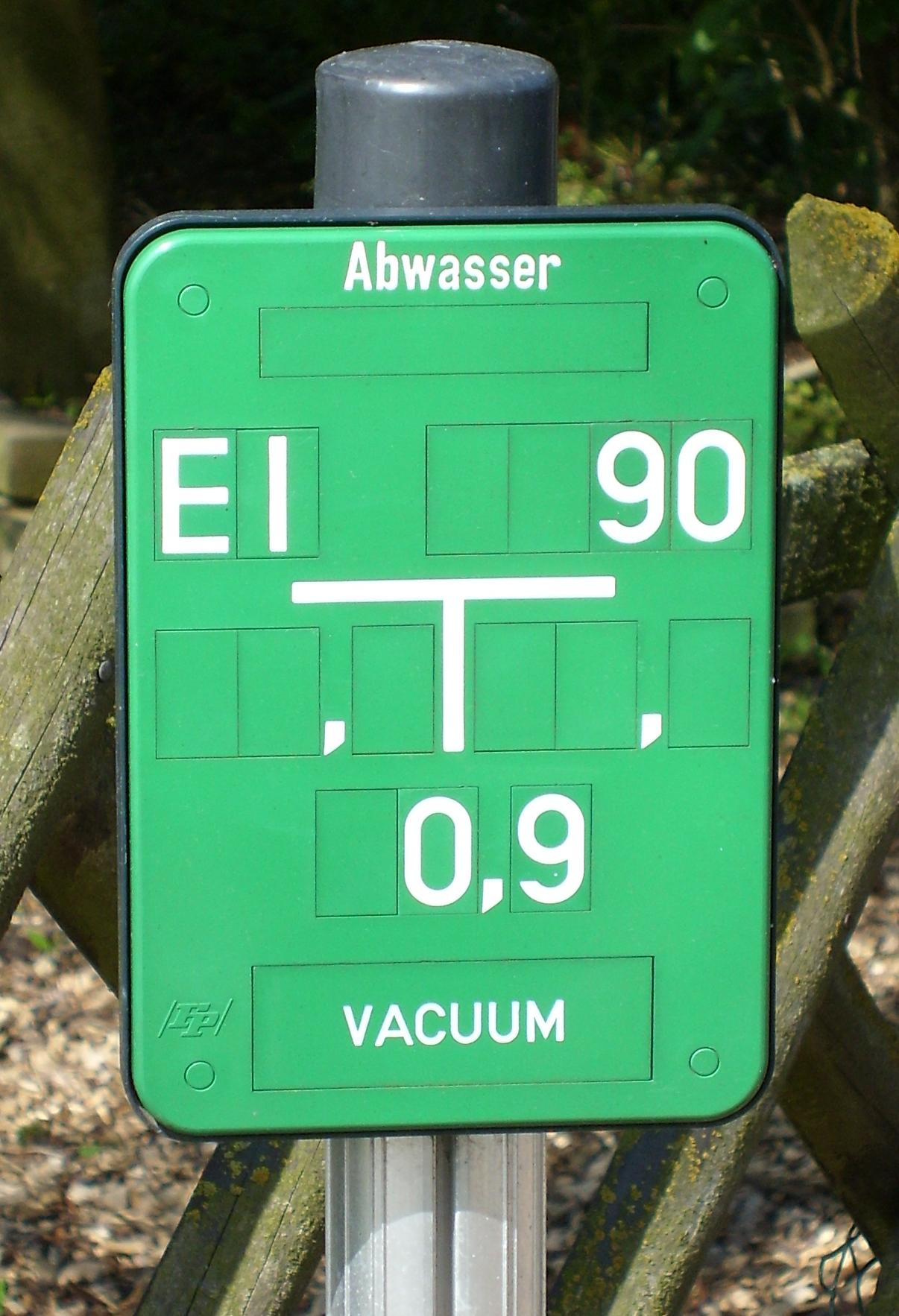
Sign indicating a buried vacuum sewer in Germany.

- vacuum systems are not capable of transporting sewage over very long distances, but can pump long distances from the vacuum station to the next sewage treatment plant or main gravity sewer.
- vacuum sewerage systems are only capable of the collection of wastewater within a separated system (not for the collection of storm water)
- the lines can only reach up to 3–4 km laid in flat area (restrictions of the system due to headlosses (3-4.5 m) (friction and static))
- systems should be designed with help of an experienced manufacturer (concepts are usually free of charge)
- external energy is required at the central vacuum station; an emergency power supply, such as a backup generator, is needed for power outages.
- odours close to the vacuum station can occur, a biofilter may be necessary
- integrity of the pipe joints is paramount
- grease can clog the sensor tube (if set up incorrectly) thus requiring preventative maintenance cleaning
- vacuum valves can get stuck open leading to pressure drops in the entire system. However, a monitoring system can help identifying stuck open valves immediately

== Applications ==
Vacuum sewer systems may be the preferred system in the case of particular circumstances, such as:

=== Transport ===
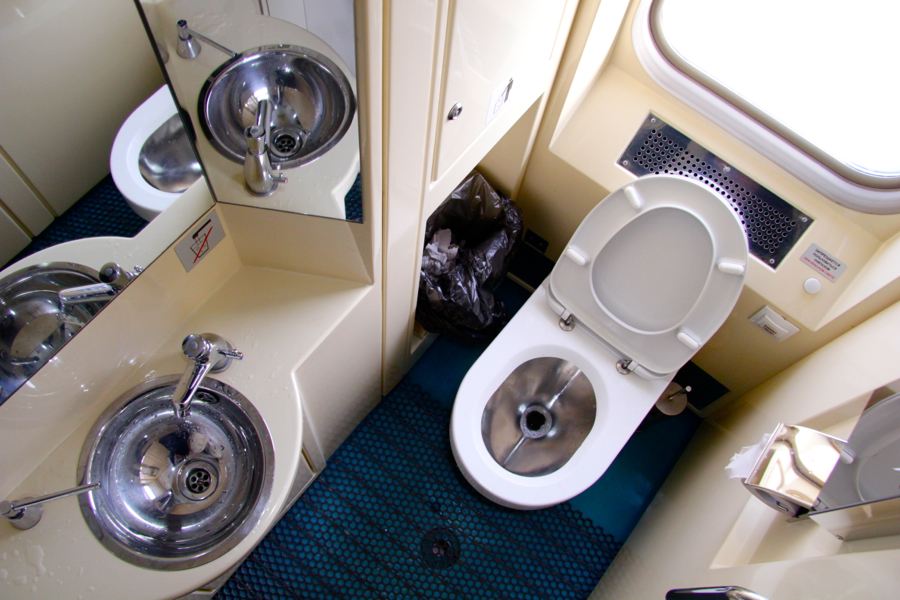
Vacuum toilet on a train

Trains, aircraft, buses, and many ships with plumbing generally have vacuum systems with vacuum toilets. The lower water usage (less than a quarter of a liter per flush) saves weight, and avoids water slopping out of the toilet bowl in motion. Aircraft toilets may flush with blue disinfectant solution rather than water. A portable collection chamber is used; if it is filled from an intermediate vacuum chamber, it need not be kept under vacuum.

=== Dry areas ===
Lack of water in many countries and drastic water savings measures have led to difficulties with aging gravity networks with solids blocking in the pipes. Vacuum systems save water.

=== Boggy, rocky, or permafrost terrain ===
Flat terrain, unfavorable soil (rocky or swampy ground), or a high groundwater table (which requires dewatering trenches) can make gravity sewerage systems much more expensive. Vacuum sewers are small in diameter and leak inwards, and in frost-free areas, they can be laid close to the surface in small trenches.

=== Water protection areas, environmental use ===
Vacuum sewers can pass through water protection areas and areas with sensitive high ground water tables, because there is no danger of spoiling groundwater resources (vacuum sewers have a high leak tightness due to their material; and if they leak, they leak inwards). Vacuum systems are used in many environmentally sensitive areas such as the Couran Cove Eco Resort close to the Barrier Reef in Australia. They've also been used to replace septic tanks to reduce nitrogen levels in ground/surface water.

Vacuum systems have also been applied to collect toxic wastewater from the environment.

=== Seasonally sub-freezing climates ===
If the temperatures in an area dip below freezing in winter, the vacuum line is buried below the frost line, in ground that stays unfrozen year-round (as are conventional gravity sewers). Valves, collection pits, intake vents, and control systems need to be designed to keep functioning despite cold, snow and ice. Temperature-monitoring sensors are also standard, so problems can be noticed early.

In the case of Plum Island (Massachusetts), the island was prone to freezing temperature and excessive snowfall that initially made it difficult to locate a potential problem. Changes to their Pit setup and monitoring at the valve pit has helped with maintenance.

Many Nordic Countries utilize vacuum sewers, it is helpful to have some type of marker or monitoring to locate valves when they are buried under the snow for extended periods.

=== Low or seasonal population density ===
With lower population densities, the costs for the collection chambers and vacuum stations are less important than the costs of installing pipe and, for gravity sewers, pumping stations, etc.. Pneumatic pipes are generally smaller than gravity-drained hydraulic ones In frost-free climates, the pipes for a vacuum system can also be buried more shallowly than a gravity system.

High specific conduit lengths, where the required pipe length is longer than ~4 metres per inhabitant, will tend to make a vacuum system cheaper.

In seasonal settlements (recreation areas, camping sites etc.) with conventional gravity sewer systems, sedimentation problems can easily occur as automatic flushing by daily waste water does not take place. High flow velocities within vacuum sewers prevent such sedimentation problems. The Formula 1 race tracks in Shanghai and Abu Dhabi are using a vacuum sewer system for that reason.

=== Historic sites ===
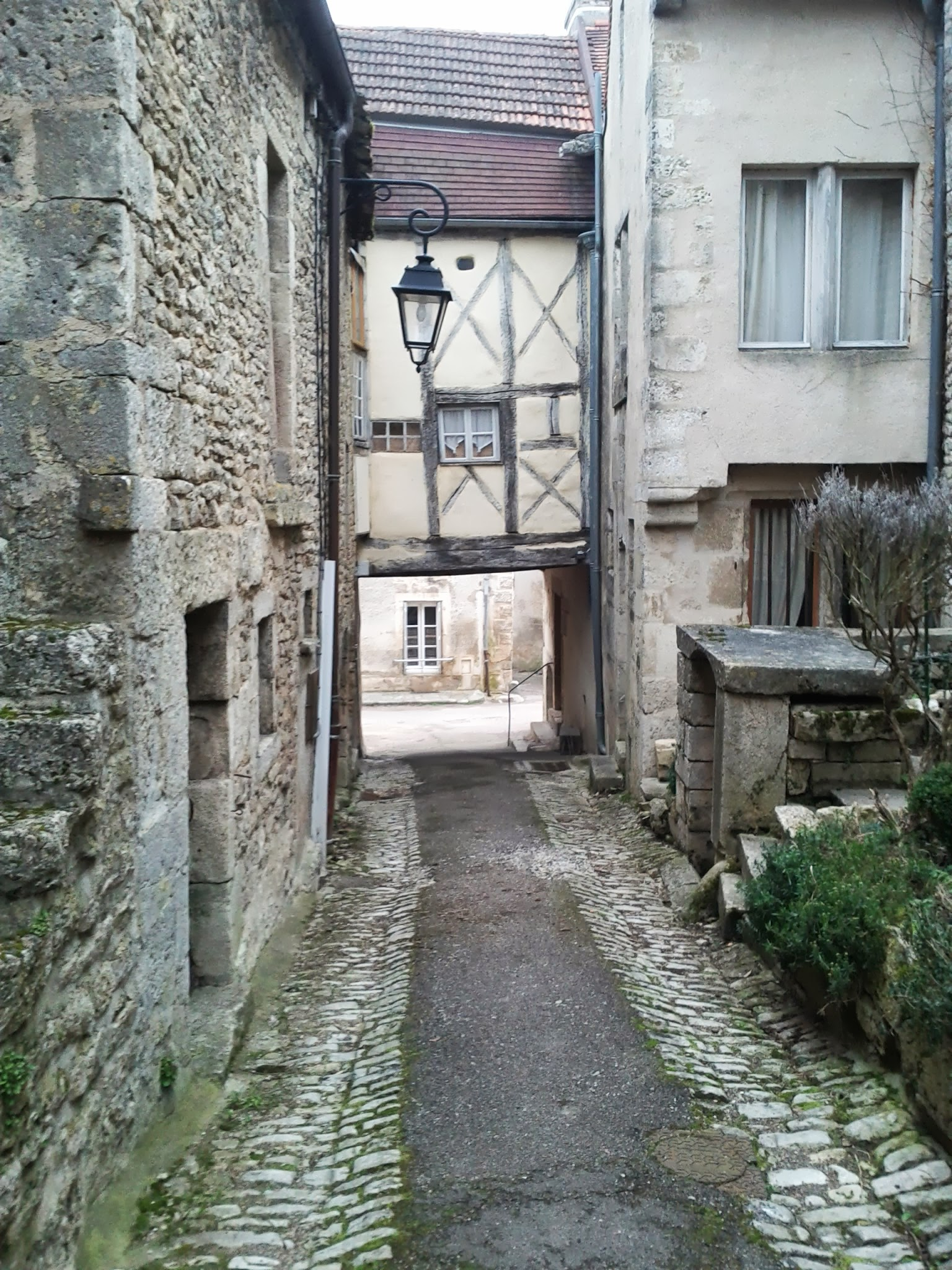
A side road in Flavigny-sur-Ozerain where it would be difficult to install a conventional gravity sewer

Historic sites may have old buildings, narrow streets, and steep terrain. Tourism may also cause strong seasonal fluctuations in population density. Vacuum sewer systems may be selected for their fast (avoiding conflicts with traffic and tourism), cost-effective and flexible installation. Examples include Flavigny-sur-Ozerain, France, and Khasab and Al Seeb in Oman.

== Treatment ==
Vacuum sewer systems can be set up so that they collect concentrated blackwater (toilet wastewater) only, with the greywater from sinks and baths being collected separately (it is much easier to treat greywater than blackwater). The biosolids from a vacuum system need not be diluted with flushing water.

Sewage systems usually thermophilically compost biosolids which have been separated and dewatered from a standard gravity sewer. This process is simpler if the biosolids are never watered.

Composting at high temperatures kills pathogens and seeds. Biosolids compost is required to be composted at high temperatures.

Sewage can also be treated in an anaerobic process with the production of biogas. This design has the potential to increase sustainability of water infrastructures.

== Examples ==
=== Arctic ===
- In the Bering Strait region of Western Alaska both the Native Village of Savoonga, located on St. Lawrence Island, population 600, and the Native Village of Saint Michael located on Norton Sound, have been using vacuum sewer systems for years.
- Selawik, renovated its vacuum sewer system in 2014, saving over $217,000 a year on energy costs.

=== Arid regions ===
- Especially in the Middle East (United Arab Emirates, Qatar, Bahrain, Oman), vacuum sewer systems become more and more important due to easy and fast installation along with water saving effects and easiness of maintenance.
- Palm Island Jumeirah, located at the coast of Dubai City, United Arab Emirates, has low, flat terrain, with a high water table, a water protection area, a need to conserve freshwater, and a low population density. It has therefore installed a vacuum sewer system. Approx. 23,000 people (or 2000 buildings) will be connected to this vacuum sewer system. The system has only one central vacuum station serving 40 km of sewer line. The vacuum station is considered to be the biggest vacuum station in the world.
- The eco-city of Masdar, U.A.E., uses a vacuum sewer system as well to separate grey from black water.
- Lately, vacuum sewer systems become popular for industrial and commercial projects as well, where only little domestic waste water occurs and where the flexibility of a vacuum sewer system allows easy coordination with usually plenty of other utilities in the ground. Good examples can be found again in the Middle East, such as some small industrial areas in the Emirate of Ras al Khaimah or the newly built Qatalum Aluminium Plant in Qatar, the world's largest primary aluminium plant.
- Vacuum sewer systems are not only used in the Europe or Middle East but even in low developed third world countries. Several vacuum sewer systems have been already built or are currently under construction in Africa (South Africa, Botswana, Namibia) for townships and rural areas where the benefit of fast construction time, cost saving trenching and high flexibility have come to full effect.
- Australia has been one of the largest users of vacuum sewer systems due to the low installation and operational costs. The largest system to-date has been at the Tea Gardens development in New South Wales, which will ultimately handle over 4,500 houses. The Water Corporation in Western Australia is considered the largest single owner of vacuum systems in the world with over 30 schemes now under their operational control.

=== High water table areas ===
- The United Kingdom is well served by vacuum sewerage systems. The region most extensively served is the low lying fenlands of the East of England. High water tables (in some cases less than 1 metre below the surface) and poor ground conditions have meant that the local water company, Anglian Water, has embraced the use of vacuum sewerage, taking advantage of the system's requirement for small bore sewer pipes laid in shallow trenches, dramatically reducing the requirement for pumping stations as would be required by conventional gravity sewer systems. The largest vacuum sewerage scheme in this region serves the villages of Outwell and Upwell; four vacuum collection stations serve some 1500 homes in this agglomeration. On initial costings for a conventional gravity sewer to serve the area, previously served by domestic septic settlement tanks the site would have required the installation of 32 pumping stations. Using a vacuum sewer system, this number of pumping stations was reduced to four vacuum stations. Other companies in the UK such as Southern Water operate vacuum sewer systems, too.
- In northern Germany, several hundred systems have been operating since the 1970s. More are planned. Hamburg's 770-unit Jenfelder Au development was planned with vacuum sewers.
- The city of Ocean Shores, Washington has one of the largest vacuum systems in the world, and it is also mature; most of its components are more than 20 years old and must function in a challenging operational environment along with gravity sewer and grinder pump systems.
- The county of Sarasota, Florida and other localities in Florida have adopted vacuum systems, in some cases as an anti-eutrophication measure.
- The city of Carnation, Washington is developing a collection system that incorporates vacuum sewers.
- Good examples can be found on the Maldives, the post-tsunami WATSAN project UNICEF - UN, where on several islands vacuum sewer systems have been the best option. Several other project, mainly for resorts, have already been realized on the Maldives.
- Provincetown, Massachusetts, USA

=== Areas with seasonal freezing ===
- The biggest installation in Europe (several vacuum stations) can be found in Gerasdorf (near Vienna), Austria, where many benefits of a vacuum sewer system helped to overcome difficult conditions in this mountainous area.
- Estonia has vacuum sewers.
- Poland has vacuum sewers.

== Ruling technical guidelines and norms ==
- EN 16932-3:2018 Drain and sewer systems outside buildings
- DWA-A 120-3
- WEF (Water Environment Federation) Alternative Sewer Systems (Second Edition -2008)
- WSA 07 (Australian Code)
- AS 4310 - 2004 (Australian Vacuum Interface Valve Standard)

== See also ==
- Gravity sewer (the more common competing system)
- Composting toilet (an application for vacuum toilet-and-sewer systems)
- Pneumatics
