= Green train corridor =

Initiative for sanitary sewage disposal on railways

Green train corridor describes a concept where train coach toilet waste is no longer discharged directly on tracks. The trains instead feature built-in technology so that toilet waste is stored in a tank under every coach toilet, and is discharged into large drainage canals built along the line beside the tracks in main halting junctions.

On 24 July 2016, India's railway minister Suresh Prabhu announced that country's first Green Rail Corridor on the Manamadurai-Rameswaram line for the first time in Southern Railways Madurai Division.

== See also ==
- Passenger train toilet
- Swachh Bharat Mission
- Water supply and sanitation in India
