= Passenger train toilet =

Types of toilets in passenger trains

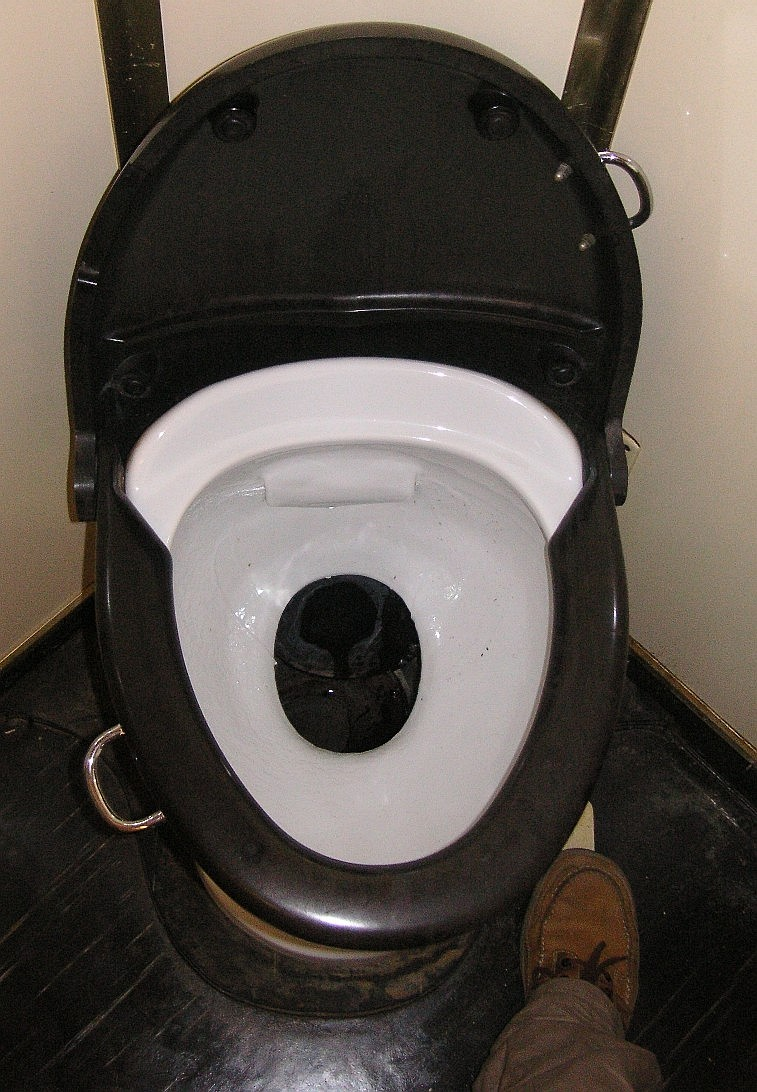
Traditional hole in the floor system, operated by a pedal, in an Austrian train

Many passenger trains (usually medium- and long-distance) have toilet facilities, often at the ends of carriages. Toilets suitable for wheelchair users are larger, and hence trains with such facilities may not have toilets in each carriage.

== Hopper toilet ==
Squat hopper toilet in Special Express No. 14 (Chiang Mai-Krung Thep Aphiwat) while the train was between Chiang Mai and Lamphun stations.

The traditional method of disposing human waste from trains is to deposit the waste onto the tracks or, more often, onto nearby ground, using what is known as a hopper toilet. This ranges from a hole in the floor to full-flush system (possibly with sterilization). The hole in the floor (also known as a drop chute toilet or direct flush toilet) system is still in use in many parts of the world, particularly on older rolling stock. The principal disadvantage is that it can be considered crude or unhygienic, and dangerous to both human health and the environment, as it litters the railway lines and can convey serious health risks when the train passes over or under a waterway.

Passengers may be discouraged from flushing or using toilets while the train is at a station, or standing at a red signal. To enforce this limitation, toilets may be automatically locked when the train pulls into a station, or stops at a red signal. In the United States, railway employees were required to lock the toilets closed whenever a passenger train stood in a station, or at any other location designated by instructions in the timetable. Toilets would promptly be unlocked upon departure.

Properly designed drop chute toilets will draw air like a chimney, pulling air through the lavatory door vents and down and out through the toilet, reducing odor. Hopper toilets are similar to old-fashioned sea toilets in that they release the excreta directly to the environment, untreated.

In the United States, Amtrak phased out its use of these toilets in the 1980s after waste from a Silver Meteor train crossing the St. Johns River in Florida, between Palatka and DeLand, landed on a fisherman who filed a lawsuit.

In the UK, at the end of 2019, hopper toilets on timetabled passenger services remained in use. A plan to protect all rail workers and reduce public health risks was delayed with several operators applying for waivers.

In 2021, Indian Railways completed the phaseout of drop chute toilets, replacing them with indigenously developed bio-toilets. Apart from improving hygiene, the phaseout will save Indian Railways 4 billion rupees annually, due to the elimination of corrosion on the rails caused by human waste. They were replaced with bio-vacuum toilets, which use bacteria to decompose human waste, fulfilling a phaseout pledge made in 2010.

Some heritage railways such as Swanage Railway continue to use drop chute toilets on many of their preserved carriages. On the occasion that services operate through to Wareham on the South West Main Line, passengers are requested not to use the lavatories when on Network Rail tracks.

== Chemical holding tank ==
Chemical holding tanks (retention tanks) are usually included on newer carriages and railcars in wealthier and more densely populated parts of the world. One issue is that the tanks need to be regularly emptied, often at a terminal station or prolonged stop-over. If a train needs to be used again quickly, the tanks may not get emptied. In this case, toilets may back up, which can result in toilets being closed.

== Vacuum toilet ==
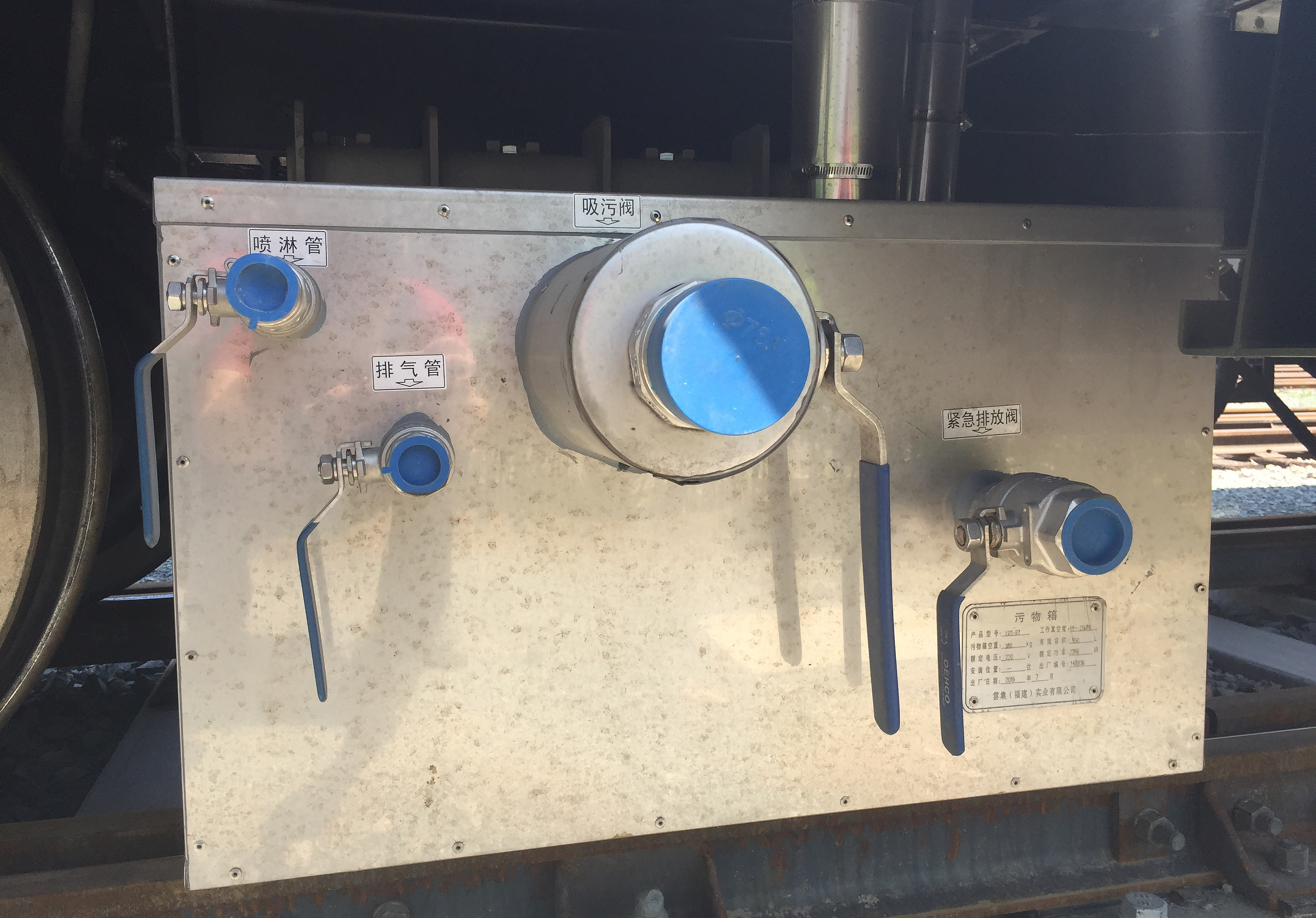
Vacuum waste tank on a China Railway 25T coach

Vacuum systems used in the newest carriages are similar to those in airliners: waste is pulled into a holding tank with a high pressure pump. Their disadvantages are the same as of chemical holding tanks, in addition they require stable power supply for working, and flushing of anything but water and human waste (e.g. paper towels) can easily break the pump.

== Composting toilet ==
Some trains may have composting toilet tanks, which use bacterial action to break down solid and liquid waste. Only the broken down clean liquid is released to the trackbed after sterilisation. The solid waste only has to be emptied every half year. This type of toilet is in use in some trains in the Netherlands, Switzerland, and the United States.

== Cultural references ==
In the United States, Dvořák's tune "Humoresque Number 7" became the setting for a series of mildly scatological humorous verses, regarding passenger train toilets, beginning:

Passengers will please refrain
From flushing toilets while the train
Is standing in the station (I love you)...

In The Good Soldier Svejk, author Jaroslav Hašek used hypocatastasis to indicate the fruit of hopper toilets, while conveying soldiers' envy and contempt for their general officer:

In the station restaurant the general began to speak again about the latrines and to say how ugly it looked when there were cactuses everywhere on the track. Meanwhile he ate beef steak and all of them imagined that he had a cactus in his mouth.

== Gallery ==
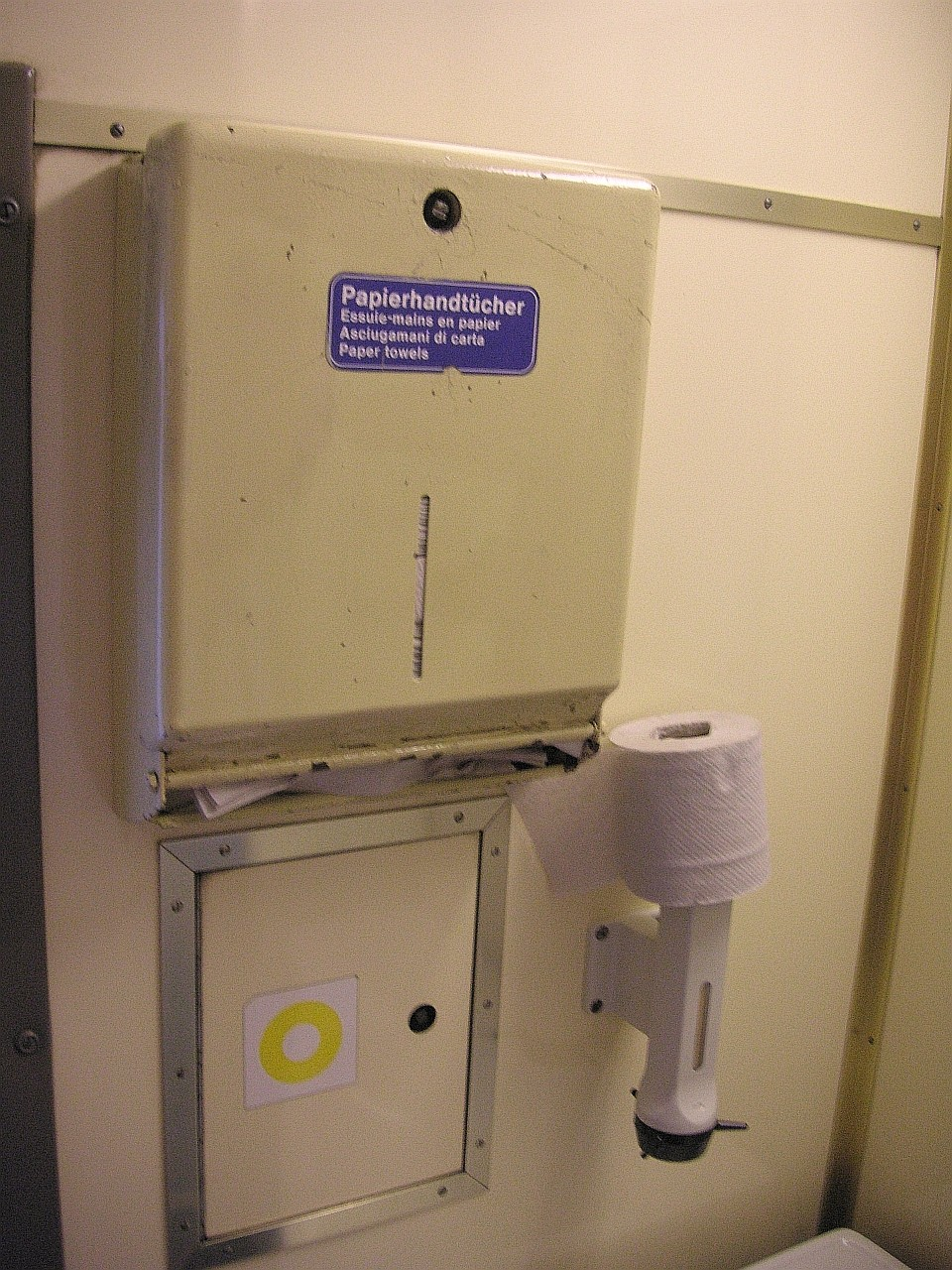
The basics: paper towels, toilet roll and soap dispenser

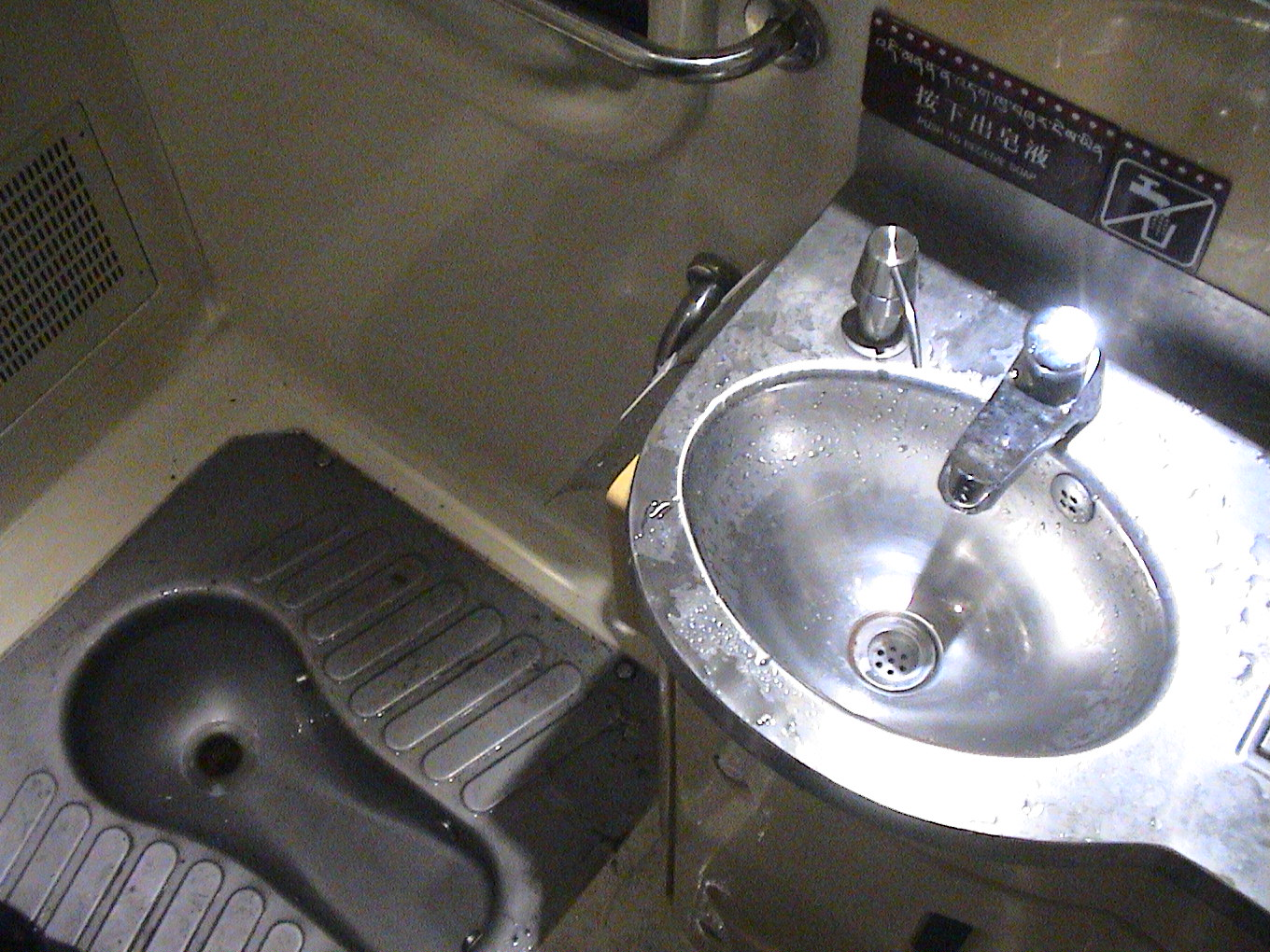
Squat toilet in Chinese train

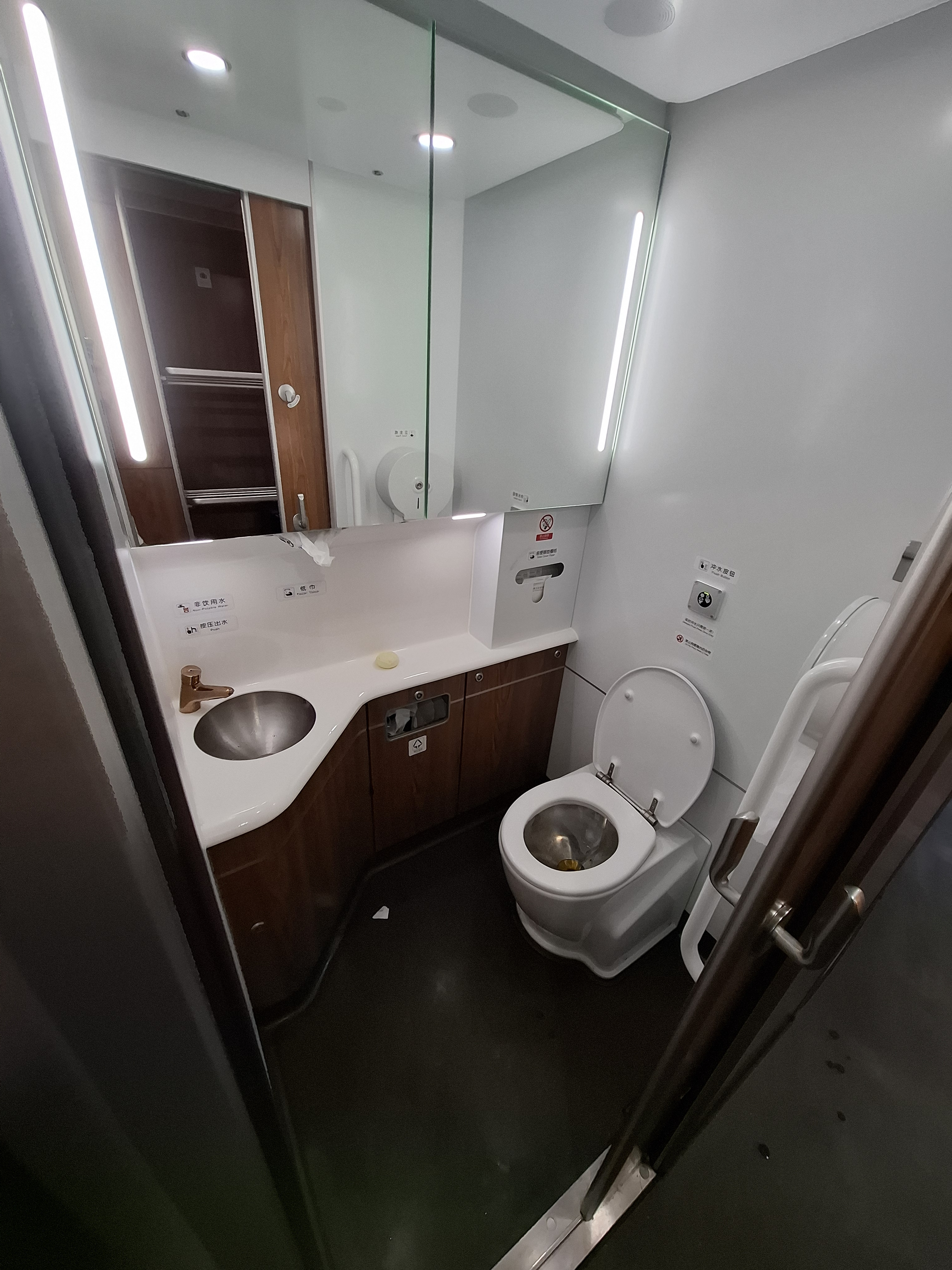
Toilet in Chinese High Speed train(G3551)

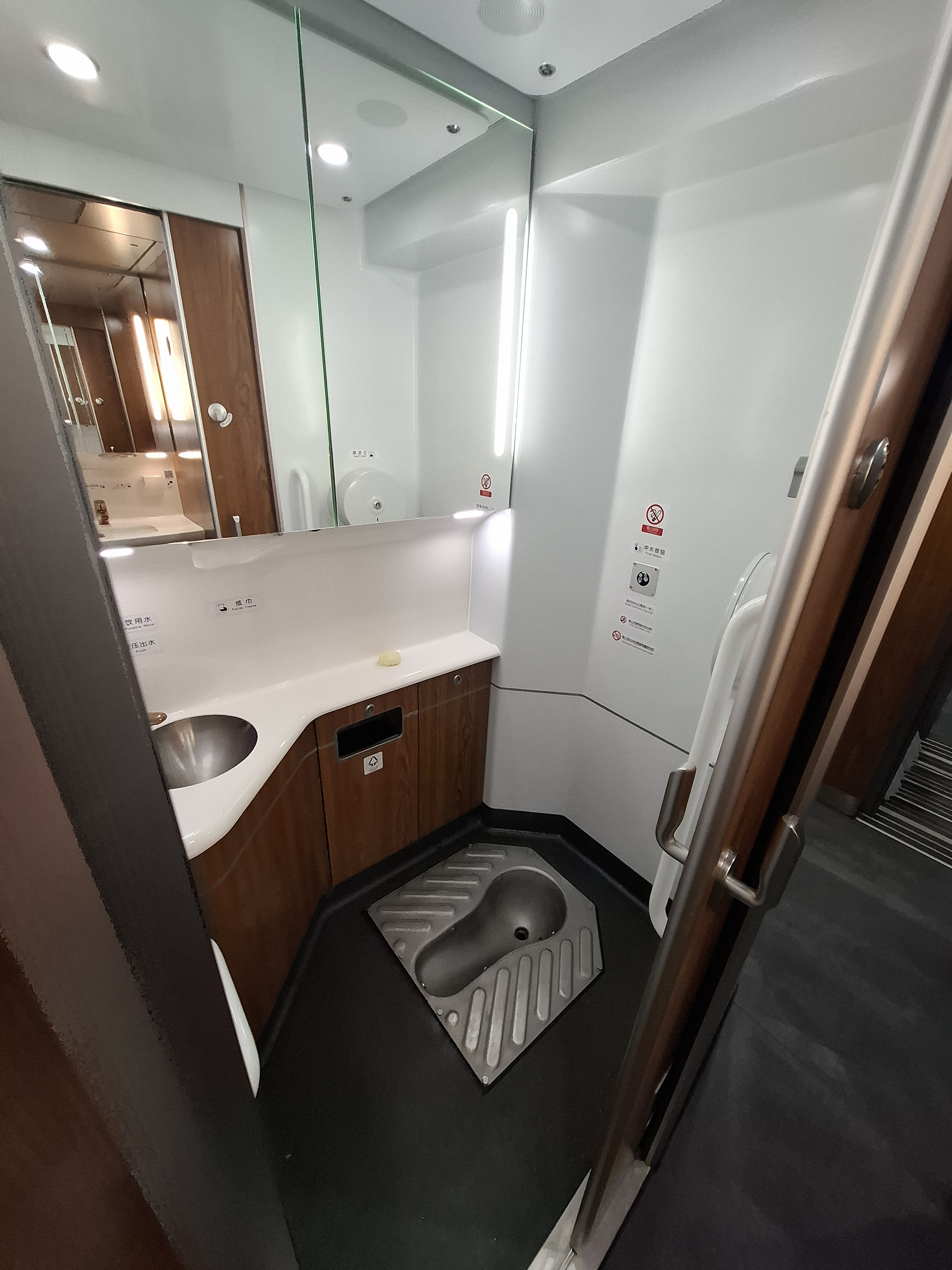
Squat toilet in Chinese High Speed train (G3551)

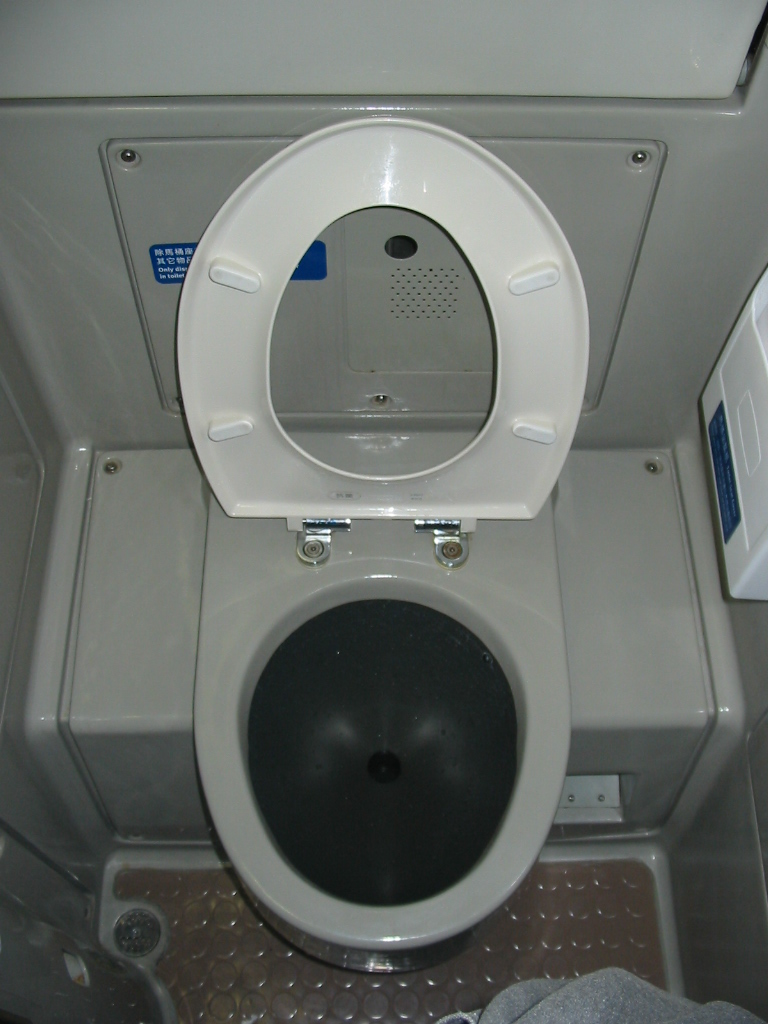
Toilet in Taiwan high speed rail train

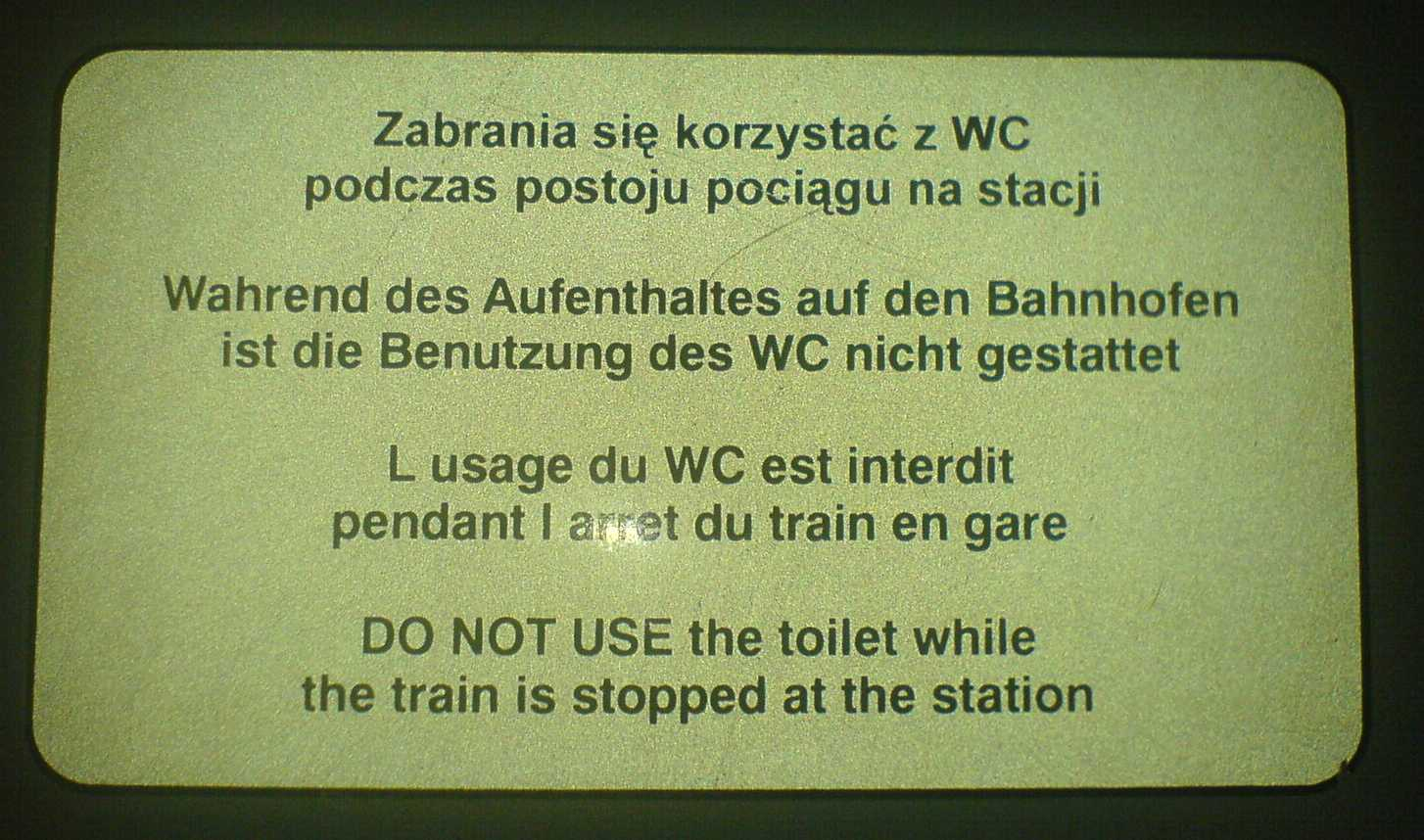
"DO NOT USE the toilet while the train is stopped at the station" notice in Polish, German, French, and English, displayed by Polish State Railways

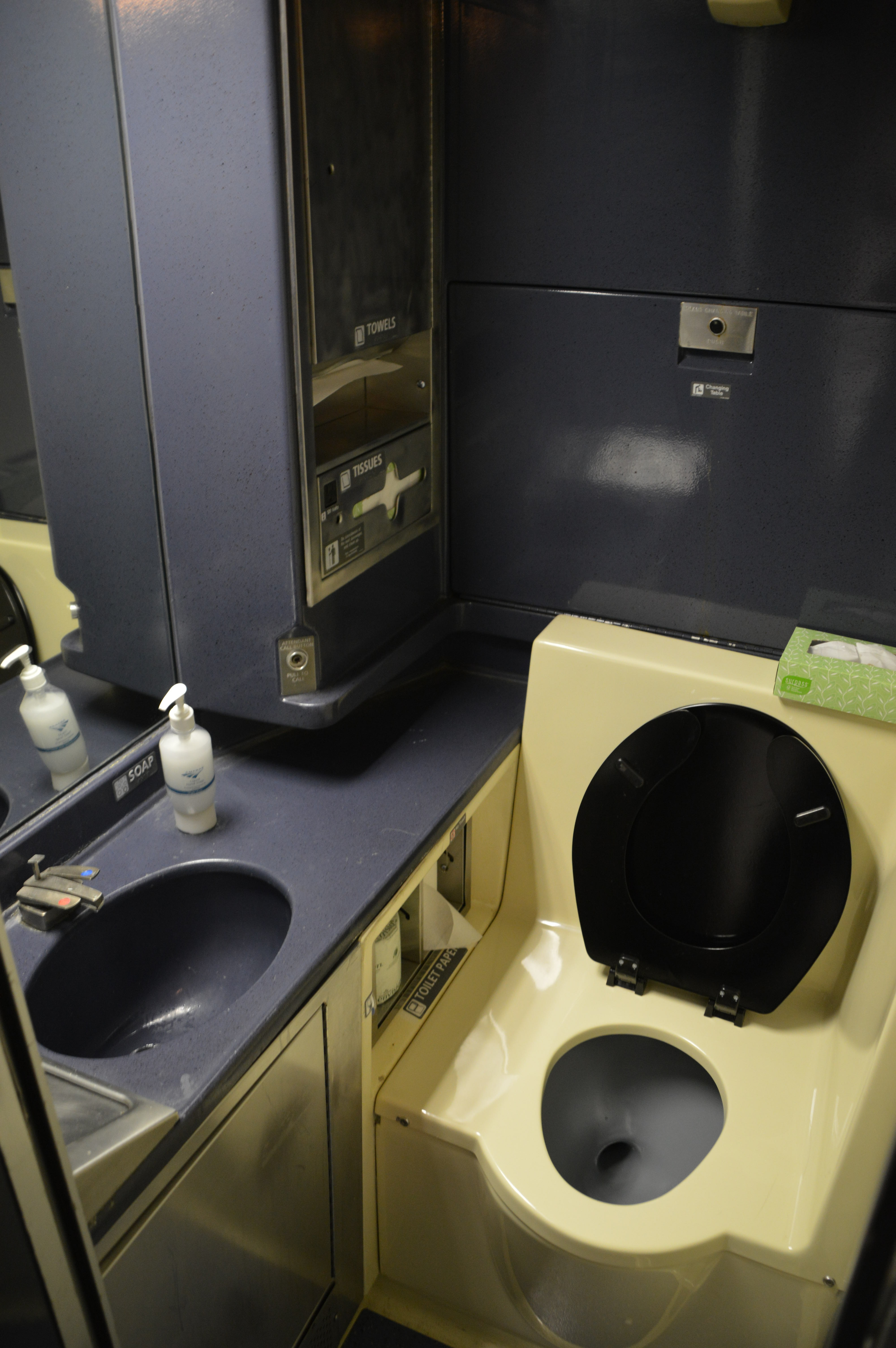
This is one of several restrooms on the lower level of Superliner #34960

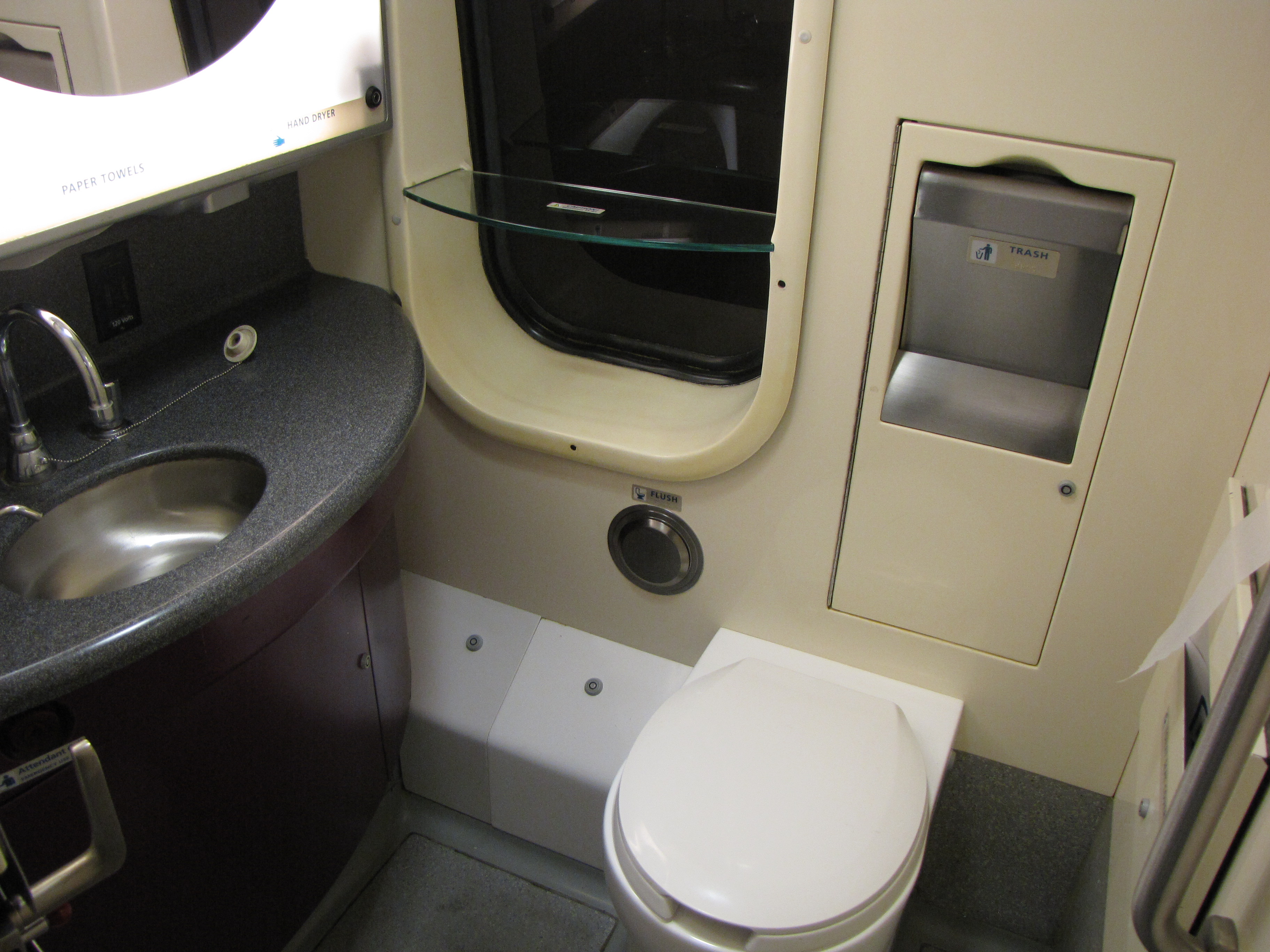
A restroom on Amtrak's Acela Express

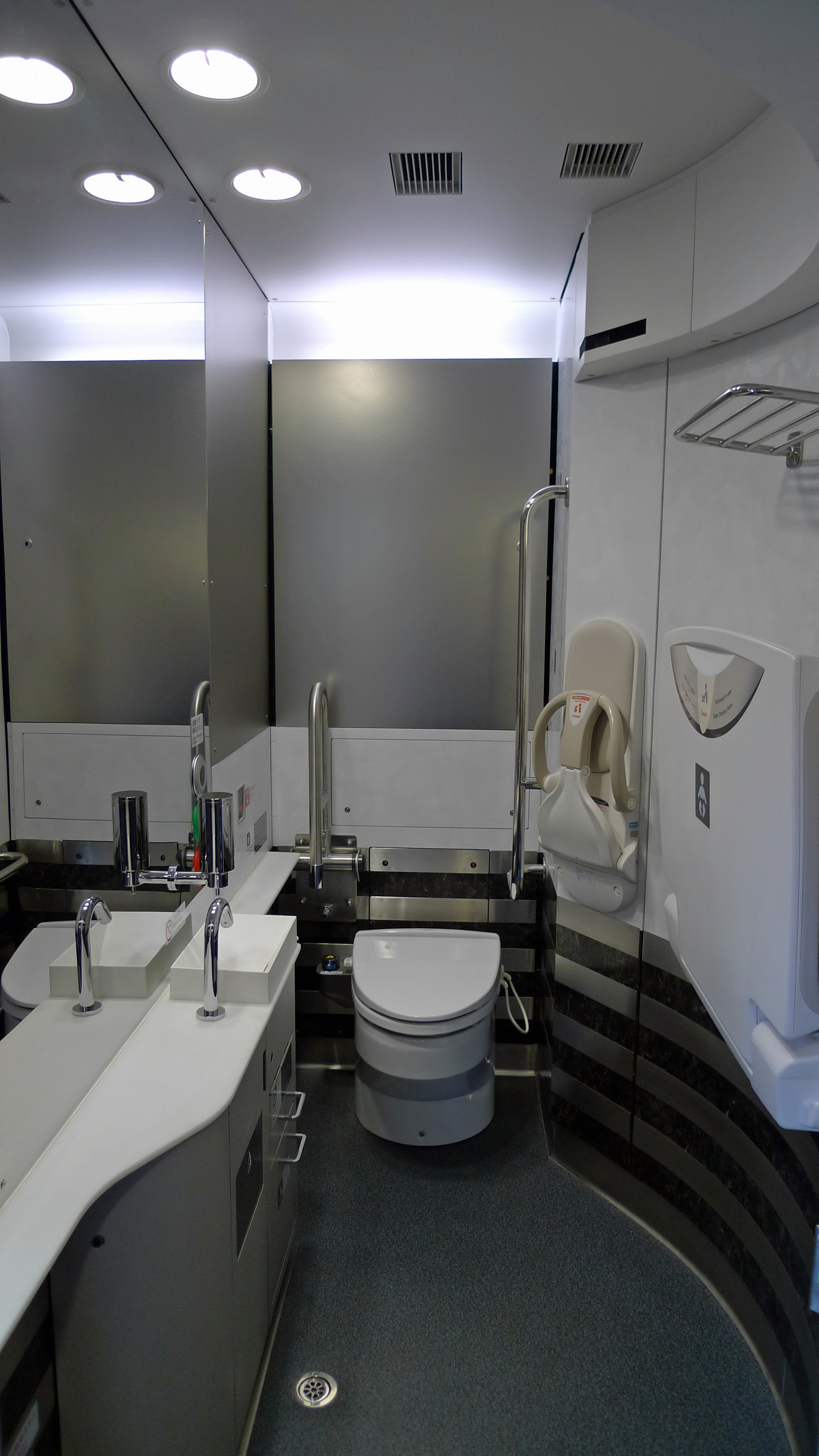
Universal access toilet of Japanese Keisei AE series

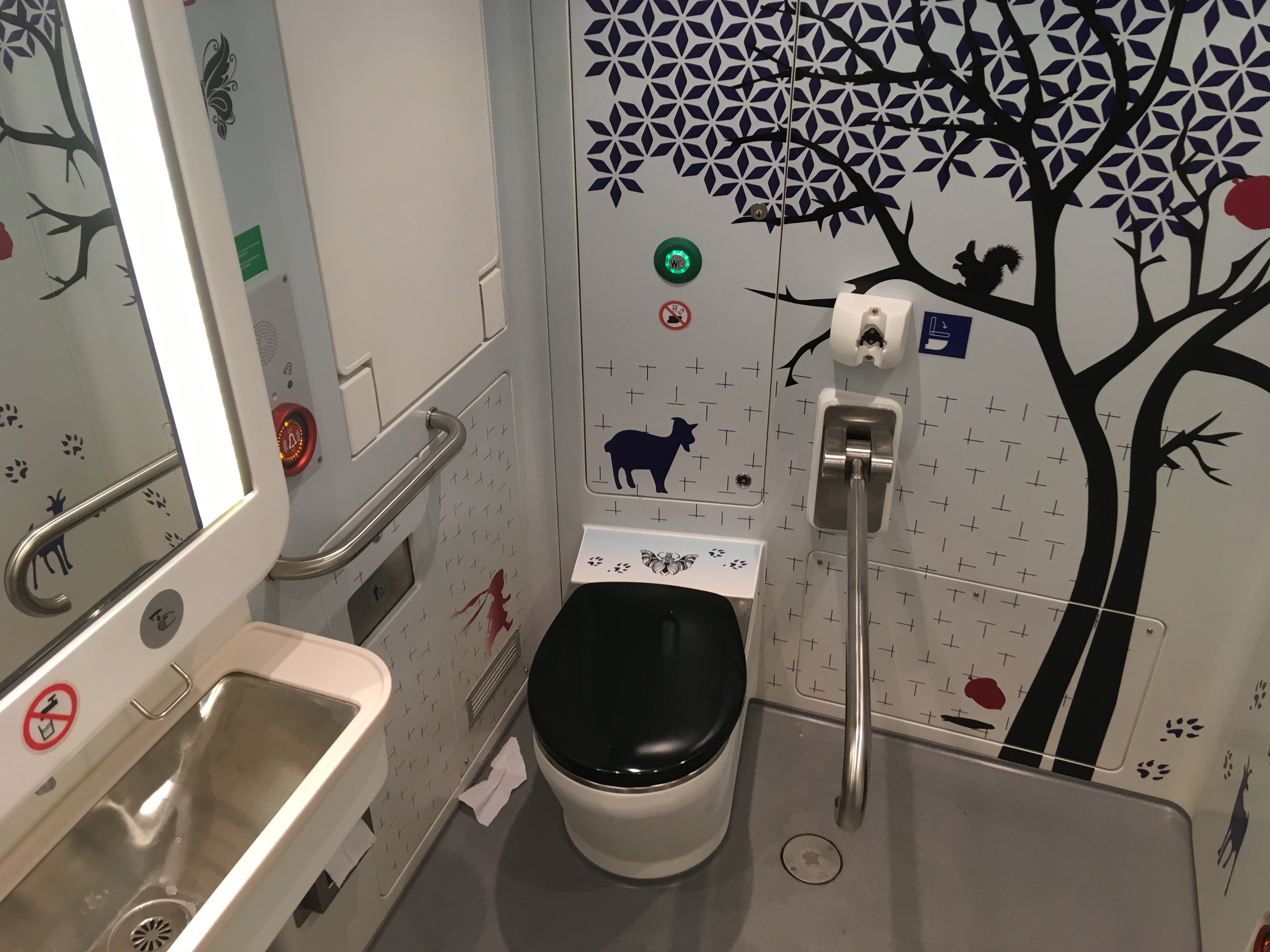
Universal access toilet of Dutch NS Sprinter Lighttrain

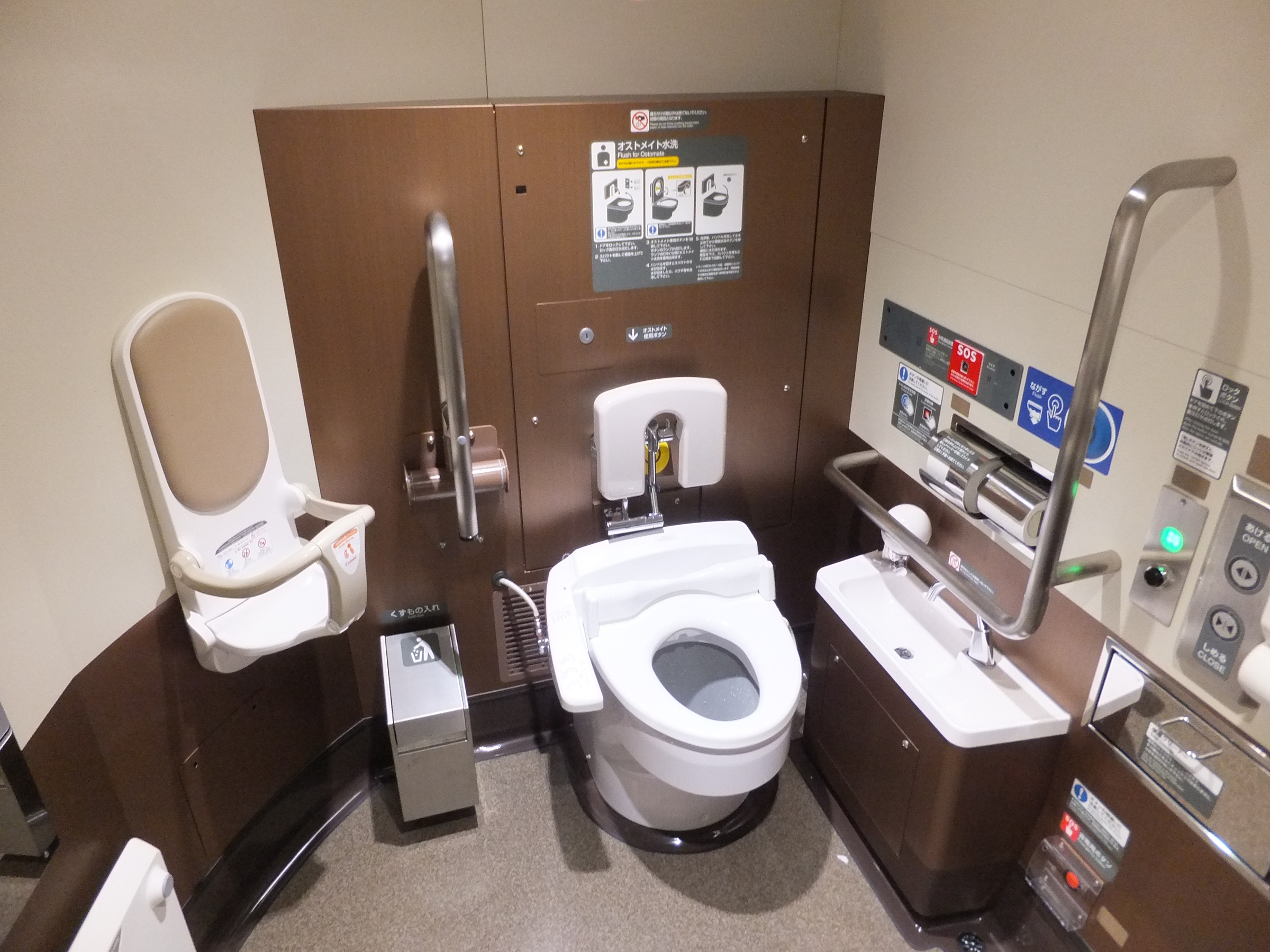
Wheelchair-accessible toilet of Japanese Shinkansen (E6 Series)

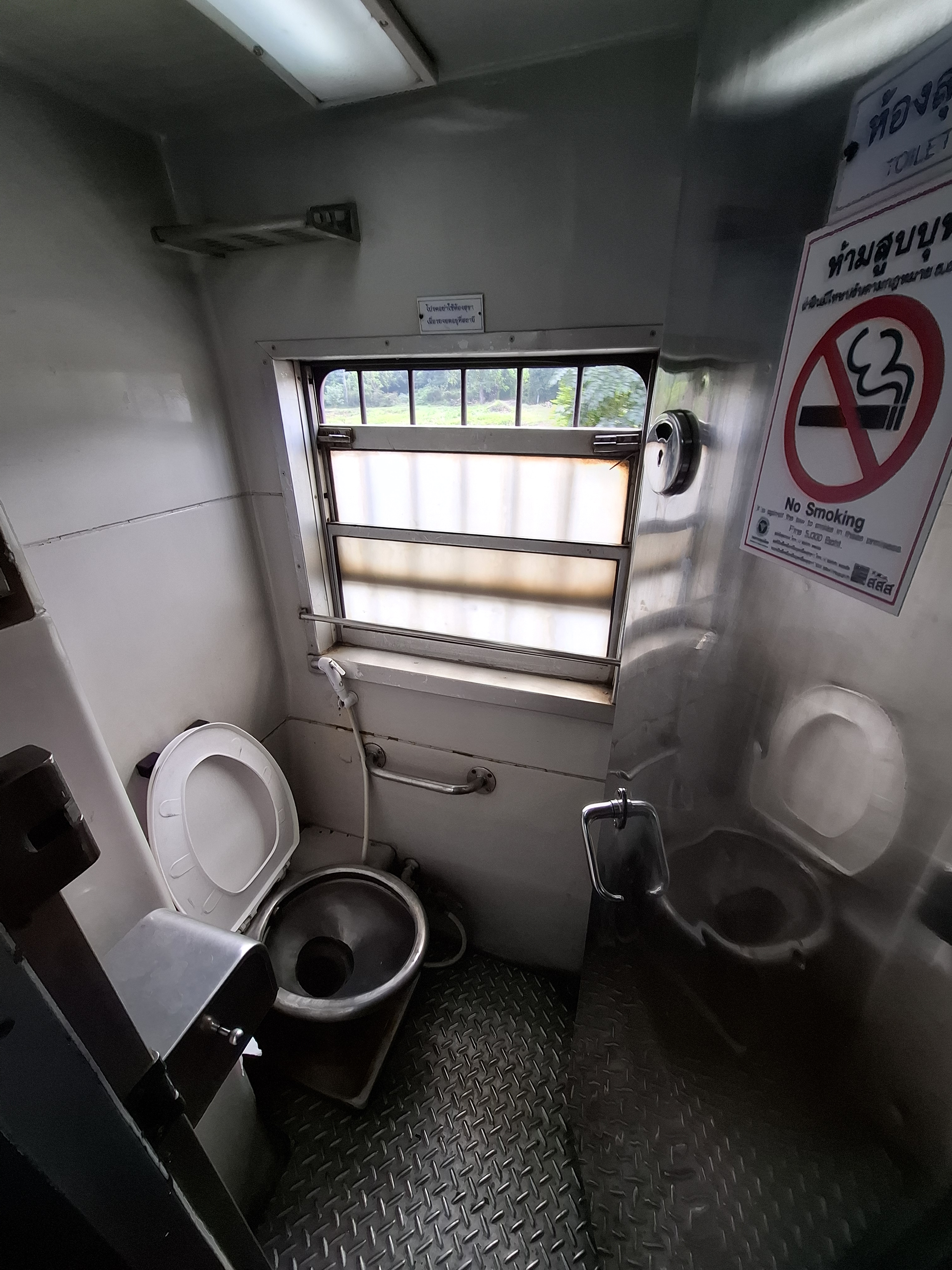
Toilet in Express No. 51 (Krung Thep Aphiwat – Chiang Mai)

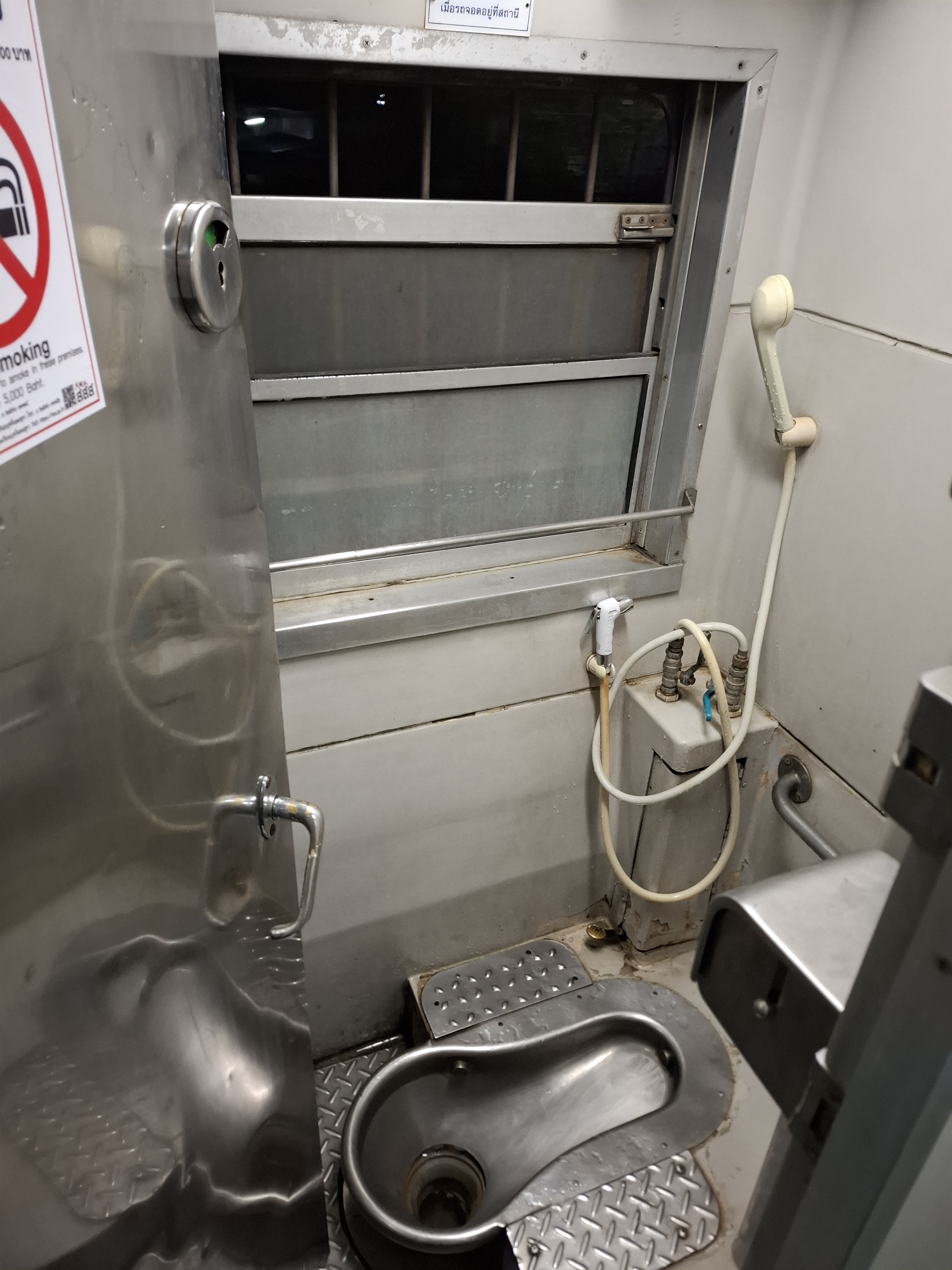
Squat toilet in Express No. 51 (Krung Thep Aphiwat – Chiang Mai)

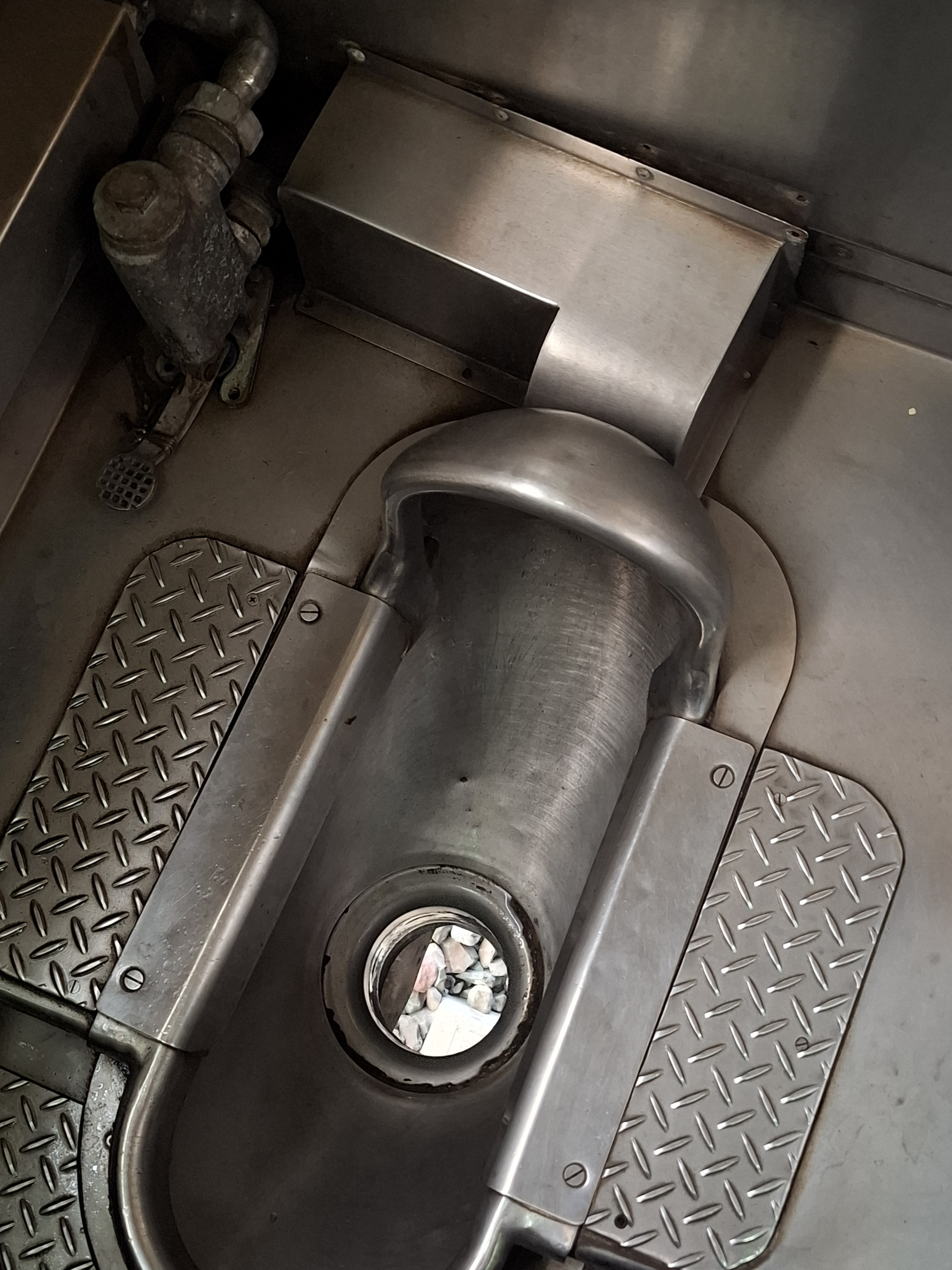
Hopper toilet in Special Express No. 14 (Chiang Mai – Krung Thep Aphiwat) while the train was stopped at Lamphun railway station

== See also ==
- Accessible toilet
- Aircraft lavatory
- Green train corridor
