= Lindsey Grayzel =

Documentary filmmaker

- Born: Lindsey Goodwin
- Occupation: Filmmaker
- Years active: 1994–present
- Known for: Felony arrest while filming Trans Mountain Pipeline protest

Lindsey Grayzel (also credited as Lindsey Goodwin-Grayzel) is a documentary filmmaker from Portland, Oregon. She started as an editor in 1994 then became producer and director in 1999.

While filming for her documentary The Reluctant Radical, she was arrested and charged with criminal sabotage and other felonies while filming a protest break-in at the Trans Mountain Pipeline in Skagit County, Washington in October 2016, the same day as another filmmaker was arrested at a Keystone Pipeline site in Pembina County, North Dakota. According to The Guardian and Filmmaker magazine, Grayzel was outside a fenced area filming the protest inside a no-trespassing area. Filmmaker also reported that Grayzel was subjected to a strip search before being jailed. Charges against Grayzel were dropped the next month.

== Personal life ==
Abraham and Lindsey Grayzel (nee Goodwin) married in 1996. Their son Ben Grayzel is also a filmmaker. He produced Northwest Trees in 2015 while a student at Cleveland High School in Portland.

== Filmography ==
- Inside Iraq: The Untold Stories (2004) (editor) OCLC 60350343
- Dark Water Rising: Survival Stories of Hurricane Katrina Animal Rescues (2006) (2006) (editor)
- Switch: A Community in Transition (2009) (editor) OCLC 698203512 OCLC 945433414
- Lessons from Iraq (2010) (editor) OCLC 670935618
- Understanding Suicide, Supporting Children (2011) (producer/director) OCLC 843202963
- Supporting the grieving child (2012) OCLC 906573511
- The journey : a story of healing and hope (2014) OCLC 919211812
- Supporting the grieving student (2014) OCLC 961474424
- ná·qc tımíne wısí·x: Of One Heart (2014) (editor) for Nez Perce National Historical Park OCLC 910945215
- Where Ice and Ocean Meet (2015) (editor), the first documentary made for Kenai Fjords National Park
- Family Journeys (2015) OCLC 1028237338
- Life journeys : reclaiming life after loss (2016) OCLC 1088564902
- Under Pressure, Lake Mead Intake No. 3
- Circle of Life (editor)
- Local Control for Healthy Communities
- Portland's Big Pipe (East Side Big Pipe)
- Health Records
- The reluctant radical : civil disobedience to fight climate change (2019) OCLC 1158987532

=== Television ===
- Oregon Art Beat segments "Leslie Lee", "Glass Artist Tim Chilina", "Dennis Meiners" (producer)
