= Joyce Bay Sewage Treatment Facility =

Wastewater treatment plant in Port Moresby, Papua New Guinea

General information
- Type: wastewater treatment plant
- Location: Port Moresby, National Capital District, Papua New Guinea
- Coordinates: 9°29′59.0″S 147°11′31.8″E
- Groundbreaking: April 2016
- Inaugurated: 29 March 2019
- Cost: K236 million

Design and construction
- Main contractor: Kumul Consolidated Holdings

The Joyce Bay Sewage Treatment Facility is a wastewater treatment plant in Port Moresby, National Capital District, Papua New Guinea.

== History ==
The construction of the plant stated in April 2016. It was commissioned on 29 March 2019 by Public Enterprises and State Investments Minister William Duma and Ambassador of Japan to Papua New Guinea Satoshi Nakajima. The project was constructed as part of the Port Moresby Sewerage System Upgrade Project.

== Technical specifications ==
The plant has a daily water treatment capacity of 18.4 million liters. It consists of 13 pumping stations, 26 km sewerage network and 1.2 km marine outfall.

== Finance ==
The plant was constructed with a cost of K236 million. It was funded by Japanese International Cooperation Agency and the Government of Papua New Guinea.
