= Marine outfall =

Pipeline or tunnel that discharges wastewater

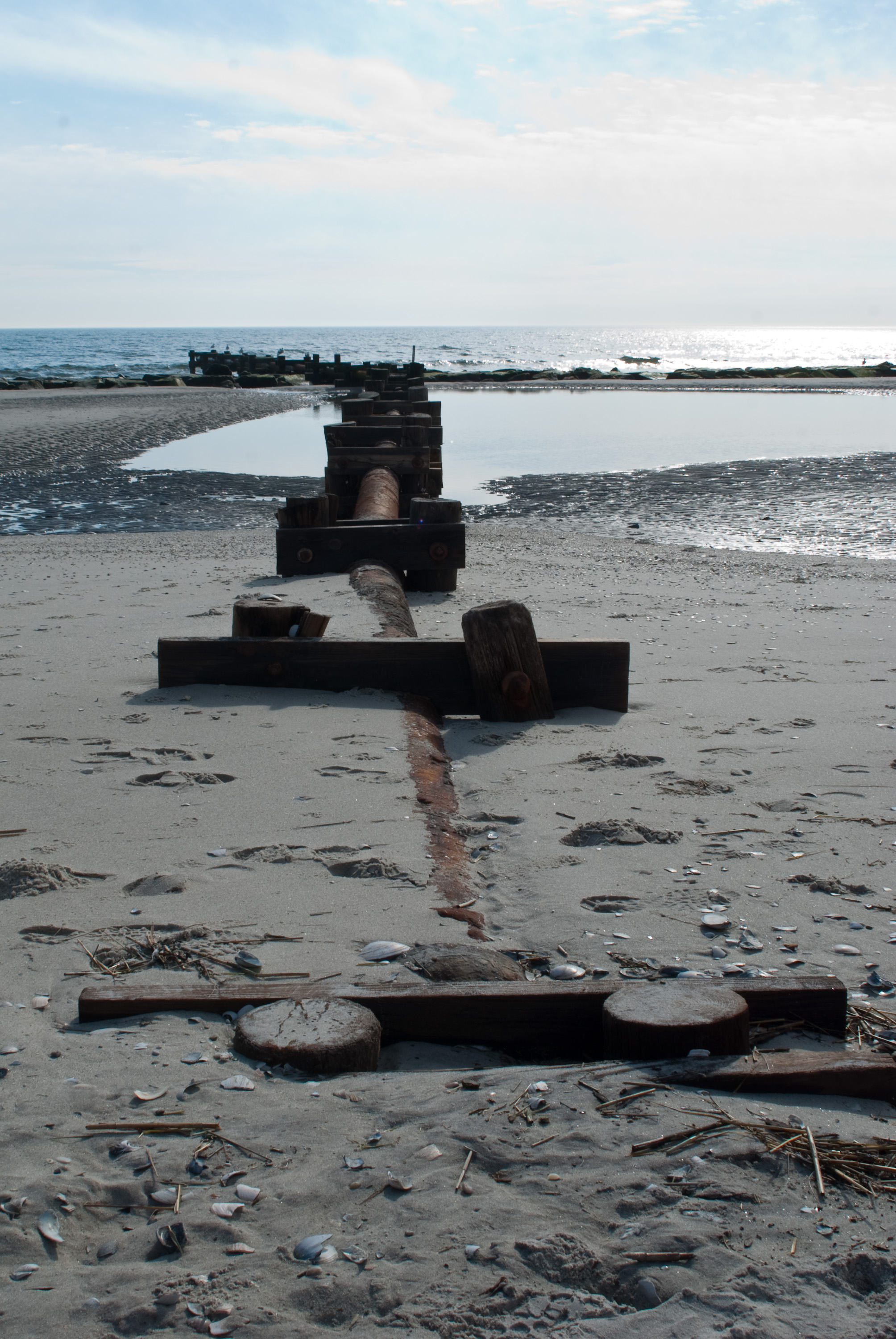
Ocean outfall pipes in Cape May, New Jersey, United States - buried pipes were exposed after the sand was removed by severe storm

A marine outfall (or ocean outfall) is a pipeline or tunnel that discharges municipal or industrial wastewater, stormwater, combined sewer overflows (CSOs), cooling water, or brine effluents from water desalination plants to the sea. Usually they discharge under the sea's surface (submarine outfall).

== Description ==
In the case of municipal wastewater, effluent is often discharged after having undergone no or only primary treatment, with the intention of using the assimilative capacity of the sea for further treatment. Submarine outfalls are common throughout the world and probably number in the thousands. The light intensity and salinity in natural sea water disinfect the wastewater to ocean outfall system significantly.

Outfalls vary in diameter from as narrow as 15 cm to as wide as 8 m; the widest registered outfall in the world has an 8 m diameter and is located in Navia (Spain) for the discharge of industrial wastewater. Outfalls vary in length from 50 m to 55 km; the longest registered outfalls are the Boston outfall with a length of 16 km and an industrial outfall in Ankleshwar (India) with a length of 55 km. The depth of the deepest point of an outfall varies from 3 m to 60 m, with the deepest registered outfall being located in Macuto, Vargas (Venezuela) for the discharge of untreated municipal wastewater.

Construction liner materials include polyethylene, stainless steel, carbon steel, glass-reinforced plastic, reinforced concrete, cast iron, or tunnels through bedrock. Common installation methods for pipelines are float and sink, bottom pull and top pull.

The world's longest marine outfall discharges from the Deer Island Waste Water Treatment Plant located in Boston, United States. Currently, Boston has approximately 235 miles of combined sewers and 37 active CSO outfalls. Many outfalls are simply known by a publicly used name, e.g. Boston Outfall.

== Advantages ==
The main advantages of marine outfalls for the discharge of wastewater are:

- the natural dilution and dispersion of organic matter, pathogens and other pollutants
- the ability to keep the sewage field submerged because of the depth at which the sewage is being released
- the greater die-off rate of pathogens due to the greater distance they will have to travel to shore.

They also tend to be less expensive than advanced wastewater treatment plants, using the natural assimilative capacity of the sea instead of energy-intensive treatment processes in a plant. For example, preliminary treatment of wastewater is sufficient with an effective outfall and diffuser. The costs of preliminary treatment are about one tenth that of secondary treatment. Preliminary treatment also requires much less land than advanced wastewater treatment.

== Disadvantages ==
Marine outfalls for partially treated or untreated wastewater remain controversial. The design calculation and computer models for pollution modeling have been criticized, arguing that dilution has been overemphasized and that other mechanisms work in the opposite direction, such as bioaccumulation of toxins, sedimentation of sludge particles and agglomeration of sewage particles with grease. Accumulative mechanisms include slick formation, windrow formation, flocculate formation and agglomerated formation. Grease or wax can interfere with dispersion, so that bacteria and viruses could be carried to remote locations where the concentration of bacterial predators would be low and the die-off rate much lower.

== Worldwide installations ==
More than 200 outfalls alone have been listed in a single international database maintained by the Institute for Hydromechanics at Karlsruhe University for the International Association of Hydraulic Engineering and Research (IAHR) / International Water Association (IWA) Committee on Marine Outfall Systems.

In Latin America and the Caribbean there were 134 outfalls with more than 500 m length in 2006 for wastewater disposal alone, according to a survey by the Pan American Center for Sanitary Engineering and Environmental Sciences (CEPIS) of PAHO. According to the survey, the largest number of municipal wastewater outfalls in the region exist in Venezuela (39), Chile (39) and Brazil (22).

Submarine outfalls exist, existed, or have been considered in the following locations, among many others:

Africa

- Casablanca (Morocco).
- Cape Town (South Africa).

Asia

- Manila Bay (Philippines).
- Mumbai (India).
- Mutwall (Sri Lanka).
- Wellawaththa (Sri Lanka).
- Lunawa (Sri Lanka).

Oceania

- Anglesea, Victoria.
- Geelong, Victoria.
- Sydney (e.g., Bondi Ocean Outfall Sewer)

Europe

- Barcelona, Spain
- Costa do Estoril (Portugal)
- Marmara Sea near Istanbul (Turkey)
- San Sebastián (Spain)
- Split (Croatia)
- Thames Estuary downstream of London (UK)
- Edinburgh, Scotland.

North America

- Honolulu (US)
- New York Bight (US)
- Southern California Bight (US). and
- Victoria, British Columbia, (Canada).
- Santa Monica, United States (world's first)
- Boston, United States (world's largest)
- The city of San Diego used Pacific Ocean dilution of primary treated effluent into the 21st century.

Latin America and the Caribbean

- Cartagena, Colombia
- Ipanema Beach beach from Rio de Janeiro (Brazil)
- Sosua (Dominican Republic).

== History ==
The world's first marine outfall was built in Santa Monica, United States, in 1910.

== Controversies ==
In the 1960s the city of Sydney decided to build ocean sewage outfalls to discharge partially treated sewage 2–4 km offshore at a cost of US$300 million. In the late 1980s, however, the government promised to upgrade the coastal treatment plants so that sewage would be treated to at least secondary treatment standards before discharge into the ocean.

Despite these promises, as of 2024, Sydney's major outfalls at Bondi and Malabar were still providing only primary treatment before discharge. In October 2024, the problems with this approach became evident when thousands of tennis ball-sized "grime balls" washed ashore on Sydney beaches, forcing their closure. Scientific analysis revealed these spheres contained a mixture of cooking oil, soap scum, fecal matter, and various contaminants. An investigation by New South Wales environmental authorities determined that Sydney Water's aging sewerage network and its ocean outfalls were the likely source, with the debris matching samples from the treatment facilities that discharge sewage effluent offshore after only primary treatment. This incident demonstrated how fats, oils, and greases in wastewater systems can agglomerate into pollution that impacts coastal areas despite offshore discharge, renewing calls for the long-promised secondary treatment upgrades.

The submarine outfall in Cartagena, Colombia was financed with a loan by the World Bank. It was subsequently challenged by residents claiming that the wastewater caused damage to the marine environment and to fisheries. The case was taken up by the World Bank's Inspection Panel, which contracted two independent three-dimensional modeling efforts in 2006. Both "confirmed that the 2.85km long submarine outfall (was) adequate."

For disposal into the ocean, environmental treaty requirements have to be met. As international treaties often manage water over countries' borders, wastewater disposal is easier in bodies of water found entirely under the jurisdiction of one country.
