= Sewage =

Wastewater that is produced by a community of people

Sewage (or domestic sewage, domestic wastewater, municipal wastewater) is a type of wastewater that is produced by a community of people. It is typically transported through a sewer system. Sewage consists of wastewater discharged from residences and from commercial, institutional and public facilities that exist in the locality. Sub-types of sewage are greywater (from sinks, bathtubs, showers, dishwashers, and clothes washers) and blackwater (the water used to flush toilets, combined with the human waste that it flushes away). Sewage also contains soaps and detergents. Food waste may be present from dishwashing, and food quantities may be increased where garbage disposal units are used. In regions where toilet paper is used rather than bidets, that paper is also added to the sewage. Sewage contains macro-pollutants and micro-pollutants, and may also incorporate some municipal solid waste and pollutants from industrial wastewater.

Sewage usually travels from a building's plumbing either into a sewer, which will carry it elsewhere, or into an onsite sewage facility. Collection of sewage from several households together usually takes places in either sanitary sewers or combined sewers. The former is designed to exclude stormwater flows whereas the latter is designed to also take stormwater. The production of sewage generally corresponds to the water consumption. A range of factors influence water consumption and hence the sewage flowrates per person. These include: Water availability (the opposite of water scarcity), water supply options, climate (warmer climates may lead to greater water consumption), community size, economic level of the community, level of industrialization, metering of household consumption, water cost and water pressure.

The main parameters in sewage that are measured to assess the sewage strength or quality as well as treatment options include: solids, indicators of organic matter, nitrogen, phosphorus, and indicators of fecal contamination. These can be considered to be the main macro-pollutants in sewage. Sewage contains pathogens which stem from fecal matter. The following four types of pathogens are found in sewage: pathogenic bacteria, viruses, protozoa (in the form of cysts or oocysts) and helminths (in the form of eggs). In order to quantify the organic matter, indirect methods are commonly used: mainly the Biochemical Oxygen Demand (BOD) and the Chemical Oxygen Demand (COD).

Management of sewage includes collection and transport for release into the environment, after a treatment level that is compatible with the local requirements for discharge into water bodies, onto soil or for reuse applications. Disposal options include dilution (self-purification of water bodies, making use of their assimilative capacity if possible), marine outfalls, land disposal and sewage farms. All disposal options may run risks of causing water pollution.

== Terminology ==
=== Sewage and wastewater ===
Sewage (or domestic wastewater) consists of wastewater discharged from residences and from commercial, institutional and public facilities that exist in the locality. Sewage is a mixture of water (from the community's water supply), human excreta (feces and urine), used water from bathrooms, food preparation wastes, laundry wastewater, and other waste products of normal living.

Sewage from municipalities contains wastewater from commercial activities and institutions, e.g. wastewater discharged from restaurants, laundries, hospitals, schools, prisons, offices, stores and establishments serving the local area of larger communities.

Sewage can be distinguished into "untreated sewage" (also called "raw sewage") and "treated sewage" (also called "effluent" from a sewage treatment plant).

The term "sewage" is nowadays often used interchangeably with "wastewater" – implying "municipal wastewater" – in many textbooks, policy documents and the literature. To be precise, wastewater is a broader term, because it refers to any water after it has been used in a variety of applications. Thus it may also refer to "industrial wastewater", agricultural wastewater and other flows that are not related to household activities.

=== Blackwater ===
Blackwater is wastewater containing human waste (feces and urine). As such, it contains large amounts of pathogens that may spread by the fecal–oral route. Blackwater is distinguished from greywater (which comes from sinks, baths, washing machines, and other household appliances apart from toilets). Greywater results from washing food, clothing, dishes, as well as from showering or bathing.

Blackwater and greywater are kept separate in "ecological buildings", such as autonomous buildings. Recreational vehicles often have separate holding tanks for greywater from showers and sinks, and blackwater from the toilet.

=== Greywater ===
Greywater or sullage (also spelled graywater in the United States and sometimes written as two words: grey water, gray water) is domestic wastewater generated in households or office buildings from streams without substantial fecal contamination, i.e. all streams except for the wastewater from toilets. Sources of greywater include sinks, showers, baths, washing machines or dishwashers. As greywater contains fewer pathogens than blackwater, it is generally safer to handle and easier to treat and reuse onsite for toilet flushing, landscape or crop irrigation, and other non-potable uses. Greywater may still have some pathogen content from laundering soiled clothing or cleaning the anal area in the shower or bath.

The application of greywater reuse in urban water systems provides substantial benefits for both the water supply subsystem, by reducing the demand for fresh clean water, and the wastewater subsystems by reducing the amount of conveyed and treated wastewater. Treated greywater has many uses, such as toilet flushing or irrigation.

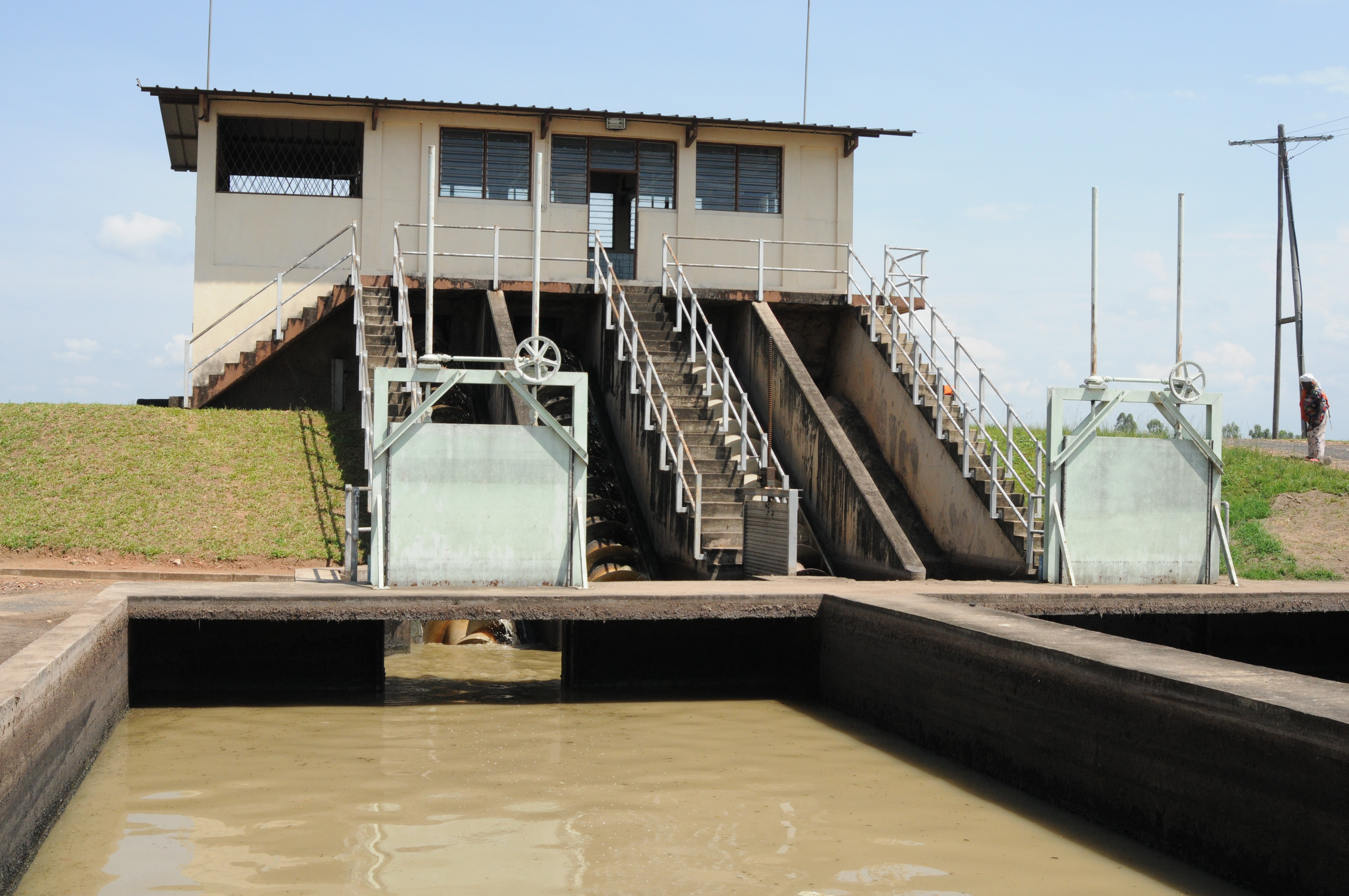
Pumping station lifting sewage to the treatment plant in Bujumbura, Burundi

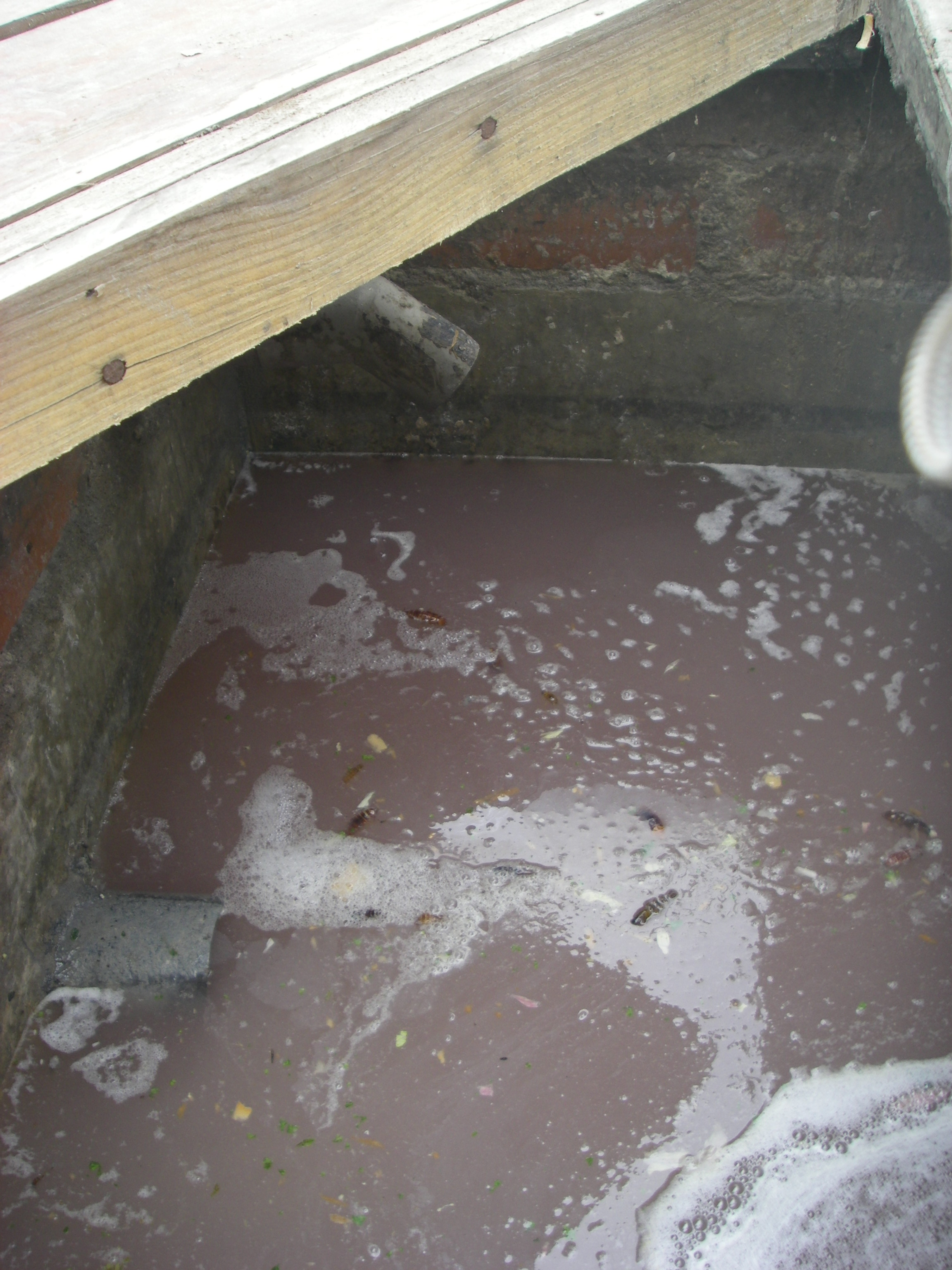
Greywater (a component of sewage) in a settling tank

== Overall appearance ==
The overall appearance of sewage is as follows: The temperature tends to be slightly higher than in drinking water but is more stable than the ambient temperature. The color of fresh sewage is slightly grey, whereas older sewage (also called "septic sewage") is dark grey or black. The odor of fresh sewage is "oily" and relatively unpleasant, whereas older sewage has an unpleasant foul odor due to hydrogen sulfide gas and other decomposition by-products. Sewage can have high turbidity from suspended solids.

The pH value of sewage is usually near neutral, and can be in the range of 6.7–8.0.

== Pollutants ==
Sewage consists primarily of water and usually contains less than one part of solid matter per thousand parts of water. In other words, one can say that sewage is composed of around 99.9% pure water, and the remaining 0.1% are solids, which can be in the form of either dissolved solids or suspended solids. The thousand-to-one ratio is an order of magnitude estimate rather than an exact percentage because, aside from variation caused by dilution, solids may be defined differently depending upon the mechanism used to separate those solids from the liquid fraction. Sludges of settleable solids removed by settling or suspended solids removed by filtration may contain significant amounts of entrained water, while dried solid material remaining after evaporation eliminates most of that water but includes dissolved minerals not captured by filtration or gravitational separation. The suspended and dissolved solids include organic and inorganic matter plus microorganisms.

About one-third of this solid matter is suspended by turbulence, while the remainder is dissolved or colloidal. For the situation in the United States in the 1950s it was estimated that the waste contained in domestic sewage is about half organic and half inorganic.

=== Organic matter ===
The organic matter in sewage can be classified in terms of form and size: Suspended (particulate) or dissolved (soluble). Secondly, it can be classified in terms of biodegradability: either inert or biodegradable. The organic matter in sewage consists of protein compounds (about 40%), carbohydrates (about 25–50%), oils and grease (about 10%) and urea, surfactants, phenols, pesticides and others (lower quantity). In order to quantify the organic matter content, it is common to use "indirect methods" which are based on the consumption of oxygen to oxidize the organic matter: mainly the Biochemical Oxygen Demand (BOD) and the Chemical Oxygen Demand (COD). These indirect methods are associated with the major impact of the discharge of organic matter into water bodies: the organic matter will be food for microorganisms, whose population will grow, and lead to the consumption of oxygen, which may then affect aquatic living organisms.

The mass load of organic content is calculated as the sewage flowrate multiplied with the concentration of the organic matter in the sewage.

Typical values for physical–chemical characteristics of raw sewage is provided further down below.

=== Nutrients ===
Apart from organic matter, sewage also contains nutrients. The major nutrients of interest are nitrogen and phosphorus. If sewage is discharged untreated, its nitrogen and phosphorus content can lead to pollution of lakes and reservoirs via a process called eutrophication.

In raw sewage, nitrogen exists in the two forms of organic nitrogen or ammonia. The ammonia stems from the urea in urine. Urea is rapidly hydrolyzed and therefore not usually found in raw sewage.

Total phosphorus is mostly present in sewage in the form of phosphates.They are either inorganic (polyphosphates and orthophosphates) and their main source is from detergents and other household chemical products. The other form is organic phosphorus, where the source is organic compounds to which the organic phosphorus is bound.

=== Pathogens ===
Human feces in sewage may contain pathogens capable of transmitting diseases. The following four types of pathogens are found in sewage:

- Bacteria like Salmonella, Shigella, Campylobacter, or Vibrio cholerae;
- Viruses like hepatitis A, rotavirus, coronavirus, enteroviruses;
- Protozoa like Entamoeba histolytica, Giardia lamblia, Cryptosporidium parvum; and
- Helminths and their eggs including Ascaris (roundworm), Ancylostoma (hookworm), and Trichuris (whipworm)

In most practical cases, pathogenic organisms are not directly investigated in laboratory analyses. An easier way to assess the presence of fecal contamination is by assessing the most probable numbers of fecal coliforms (called thermotolerant coliforms), especially Escherichia coli. Escherichia coli are intestinal bacteria excreted by all warm blooded animals, including human beings, and thus tracking their presence in sewage is easy, because of their substantially high concentrations (around 10 to 100 million per 100 mL).

=== Solid waste ===
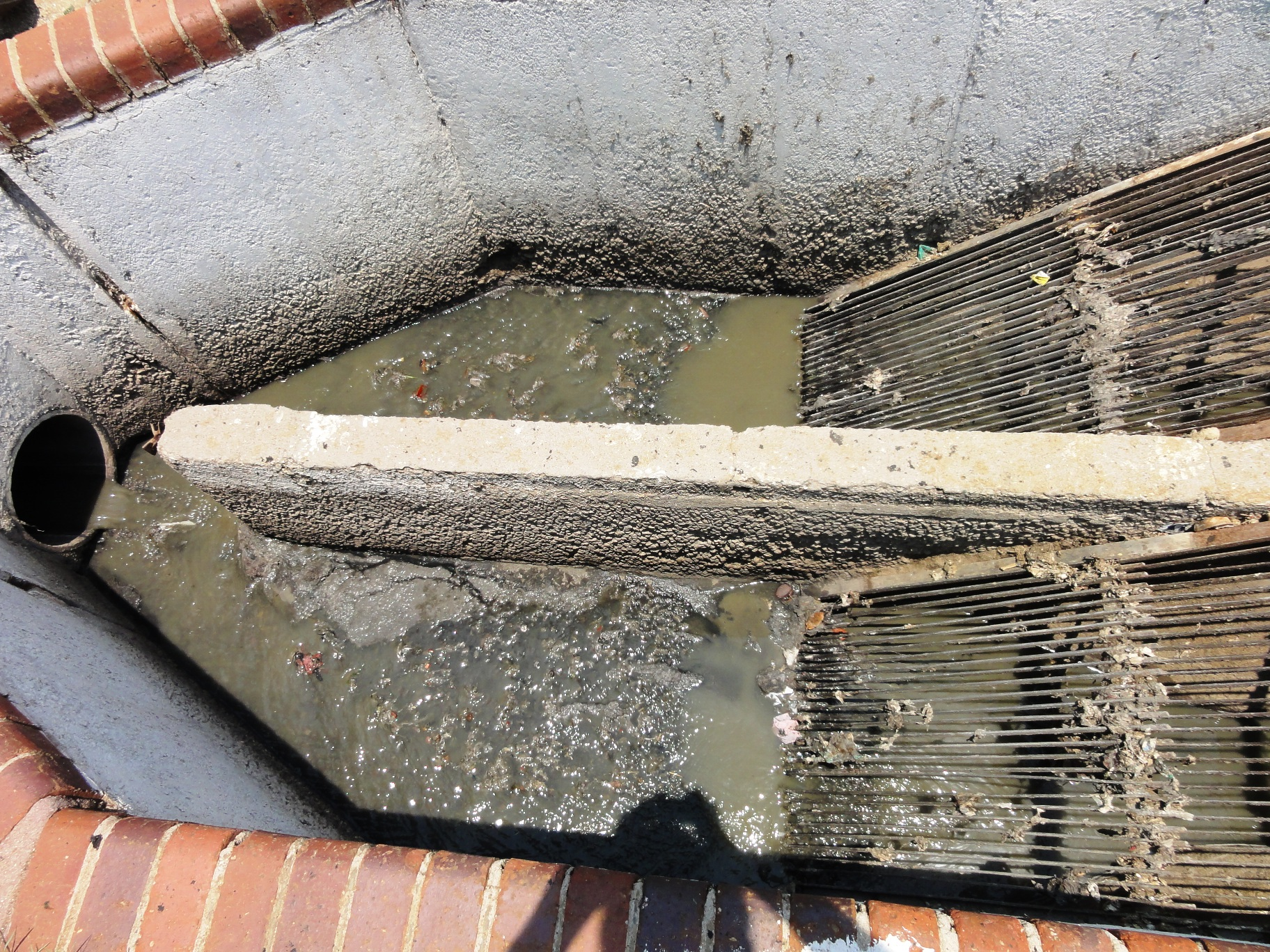
Screening of the sewage with bar screens at a sewage treatment plant to remove larger objects in Norton, Zimbabwe

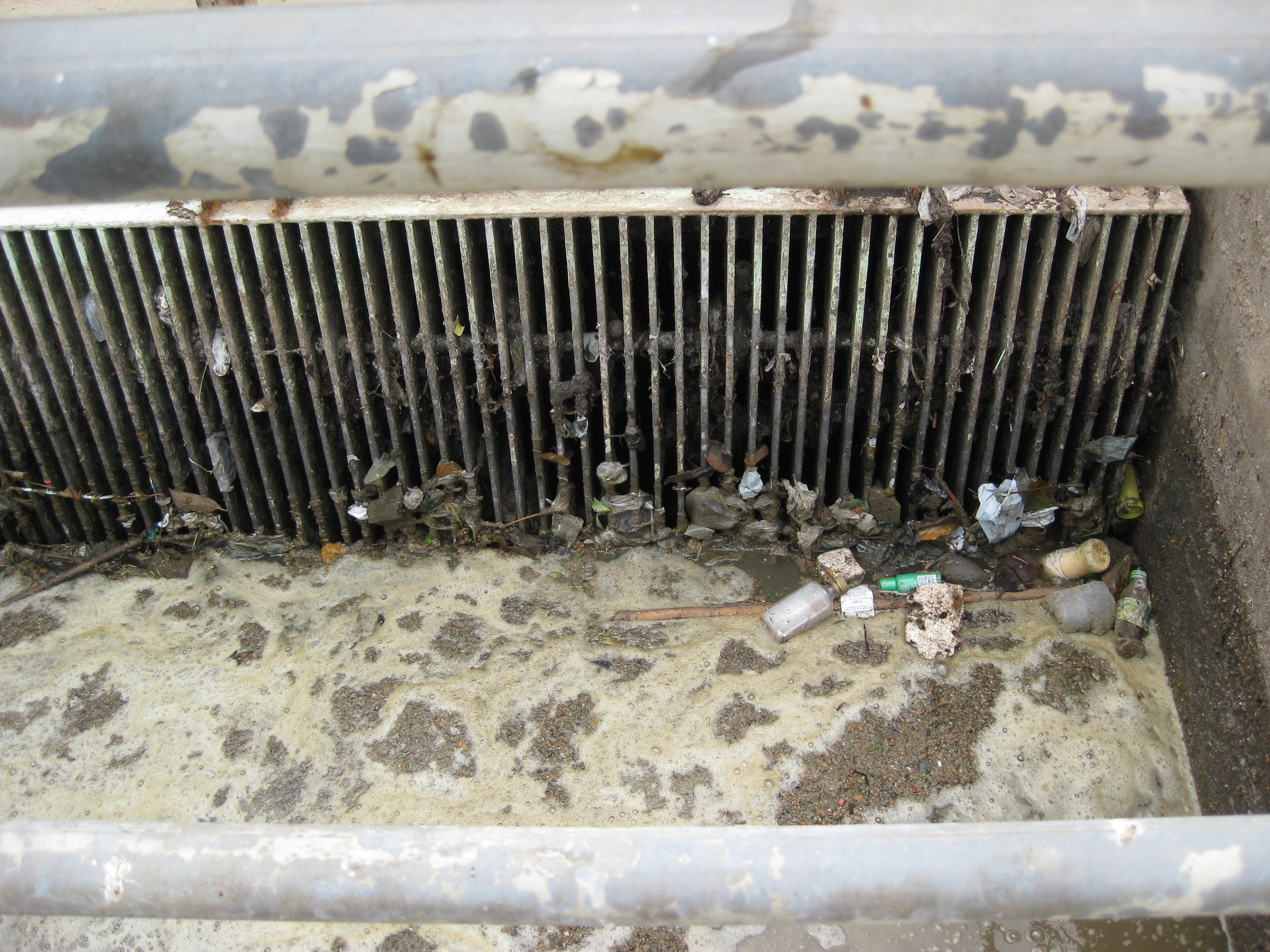
Screening of sewage at a sewage treatment plant in Bujumbura, Burundi

The ability of a flush toilet to make things "disappear" is soon recognized by young children who may experiment with virtually anything they can carry to the toilet. Adults may be tempted to dispose of toilet paper, wet wipes, diapers, sanitary napkins, tampons, tampon applicators, condoms, and expired medications, even at the risk of causing blockages. The privacy of a toilet offers a clandestine means of removing embarrassing evidence by flushing such things as drug paraphernalia, pregnancy test kits, combined oral contraceptive pill dispensers, and the packaging for those devices. There may be reluctance to retrieve items like children's toys or toothbrushes which accidentally fall into toilets, and items of clothing may be found in sewage from prisons or other locations where occupants may be careless. Trash and garbage in streets may be carried to combined sewers by stormwater runoff.

=== Micro-pollutants ===
Sewage contains environmental persistent pharmaceutical pollutants. Trihalomethanes can also be present as a result of past disinfection. Sewage may contain microplastics such as polyethylene and polypropylene beads, or polyester and polyamide fragments from synthetic clothing and bedding fabrics abraded by wear and laundering, or from plastic packaging and plastic-coated paper products disintegrated by lift station pumps. Pharmaceuticals, endocrine disrupting compounds, and hormones may be excreted in urine or feces if not catabolized within the human body.

Some residential users tend to pour unwanted liquids like used cooking oil, lubricants, adhesives, paint, solvents, detergents, and disinfectants into their sewer connections. This behavior can result in problems for the treatment plant operation and is thus discouraged.

== Typical sewage composition ==
=== Factors that determine composition ===
The composition of sewage varies with climate, social and economic situation and population habits. In regions where water use is low, the strength of the sewage (or pollutant concentrations) is much higher than that in the United States where water use per person is high. Household income and diet also plays a role: For example, for the case of Brazil, it has been found that the higher the household income, the higher is the BOD load per person and the lower is the BOD concentration.

=== Concentrations and loads ===
Typical values for physical–chemical characteristics of raw sewage in developing countries have been published as follows: 180 g/person/d for total solids (or 1100 mg/L when expressed as a concentration), 50 g/person/d for BOD (300 mg/L), 100 g/person/d for COD (600 mg/L), 8 g/person/d for total nitrogen (45 mg/L), 4.5 g/person/d for ammonia-N (25 mg/L) and 1.0 g/person/d for total phosphorus (7 mg/L). The typical ranges for these values are: 120–220 g/person/d for total solids (or 700–1350 mg/L when expressed as a concentration), 40–60 g/person/d for BOD (250–400 mg/L), 80–120 g/person/d for COD (450–800 mg/L), 6–10 g/person/d for total nitrogen (35–60 mg/L), 3.5–6 g/person/d for ammonia-N (20–35 mg/L) and 0.7–2.5 g/person/d for total phosphorus (4–15 mg/L).

For high income countries, the "per person organic matter load" has been found to be approximately 60 gram of BOD per person per day. This is called the population equivalent (PE) and is also used as a comparison parameter to express the strength of industrial wastewater compared to sewage.

Values for households in the United States have been published as follows, whereby the estimates are based on the assumption that 25% of the homes have kitchen waste-food grinders (sewage from such households contain more waste): 95 g/person/d for total suspended solids (503 mg/L concentration), 85 g/person/d for BOD (450 mg/L), 198 g/person/d for COD (1050 mg/L), 13.3 g/person/d for the sum of organic nitrogen and ammonia nitrogen (70.4 mg/L), 7.8 g/person/d for ammonia-N (41.2 mg/L) and 3.28 g/person/d for total phosphorus (17.3 mg/L). The concentration values given here are based on a flowrate of 190 L per person per day.

A United States source published in 1972 estimated that the daily dry weight of solid wastes per capita in sewage is estimated as 20.5 g (0.72 oz) in feces, 43.3 g (1.53 oz) of dissolved solids in urine, 20 g (0.71 oz) of toilet paper, 86.5 g (3.05 oz) of greywater solids, 30 g (1.1 oz) of food solids (if garbage disposal units are used), and varying amounts of dissolved minerals depending upon salinity of local water supplies, volume of water use per capita, and extent of water softener use.

Sewage contains urine and feces. The mass of feces varies with dietary fiber intake. An average person produces 128 grams of wet feces per day, or a median dry mass of 29 g/person/day. The median urine generation rate is about 1.42 L/person/day, as was determined by a global literature review.

== Flowrates ==
The volume of domestic sewage produced per person (or "per capita", abbreviated as "cap") varies with the water consumption in the respective locality. A range of factors influence water consumption and hence the sewage flowrates per person. These include: Water availability (the opposite of water scarcity), water supply options, climate (warmer climates may lead to greater water consumption), community size, economic level of the community, level of industrialization, metering of household consumption, water cost and water pressure.

The production of sewage generally corresponds to the water consumption. However water used for landscape irrigation will not enter the sewer system, while groundwater and stormwater may enter the sewer system in addition to sewage. There are usually two peak flowrates of sewage arriving at a treatment plant per day: One peak is at the beginning of the morning and another peak is at the beginning of the evening.

With regards to water consumption, a design figure that can be regarded as "world average" is 35–90 L (9.2–23.8 US gal) per person per day (data from 1992). The same publication listed the water consumption in China as 80 L (21 US gal) per person per day, Africa as 15–35 L (4.0–9.2 US gal) per person per day, Eastern Mediterranean in Europe as 40–85 L (11–22 US gal) per person per day and Latin America and Caribbean as 70–190 L (18–50 US gal) per person per day. Even inside a country, there may be large variations from one region to another due to the various factors that determine the water consumption as listed above.

A flowrate value of 200 L (53 US gal) of sewage per person per day is often used as an estimate in high income countries, and is used for example in the design of sewage treatment plants.

For comparison, typical sewage flowrates from urban residential sources in the United States are estimated based on the number of people in the as follows:

- One person households: 365 L (96 US gal) per person per day,
- Two person households: 288 L (76 US gal) per person per day,
- Four person households: 200 L (53 US gal) per person per day,
- Six person households: 189 L (50 US gal) per person per day.

The overall range for these estimates are 189–365 L (50–96 US gal) per person per day.

== Analytical methods ==
=== General quality indicators ===
Wastewater quality indicators are laboratory test methodologies to assess suitability of wastewater for disposal, treatment or reuse. The main parameters in sewage that are measured to assess the sewage strength or quality as well as treatment options include: solids, indicators of organic matter, nitrogen, phosphorus, indicators of fecal contamination. Tests selected vary with the intended use or discharge location. Tests can measure physical, chemical, and biological characteristics of the wastewater. Physical characteristics include temperature and solids. Chemical characteristics include pH value, dissolved oxygen concentrations, biochemical oxygen demand (BOD) and chemical oxygen demand (COD), nitrogen, phosphorus, chlorine. Biological characteristics are determined with bioassays and aquatic toxicology tests.

=== Specific organisms and substances ===
Sewage can be monitored for both disease-causing and benign organisms with a variety of techniques. Traditional techniques involve filtering, staining, and examining samples under a microscope. Much more sensitive and specific testing can be accomplished with DNA sequencing, such as when looking for rare organisms, attempting eradication, testing specifically for drug-resistant strains, or discovering new species. Sequencing DNA from an environmental sample is known as metagenomics.

Sewage has also been analyzed to determine relative rates of use of prescription and illegal drugs among municipal populations. General socioeconomic demographics may be inferred as well.

== Collection ==
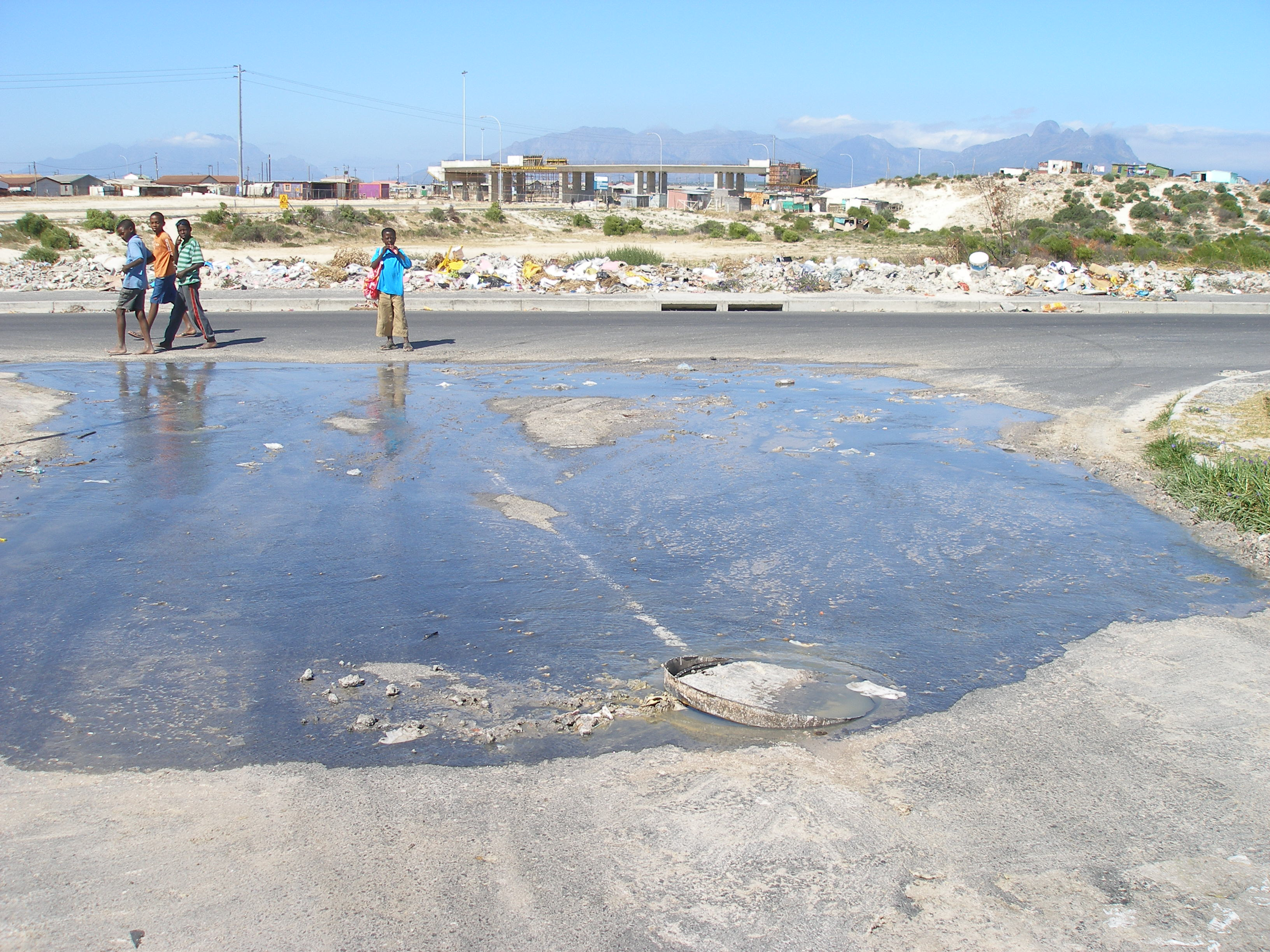
Lack of maintenance causing sewage to overflow from a manhole into the street of an informal settlement near Cape Town, South Africa

Sewage is commonly collected and transported in gravity sewers, either in a sanitary sewer or in a combined sewer. The latter also conveys urban runoff (stormwater) which means the sewage gets diluted during rain events.

=== Sanitary sewer ===
A sanitary sewer is an underground pipe or tunnel system for transporting sewage from houses and commercial buildings (but not stormwater) to a sewage treatment plant or disposal.

=== Combined sewer ===
A combined sewer is a type of gravity sewer with a system of pipes, tunnels, pump stations etc. to transport sewage and urban runoff together to a sewage treatment plant or disposal site. This means that during rain events, the sewage gets diluted, resulting in higher flowrates at the treatment site. Uncontaminated stormwater simply dilutes sewage, but runoff may dissolve or suspend virtually anything it contacts on roofs, streets, and storage yards. As rainfall travels over roofs and the ground, it may pick up various contaminants including soil particles and other sediment, heavy metals, organic compounds, animal waste, and oil and grease. Combined sewers may also receive dry weather drainage from landscape irrigation, construction dewatering, and washing buildings and sidewalks.

== Dilution in the sewer ==
=== Infiltration of groundwater into the sewerage system ===
Infiltration is groundwater entering sewer pipes through defective pipes, connections, joints or manholes. Contaminated or saline groundwater may introduce additional pollutants to the sewage. The amount of such infiltrated water depends on several parameters, such as the length of the collection network, pipeline diameters, drainage area, soil type, water table depth, topography and number of connections per unit area. Infiltration is increased by poor construction procedures, and tends to increase with the age of the sewer. The amount of infiltration varies with the depth of the sewer in comparison to the local groundwater table. Older sewer systems that are in need of rehabilitation may also exfiltrate sewage into groundwater from the leaking sewer joints and service connections. This can lead to groundwater pollution.

=== Stormwater ===
Combined sewers are designed to transport sewage and stormwater together. This means that sewage becomes diluted during rain events. There are other types of inflow that also dilute sewage, e.g. "water discharged from cellar and foundation drains, cooling-water discharges, and any direct stormwater runoff connections to the sanitary collection system". The "direct inflows" can result in peak sewage flowrates similar to combined sewers during wet weather events.

=== Industrial wastewater ===
Sewage from communities with industrial facilities may include some industrial wastewater, generated by industrial processes such as the production or manufacture of goods. Volumes of industrial wastewater vary widely with the type of industry. Industrial wastewater may contain very different pollutants at much higher concentrations than what is typically found in sewage. Pollutants may be toxic or non-biodegradable waste including pharmaceuticals, biocides, heavy metals, radionuclides, or thermal pollution.

An industry may treat its wastewater and discharge it into the environment (or even use the treated wastewater for specific applications), or, in case it is located in the urban area, it may discharge the wastewater into the public sewerage system. In the latter case, industrial wastewater may receive pre-treatment at the factories to reduce the pollutant load. Mixing industrial wastewater with sewage does nothing to reduce the mass of pollutants to be treated, but the volume of sewage lowers the concentration of pollutants unique to industrial wastewater, and the volume of industrial wastewater lowers the concentration of pollutants unique to sewage.

== Disposal and dilution ==
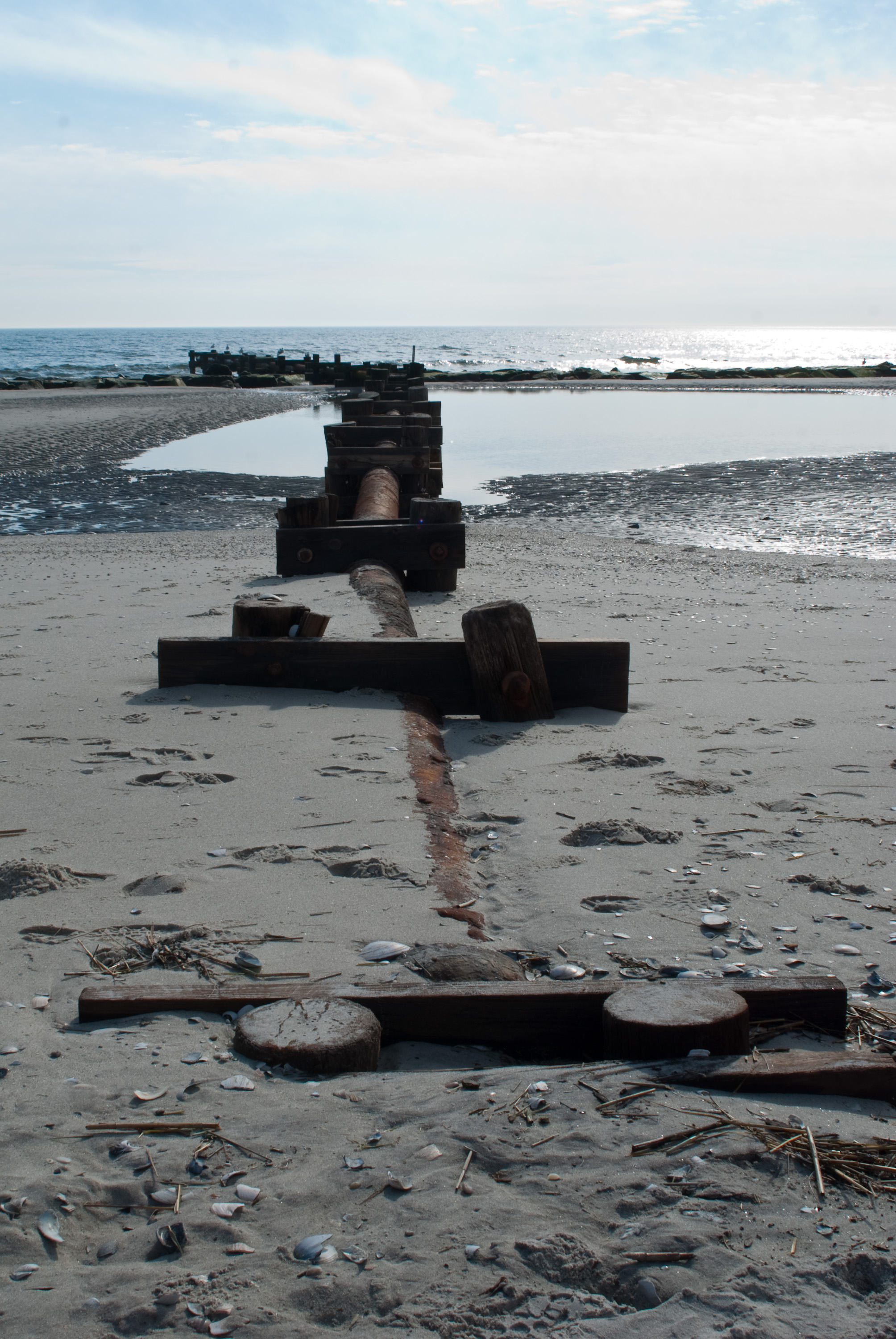
Ocean outfall pipes in Cape May, New Jersey, United States – pipes exposed after the sand was removed by severe storm

=== Assimilative capacity of receiving water bodies or land ===
When wastewater is discharged into a water body (river, lakes, sea) or land, its relative impact will depend on the assimilative capacity of the water body or ecosystem. Water bodies have a self-purification capacity, so that the concentration of a pollutant may decrease along the distance from the discharge point. Furthermore, water bodies provide a dilution to the pollutants concentrations discharged, although it does not decrease their mass. In principle, the higher the dilution capacity (ratio of volume or flow of the receiving water and volume or flow of sewage discharged), the lower will be the concentration of pollutants in the receiving water, and probably the lower will be the negative impacts. But if the water body already arrives very polluted at the point of discharge, the dilution will be of limited value.

In several cases, a community may partially treat its sewage, and still count on the assimilative capacity of the water body. However, this needs to be analyzed very carefully, taking into account the quality of the water in the receiving body before it receives the discharge of sewage, the resulting water quality after the discharge and the impact on the intended water uses after discharge. There are also specific legal requirements in each country. Different countries have different regulations regarding the specifications of the quality of the sewage being discharged and the quality to be maintained in the receiving water body.The combination of treatment and disposal must comply with existing local regulations.

The assimilative capacity depends – among several factors – on the ability of the receiving water to sustain dissolved oxygen concentrations necessary to support organisms catabolizing organic waste. For example, fish may die if dissolved oxygen levels are depressed below 5 mg/L.

Application of sewage to land can be considered as a form of final disposal or of treatment, or both. Land disposal alternatives require consideration of land availability, groundwater quality, and possible soil deterioration.

=== Other disposal methods ===
Sewage may be discharged to an evaporation or infiltration basin. Groundwater recharge is used to reduce saltwater intrusion, or replenish aquifers used for agricultural irrigation. Treatment is usually required to sustain percolation capacity of infiltration basins, and more extensive treatment may be required for aquifers used as drinking water supplies.

==== Marine outfall ====
A marine outfall (or ocean outfall) is a pipeline or tunnel that discharges municipal or industrial wastewater, stormwater, combined sewer overflows (CSOs), cooling water, or brine effluents from water desalination plants to the sea. Usually they discharge under the sea's surface (submarine outfall).

=== Global situation ===
Before the 20th century in Europe, sewers usually discharged into a body of water such as a river, lake, or ocean. There was no treatment, so the breakdown of the human waste was left to the ecosystem. This could lead to satisfactory results if the assimilative capacity of the ecosystem is sufficient which is nowadays not often the case due to increasing population density.

Today, the situation in urban areas of industrialized countries is usually that sewers route their contents to a sewage treatment plant rather than directly to a body of water. In many developing countries, however, the bulk of municipal and industrial wastewater is discharged to rivers and the ocean without any treatment or after preliminary treatment or primary treatment only. Doing so can lead to water pollution. Few reliable figures exist on the share of the wastewater collected in sewers that is being treated worldwide. A global estimate by UNDP and UN-Habitat in 2010 was that 90% of all wastewater generated is released into the environment untreated. A more recent study in 2021 estimated that globally, about 52% of sewage is treated. However, sewage treatment rates are highly unequal for different countries around the world. For example, while high-income countries treat approximately 74% of their sewage, developing countries treat an average of just 4.2%. As of 2022, without sufficient treatment, more than 80% of all wastewater generated globally is released into the environment. High-income nations treat, on average, 70% of the wastewater they produce, according to UN Water. Only 8% of wastewater produced in low-income nations receives any sort of treatment.

== Treatment ==
Sewage treatment is beneficial in reducing environmental pollution. Bar screens can remove large solid debris from sewage, and primary treatment can remove floating and settleable matter. Primary treated sewage usually contains less than half of the original solids content and approximately two-thirds of the BOD in the form of colloids and dissolved organic compounds. Secondary treatment can reduce the BOD of organic waste in undiluted sewage, but is less effective for dilute sewage. Water disinfection may be attempted to kill pathogens prior to disposal, and is increasingly effective after more elements of the foregoing treatment sequence have been completed. Sewage is not a waste matter and the organic matter, during the sewage treatment process, can be recovered in the form of insects which can be used as ingredient in fish/poultry meal.

== Reuse and reclamation ==
An alternative to discharge into the environment is to reuse the sewage in a productive way (for agricultural, urban or industrial uses), in compliance with local regulations and requirements for each specific reuse application. Public health risks of sewage reuse in agriculture can be minimized by following a "multiple barrier approach" according to guidelines by the World Health Organization.

There is also the possibility of resource recovery which could make agriculture more sustainable by using carbon, nitrogen, phosphorus, water and energy recovered from sewage.

=== Sewage farm ===
Sewage farms use sewage for irrigation and fertilizing agricultural land. The practice is common in warm, arid climates where irrigation is valuable while sources of fresh water are scarce. Suspended solids may be converted to humus by microbes and bacteria in order to supply nitrogen, phosphorus and other plant nutrients for crop growth. Many industrialized nations use conventional sewage treatment plants nowadays instead of sewage farms. These reduce vector and odor problems; but sewage farming remains a low-cost option for some developing countries. Sewage farming should not be confused with sewage disposal through infiltration basins or subsurface drains.

== Regulations ==
Sewage management includes collection and transport for release into the environment after a treatment level that is compatible with the local requirements for discharge into water bodies, onto soil, or for reuse applications. In most countries, uncontrolled discharges of wastewater to the environment are not permitted under law, and strict water quality requirements are to be met. For requirements in the United States, see Clean Water Act.

Sewage management regulations are often part of a country's broader sanitation policies. These may also include the management of human excreta (from non-sewered collection systems), solid waste and stormwater.

== See also ==
- Fecal sludge management
- History of water supply and sanitation
- Leak
- Mold
- Reuse of human excreta
- Urban Waste Water Treatment Directive
- Wastewater-based epidemiology
