= Outfall =

Discharge point of a drain or waste stream into a body of water

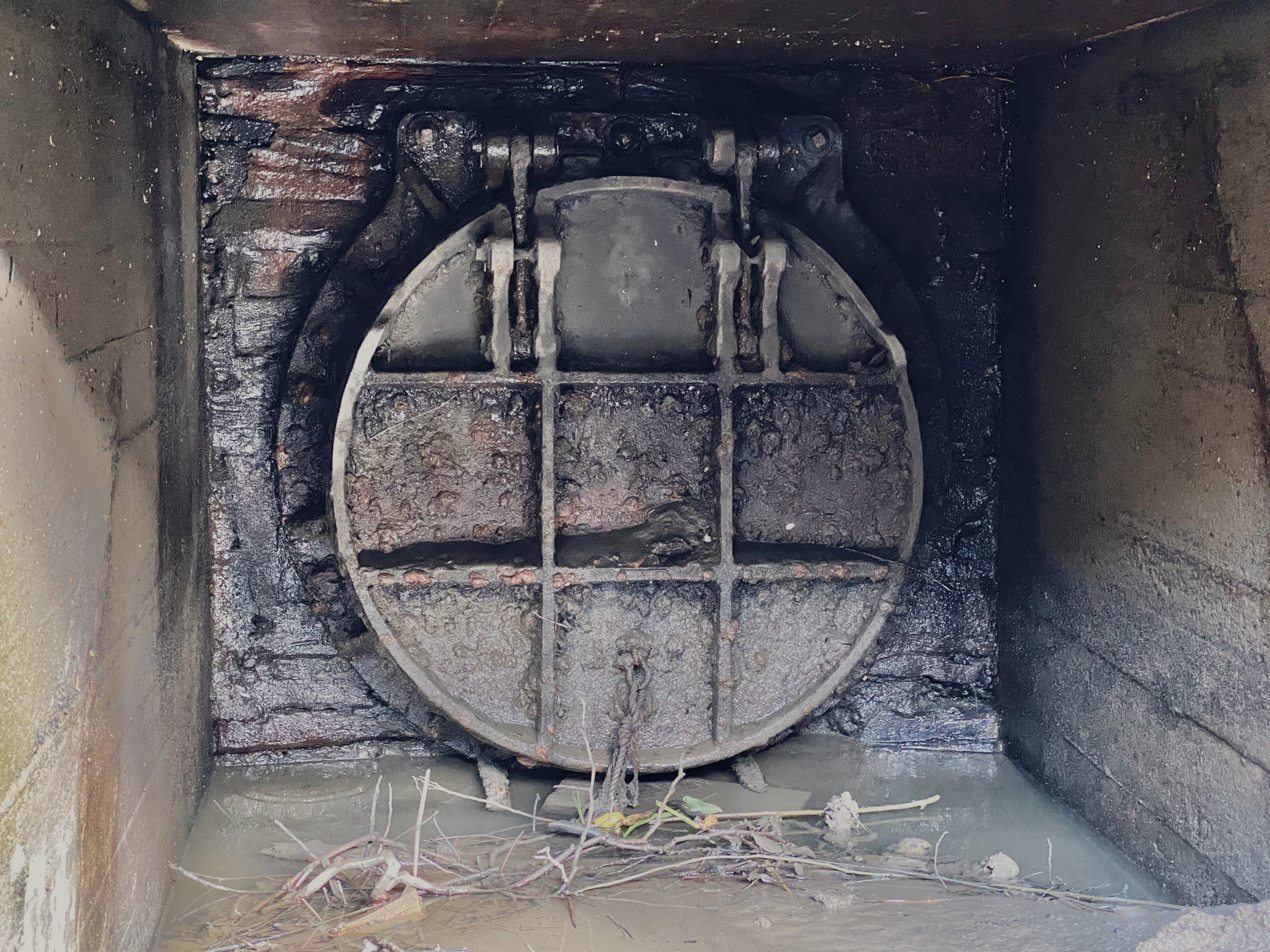
Outfall with a flap valve at River Thames in London

An outfall is the discharge point of a storm drain or waste stream into a body of water. In the United Kingdom, the term may also apply to discharges from a "watercourse", which may be a river, stream or canal.

== United States permit requirements ==
Outfall from a sewage plant discharging to Passaic River in New Jersey

In the United States, point sources may not discharge pollutants to surface waters without a permit issued through the National Pollutant Discharge Elimination System (NPDES), as required by the Clean Water Act. Most NPDES permits are issued by state environmental agencies. The U.S. Environmental Protection Agency (EPA) issues permits in some locations.

Point sources include industrial facilities; service industries; municipal governments (particularly sewage treatment plants and stormwater outfalls); other government facilities such as military bases; and some agricultural facilities, such as animal feedlots.

== See also ==
- Combined sewer
- Greywater
- Marine outfall
- Night soil
- River mouth
