= DigIndy =

Tunnel system project in the United States

DigIndy is a $2 billion tunnel system project in Indianapolis, Indiana, U.S., that was built to hold 250 million US gallons (950,000,000 L; 210,000,000 imp gal) of sewage after rain. The older portions of the city's sewer system is a combined sewer system, which allows for sewage and stormwater to flow through the same pipelines.

== Background ==
When Indianapolis built its first sewer system, it was not intended to be a combined water system. The original system only allowed for stormwater to run through it. Once indoor plumbing became prevalent, the decision to combine raw sewage into the stormwater system was made. Indianapolis began to increase in population and the rainfalls increased, this system became overwhelmed. Overflow events increased over the years, causing raw sewage to back up into homes and businesses, leading to an environmental problem. Some of these overflow events polluted the White River near the affluent northside neighborhoods of Meridian Hills and Broad Ripple. The residents of these neighborhoods complained and the city officials decided the solution was the Northside Sewer Diversion Project that would divert sewage from northern Indianapolis to the Mapleton-Fall Creek neighborhood and surrounding area.

=== Impacts and criticism ===
In 2001, the U.S. Environmental Protection Agency (EPA) began to look into the issues of the city sewer overflows after a complaint was filed by activist Leon Bates, other local residents and environmental organizations. The complaint caused the EPA to investigate the implications of the raw and untreated sewage being rerouted to Fall Creek's predominantly Black neighborhoods. The complaint filed was the first sewage complaint the EPA had ever accepted to be investigated. Congresswoman Julia Carson lobbied for the investigation to take place.

There was also a concerning concentration of E. coli and other bacteria. The first civil rights complaint was filed in 1999, and around 2001 the city started a $20 million project that would allow for more sewage to be treated by Belmont Street waste facility. This project's goal was to decrease the amount of waterflow into waterways. However, the complaint criticized the city of Indianapolis and the Stephen Goldsmith administration for prioritizing smaller sewage issues in the Pogues Run area, which had a significantly lower minority population than that of the polluted areas of Fall Creek. The EPA concluded that Indianapolis' efforts were not adequate for mitigating the ongoing environmental crisis the overflows were causing.

== Project ==
In response to the EPA's findings, Citizens Energy Group committed to a $2 billion Long Term Control Plan with the goal of reducing overflow events. The project, which began in 2011 and concluded by 2025, is known as DigIndy and is designed to store 250 million gallons of sewage over in tunnels 200 feet (61 m) under the ground to be released slowly into the Southport Advanced Wastewater Treatment Plant. This redirecting of sewage will keep the waste from entering Indianapolis waterways and eliminate overflow events. The system will also impact water systems from Indianapolis, all the way to the Gulf of Mexico. The tunnel system comprises six tunnels spanning a total of 28 miles (45 km).

In January 2026, Citizens Energy Group announced that the DigIndy Tunnel System was fully operational and in compliance with all federal and state regulations.

== See also ==
- Tunnel and Reservoir Plan
