= West Side CSO Tunnel =

Coordinates: 45.53643°N 122.68642°W

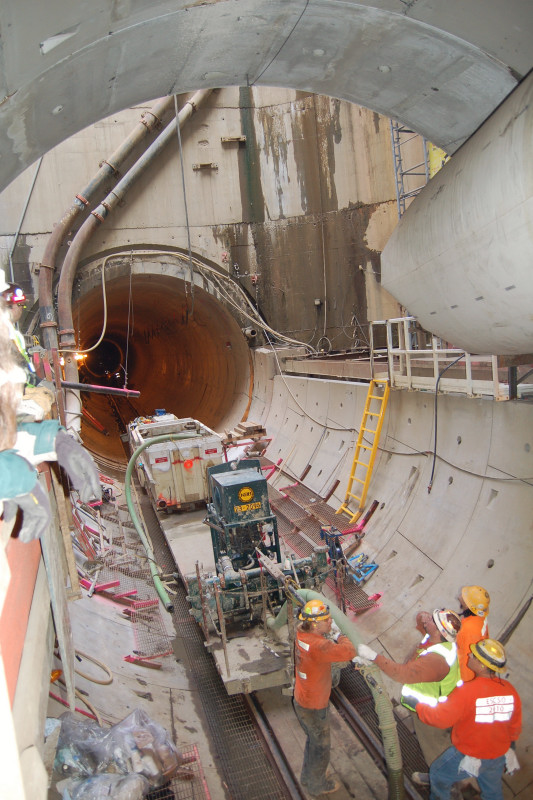
Eastside Big Pipe under construction

The West Side Combined Sewer Overflow Tunnel (also West Side Big Pipe) is a tunnel in Portland, Oregon, United States. It receives and stores overflow from the combined sewer system before it can reach the Willamette River. The main tunnel is 14 feet (4.3 m) in diameter and 3.5 miles (5.6 km) long for a capacity of 2,850,000 cubic feet (81,000 m^{3}) and connects to dozens of smaller sewer overflow interceptors along the west side of the Willamette River.

The tunnel receives flows that might otherwise reach the river. Instead, the CSO tunnel transports them to the Swan Island Pump Station. Portland's 1930s sewer design combined street and surface runoff with sewage in a common system that was overwhelmed during heavy precipitation. The original system handled overflows by sending excess flow into the river.

The tunnel is 120 to 160 feet (37 to 49 m) below ground level. It passes under the Willamette River between the NW Nicolai Street shaft () to the confluent vertical shaft on Swan Island (), which also receives the East Side Big Pipe. From Nicolai, it travels roughly south close to Front Avenue. There are vertical shafts at Upshur, Ankeny (), and Clay streets (). The Clay Street shaft receives the Southwest Parallel Interceptor, a 3-to-6-foot (0.91 to 1.83 m) pipeline which runs along the west Willamette shore for 3 miles (4.8 km) to Virginia Avenue and Taylors Ferry Road .

The project is a part of the Willamette River combined sewer overflow expansion program. Construction occurred from November 2002 to September 2006, and the project became fully operational in December 2006.

A 20-year series of related CSO projects, including the West Side Big Pipe, culminated in late 2011 with completion of the East Side Big Pipe. The combined projects reduced the city's sewer overflows into the Willamette River by 94 percent and into the Columbia Slough by more than 99 percent. The total cost of the projects, about $1.4 billion, was financed over time through additions to the Portland sewer rates. Almost no financial support for the projects came from state or Federal governments.

== See also ==
- List of crossings of the Willamette River
