= South Boston CSO Storage Tunnel =

The South Boston CSO Storage Tunnel, also known as the North Dorchester Bay CSO Storage Tunnel, is a large underground facility designed to reduce untreated sewage discharges into Boston Harbor from the Massachusetts Water Resources Authority combined sewer and stormwater system. It was opened on July 23, 2011, and is part of the federally mandated Boston Harbor Cleanup project. CSO stands for Combined Sewer Overflow.

The main part of the facility is a tunnel 17 feet (5.2 m) in diameter, running 2.5 miles (4.0 km) along the harbor front. The tunnel starts at an Odor Control Building (42.3225°N 71.0490°W), continues along the harbor front, with a midpoint near 42.3294°N 71.0373°W, and ends with a pump station at 42.3385°N 71.0216°W.

Combined sewers are problematic because during heavy storms, they are forced by a high volume of rainwater from storm drains to carry untreated sanitary sewer output into Boston harbor, including dangerous amounts of human waste. In addition to the tunnel project, the MWRA is undertaking costly sewer separation in parts of South Boston near the Reserved Channel, and reconfiguring various drains and outflows. The tunnel provides a buffer to allow some combined sewers to remain in service. It has sufficient buffer capacity to hold combined sewage and rain water during most storms, helping to eliminate the Combined Sewer Outflow events that polluted nearby beaches on average 20 times per year. After the storm is over, the tunnel is "dewatered" back into the network at a rate the Deer Island Waste Water Treatment Plant can handle.
