= Inside Iraq: The Untold Stories =

- Directed by: Mike Shiley
- Written by: Mike Shiley
- Edited by: Lindsey Goodwin-Grayzel; Wolfie Pfrommer; Rick Ray
- Music by: Thomas Schroyer
- Release date: 2004
- Running time: 84 minutes

Inside Iraq: The Untold Stories (2004) is an Iraq War documentary film directed and written by Mike Shiley.

== Cast ==
- Mike Shiley

== Production ==
Mike Shiley wrote and directed the documentary. Sharon Okonek was the executive producer and Page Ostrow and Rick Ray were the executive producers. The music of the film was composed by Thomas Schroyer. Editing was done by Lindsey Goodwin-Grayzel, Wolfie Pfrommer, and Rick Ray.
