= Concentration =

Ratio of part of a mixture to the whole

In chemistry, concentration is the abundance of a constituent divided by the total volume of a mixture. Several types of mathematical description can be distinguished: mass concentration, molar concentration, number concentration, and volume concentration. The concentration can refer to any kind of chemical mixture, but most frequently refers to solutes and solvents in solutions. The molar (amount) concentration has variants, such as normal concentration and osmotic concentration. Dilution is reduction of concentration, e.g., by adding solvent to a solution. The verb "to concentrate" means to increase concentration, the opposite of dilute.

== Etymology ==
Concentration-, concentratio, action or an act of coming together at a house on a farm in a single place, was used in post-classical Latin in 1550 or earlier, similar terms attested in Italian (1589), Spanish (1589), English (1606), French (1632).

== Qualitative description ==
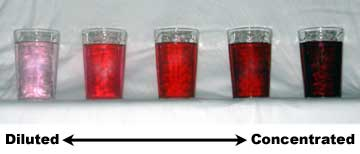
These glasses containing red dye demonstrate qualitative changes in concentration. The solutions on the left are more dilute, compared to the more concentrated solutions on the right.

Often in informal, non-technical language, concentration is described in a qualitative way, through the use of adjectives such as "dilute" for solutions of relatively low concentration and "concentrated" for solutions of relatively high concentration. To concentrate a solution, one must add more solute (for example, alcohol), or reduce the amount of solvent (for example, water). By contrast, to dilute a solution, one must add more solvent, or reduce the amount of solute. Unless two substances are miscible, there exists a concentration at which no further solute will dissolve in a solution. At this point, the solution is said to be saturated. If additional solute is added to a saturated solution, it will not dissolve, except in certain circumstances, when supersaturation may occur. Instead, phase separation will occur, leading to coexisting phases, either completely separated or mixed as a suspension. The point of saturation depends on many variables, such as ambient temperature and the precise chemical nature of the solvent and solute.

Concentrations are often called levels, reflecting the mental schema of levels on the vertical axis of a graph, which can be high or low (for example, "high serum levels of bilirubin" are concentrations of bilirubin in the blood serum that are greater than normal).

== Formulation ==
There are four quantities that describe concentration:

=== Mass concentration ===
The mass concentration $\rho_i$ is defined as the mass of a constituent $m_i$ divided by the volume of the mixture $V$:

$$\rho_i = \frac {m_i}{V}.$$

The SI unit is kg/m^{3} (equal to g/L).

=== Molar concentration ===
The molar concentration $c_i$ is defined as the amount of a constituent $n_i$ (in moles) divided by the volume of the mixture $V$:

$$c_i = \frac {n_i}{V}.$$

The SI unit is mol/m^{3}. However, more commonly the unit mol/L (= mol/dm^{3}) is used.

=== Number concentration ===
The number concentration $C_i$ is defined as the number of entities of a constituent $N_i$ in a mixture divided by the volume of the mixture $V$:

$$C_i = \frac{N_i}{V}.$$

The SI unit is 1/m^{3}.

=== Volume concentration ===
The volume concentration $\sigma_i$ (not to be confused with volume fraction) is defined as the volume of a constituent $V_i$ divided by the volume of the mixture $V$:

$$\sigma_i = \frac {V_i}{V}.$$

Being dimensionless, it is expressed as a number, e.g., 0.18 or 18%.

There seems to be no standard notation in the English literature. The letter $\sigma_i$ used here is normative in German literature.

== Related quantities ==
Several other quantities can be used to describe the composition of a mixture. These should not be called concentrations.

=== Normality ===
Normality is defined as the molar concentration $c_i$ divided by an equivalence factor $f_\mathrm{eq}$. Since the definition of the equivalence factor depends on context (which reaction is being studied), the International Union of Pure and Applied Chemistry and National Institute of Standards and Technology discourage the use of normality.

=== Molality ===
The molality of a solution $b_i$ is defined as the amount of a constituent $n_i$ (in moles) divided by the mass of the solvent $m_\mathrm{solvent}$ (not the mass of the solution):

$$b_i = \frac{n_i}{m_\mathrm{solvent}}.$$

The SI unit for molality is mol/kg.

=== Mole fraction ===
The mole fraction $x_i$ is defined as the amount of a constituent $n_i$ (in moles) divided by the total amount of all constituents in a mixture $n_\mathrm{tot}$:

$$x_i = \frac {n_i}{n_\mathrm{tot}}.$$

The SI unit is mol/mol. However, the deprecated parts-per notation is often used to describe small mole fractions.

=== Mole ratio ===
The mole ratio $r_i$ is defined as the amount of a constituent $n_i$ divided by the total amount of all other constituents in a mixture:

$$r_i = \frac{n_i}{n_\mathrm{tot}-n_i}.$$

If $n_i$ is much smaller than $n_\mathrm{tot}$, the mole ratio is almost identical to the mole fraction.

The SI unit is mol/mol. However, the deprecated parts-per notation is often used to describe small mole ratios.

=== Mass fraction ===
The mass fraction $w_i$ is the fraction of one substance with mass $m_i$ to the mass of the total mixture $m_\mathrm{tot}$, defined as:

$$w_i = \frac {m_i}{m_\mathrm{tot}}.$$

The SI unit is kg/kg. However, the deprecated parts-per notation is often used to describe small mass fractions.

=== Mass ratio ===
The mass ratio $\zeta_i$ is defined as the mass of a constituent $m_i$ divided by the total mass of all other constituents in a mixture:

$$\zeta_i = \frac{m_i}{m_\mathrm{tot}-m_i}.$$

If $m_i$ is much smaller than $m_\mathrm{tot}$, the mass ratio is almost identical to the mass fraction.

The SI unit is kg/kg. However, the deprecated parts-per notation is often used to describe small mass ratios.

== Dependence on volume and temperature ==
Concentration depends on the variation of the volume of the solution with temperature, due mainly to thermal expansion.

== Table of concentrations and related quantities ==
Concentration type	Symbol	Definition	SI unit	other unit(s)
mass concentration	$\rho_i$ or $\gamma_i$	$m_i/V$	kg/m^{3}	g/100mL (= g/dL)
molar concentration	$c_i$	$n_i/V$	mol/m^{3}	M (= mol/L)
number concentration	$C_i$	$N_i/V$	1/m^{3}	1/cm^{3}
volume concentration	$\sigma_i$	$V_i/V$	m^{3}/m^{3}	
Related quantities	Symbol	Definition	SI unit	other unit(s)
normality		$c_i/f_\mathrm{eq}$	mol/m^{3}	N (= mol/L)
molality	$b_i$	$n_i/m_\mathrm{solvent}$	mol/kg	m
mole fraction	$x_i$	$n_i/n_\mathrm{tot}$	mol/mol	ppm, ppb, ppt
mole ratio	$r_i$	$n_i/(n_\mathrm{tot}-n_i)$	mol/mol	ppm, ppb, ppt
mass fraction	$w_i$	$m_i/m_\mathrm{tot}$	kg/kg	ppm, ppb, ppt
mass ratio	$\zeta_i$	$m_i/(m_\mathrm{tot}-m_i)$	kg/kg	ppm, ppb, ppt
volume fraction	$\phi_i$	$V_i/\sum_j V_j$	m^{3}/m^{3}	ppm, ppb, ppt

== See also ==
- Dilution ratio – Change in concentration when mixing two liquids
- Dose concentration – Ratio of part of a mixture to the whole
- Serial dilution – Step-wise dilution of a substance in solution
- Wine/water mixing problem – Logic puzzle
- Standard state § Solutes
