= East Side Big Pipe =

American sewer line and tunnel

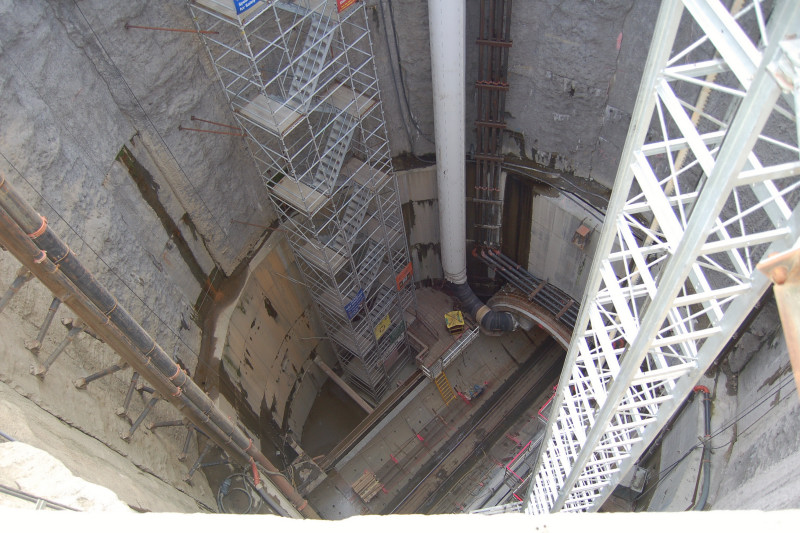
Looking down the main construction shaft to the East Side Big Pipe during construction

The East Side Big Pipe is a large sewer line and tunnel in Portland in the U.S. state of Oregon. It is part of a combined sewer system of pipes, sumps, drains, pumps, and other infrastructure that transports sewage and stormwater run-off to the city's Columbia Boulevard Wastewater Treatment Plant. The East Side Big Pipe project, begun in 2006 and finished in 2011, was the largest of a 20-year series of projects designed to nearly eliminate combined sewer overflows (CSO)s into the Willamette River and the Columbia Slough. The combined projects were completed on time, and they reduced CSOs into the river by 94 percent and into the slough by more than 99 percent.

== History ==
From the mid-19th century until the mid-20th century, Portland's combined sewer system poured untreated sewage into the Willamette River and the Columbia Slough. In 1952, the city built its first plant to treat wastewater, which included stormwater run-off as well as raw sewage. However, the existing sewer pipes were often overwhelmed by surges of stormwater from big storms, and the resulting CSOs continued to pollute the river and the slough. In 1991, the city signed an agreement with the Oregon Department of Environmental Quality to nearly eliminate these CSOs.

Over the next 20 years, the city took a series of steps to reach its goals: a 99 percent reduction in CSOs into the Columbia Slough by the year 2000 and a 94 percent reduction in CSOs into the river by December 2011. As first steps, the city helped property owners disconnect their roof drains from sewer lines, built separate storm sewers in some locations, diverted surface streams away from the combined sewers, and added sumps and other devices to control surges of stormwater. These relatively low-cost efforts reduced the stormwater entering the system by more than 2 billion US gallons (7.6 Gl) a year.

By 2000, the city completed a more complicated project, the 3.5-mile (5.6 km) Columbia Slough Consolidation Conduit. A separate project completed in 2006 centered on construction of the 3.5-mile (5.6 km) West Side CSO Tunnel and the Swan Island Pump Station. By late 2011, the city finished the largest of the CSO projects, the East Side Big Pipe. The combined projects were completed on schedule and met the intended goals.

== Technical details ==
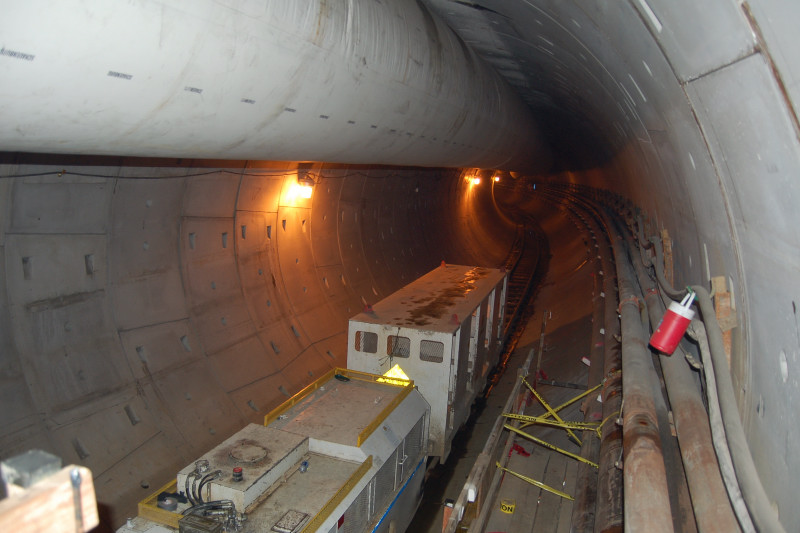
East Side Big Pipe under construction

Work on the East Side Big Pipe began in 2006 and was completed in late 2011. Its tunnel is almost 6 miles (9.7 km) long. It lies at an average of 150 feet (46 m) below the surface along the east bank of the Willamette River from the intersection of Southeast 17th Avenue and McLoughlin Boulevard to Swan Island. The pipe in the tunnel has an inside diameter of 22 feet (6.7 m).

The East Side tunnel was the largest sewer construction project ever undertaken by the City of Portland. A contractor, Kiewit-Bilfinger Berger (KBB), used a tunnel boring machine that was 300 feet (91 m) long and had a cutting head that was 25 feet (7.6 m) in diameter. In addition to the tunnel and the pipe, the project involved building seven access shafts, connecting pipelines, and the Portsmouth Forcemain, which carries sewage from the Swan Island Pump Station to the Columbia Boulevard Wastewater Treatment Plant.

The Portsmouth Forcemain, 3 miles (4.8 km) long and 66 inches (170 cm) in diameter, runs north from the pump station across Swan Island and under Waud Bluff and North Willamette Boulevard. There it meets the pre-existing Portsmouth Tunnel, which conveys combined sewage by gravity to the treatment plant.

Costs associated with the CSO projects, which totaled about $1.4 billion, included $450 million for the East Side CSO Tunnel and $70 million for the Portsmouth Forcemain. Most of the financing for the projects came from sewer ratepayers and almost none from state or Federal governments.

== Route ==
The route parallels the east side of the Willamette River mostly within a few blocks. Six vertical shafts were built to manage and facilitate tunnel construction. These are listed in reverse flow direction, or North to South.

Location name	Coordinate
Port Center shaft	45.55302°N 122.69564°W
River Street shaft	45.53670°N 122.67524°W
Steel Bridge shaft	45.52936°N 122.66649°W
Alder Shaft	45.51773°N 122.66250°W
Opera shaft	45.50619°N 122.66278°W
Taggart shaft	45.50271°N 122.66139°W
McLoughlin shaft	45.48651°N 122.64755°W

== Works cited ==
- "Combined Sewer Overflow CSO Abatement Program: Final Report, 1991–2011". Portland Bureau of Environmental Services. January 2012. Archived from the original on August 28, 2013.
