= Dilution ratio =

Change in concentration when mixing two liquids

In chemistry and biology, the dilution ratio and dilution factor are two related (but slightly different) expressions of the change in concentration of a liquid substance when mixing it with another liquid substance. They are often used for simple dilutions, one in which a unit volume of a liquid material of interest is combined with an appropriate volume of a solvent liquid to achieve the desired concentration. The diluted material must be thoroughly mixed to achieve the true dilution.

For example, in a solution with a 1:5 dilution ratio, entails combining 1 unit volume of solute (the material to be diluted) with 5 unit volumes of the solvent to give 6 total units of total volume.

In photographic development, dilutions are normally given in a '1+x' format. For example '1+49' would typically mean 1 part concentrate and 49 parts water, meaning a 500ml solution would require 10ml concentrate and 490ml water.

== Dilution factor ==
The "dilution factor" is an expression which describes the ratio of the aliquot volume to the final volume. Dilution factor is a notation often used in commercial assays. For example, in solution with a 1/5 dilution factor (which may be abbreviated as x5 dilution), entails combining 1 unit volume of solute (the material to be diluted) with (approximately) 4 unit volumes of the solvent to give 5 units of total volume. The following formulas can be used to calculate the volumes of solute (V_{solute}) and solvent (V_{solvent}) to be used:
$$\begin{align}
V_{\rm solute} &= \frac{V_{\rm total}}{F} \\[4pt]
V_{\rm solvent} &= V_{\rm total} - V_{\rm solute}
\end{align}$$
where V_{total} is the desired total volume, and F is the desired dilution factor number (the number in the position of F if expressed as "1/F dilution factor" or "xF dilution"). However, some solutions and mixtures take up slightly less volume than their components.

In other areas of science such as pharmacy, and in non-scientific usage, a dilution is normally given as a plain ratio of solvent to solute. For large factors, this confusion makes only a minor difference, but in precise work it can be important to make clear whether dilution ratio or dilution factor is intended.

== See also ==
- Fraction (chemistry)
- Concentration
- Ternary plot
