= Combined sewer =

Sewage collection system of pipes and tunnels designed to also collect surface runoff

A combined sewer system. During dry weather (and small storms), all flows are handled by the publicly owned treatment works (POTW). During large storms, the relief structure allows some of the combined stormwater and sewage to be discharged untreated to an adjacent water body.

A combined sewer is a type of gravity sewer with a system of pipes, tunnels, pump stations etc. to transport sewage and urban runoff together to a sewage treatment plant or disposal site. This means that during rain events, the sewage gets diluted, resulting in higher flowrates at the treatment site. Uncontaminated stormwater simply dilutes sewage, but runoff may dissolve or suspend virtually anything it contacts on roofs, streets, and storage yards. As rainfall travels over roofs and the ground, it may pick up various contaminants including soil particles and other sediment, heavy metals, organic compounds, animal waste, and oil and grease. Combined sewers may also receive dry weather drainage from landscape irrigation, construction dewatering, and washing buildings and sidewalks.

Combined sewers can cause serious water pollution problems during combined sewer overflow (CSO) events when combined sewage and surface runoff flows exceed the capacity of the sewage treatment plant, or of the maximum flow rate of the system which transmits the combined sources. In instances where exceptionally high surface runoff occurs (such as large rainstorms), the load on individual tributary branches of the sewer system may cause a back-up to a point where raw sewage flows out of input sources such as toilets, causing inhabited buildings to be flooded with a toxic sewage-runoff mixture, incurring costs for cleanup and repair. When combined sewer systems experience these higher than normal throughputs, relief systems cause discharges containing human and industrial waste to flow into rivers, streams, or other bodies of water. Such events frequently cause both negative environmental and lifestyle consequences, including beach closures, contaminated shellfish unsafe for consumption, and contamination of drinking water sources, rendering them temporarily unsafe for drinking and requiring boiling before uses such as bathing or washing dishes.

Mitigation of combined sewer overflows include sewer separation, CSO storage, expanding sewage treatment capacity, retention basins, screening and disinfection facilities, reducing stormwater flows, green infrastructure and real-time decision support systems.

This type of gravity sewer design is less often used nowadays when constructing new sewer systems. Modern-day sewer designs exclude surface runoff by building sanitary sewers instead, but many older cities and towns continue to operate previously constructed combined sewer systems.

== Development ==
The earliest sewers were designed to carry street runoff away from inhabited areas and into surface waterways without treatment. Before the 19th century, it was commonplace to empty human waste receptacles, e.g., chamber pots, into town and city streets and slaughter animals in open street "shambles". The use of draft animals such as horses and herding of livestock through city streets meant that most contained large amounts of excrement. Before the development of macadam as a paving material in the 19th century, paving systems were mostly porous, so that precipitation could soak away and not run off, and urban rooftop rainwater was often saved in rainwater tanks. Open sewers, consisting of gutters and urban streambeds, were common worldwide before the 20th century.

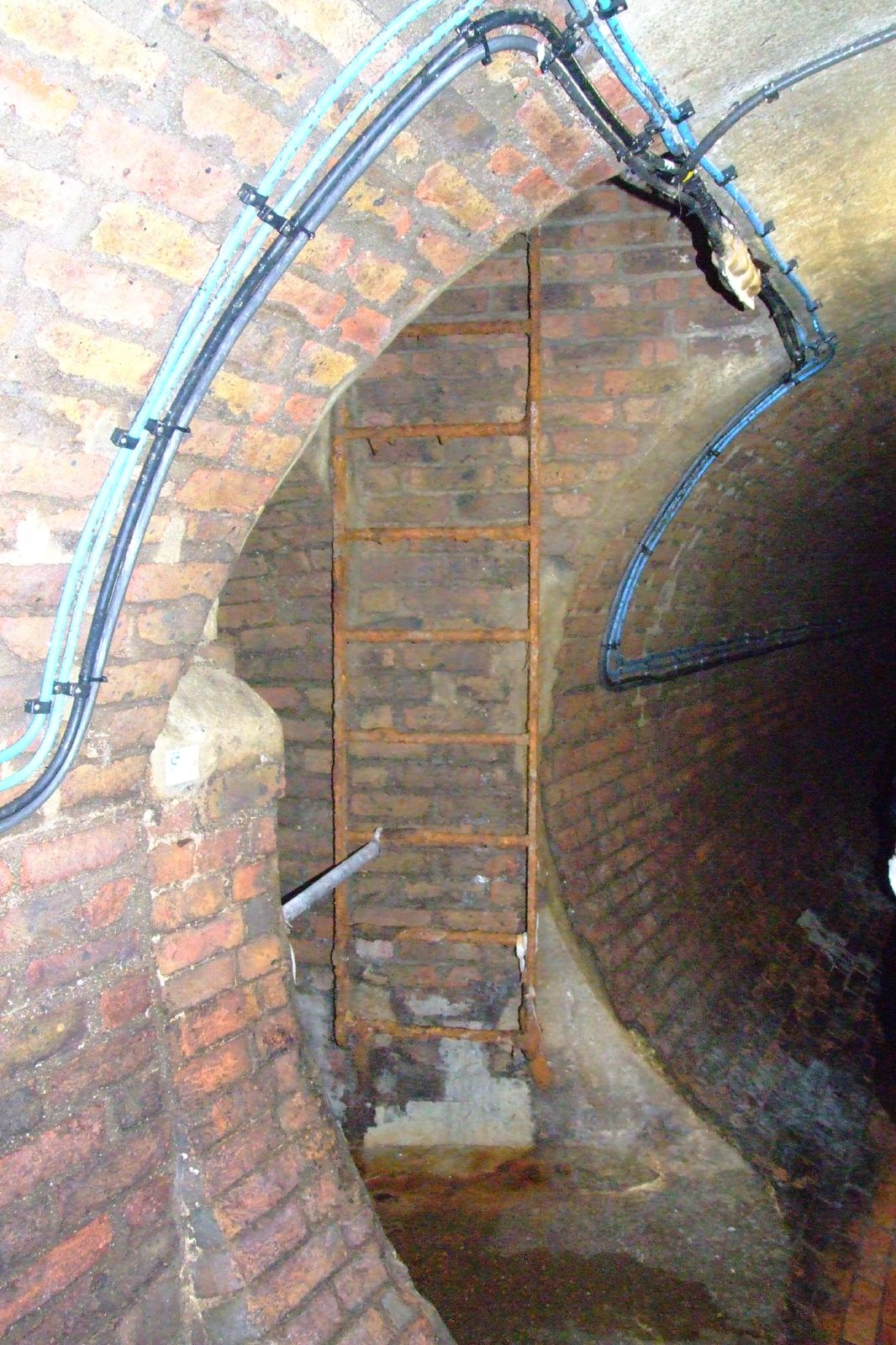
Interior of a combined sewer in Brighton, England.

In the majority of developed countries, large efforts were made during the late 19th and early 20th centuries to cover the formerly open sewers, converting them to closed systems with cast iron, steel, or concrete pipes, masonry, and concrete arches, while streets and footpaths were increasingly covered with impermeable paving systems. Most sewage collection systems of the 19th and early to mid-20th century used single-pipe systems that collect both sewage and urban runoff from streets and roofs (to the extent that relatively clean rooftop rainwater was not saved in butts and cisterns for drinking and washing.) This type of collection system is referred to as a "combined sewer system". The rationale for combining the two was that it would be cheaper to build just a single system.

Most cities at that time did not have sewage treatment plants, so there was no perceived public health advantage in constructing a separate "surface water sewerage" (UK terminology) or "storm sewer" (US terminology) system. Moreover, before the automobile era, runoff was likely to be typically highly contaminated with animal waste. Further, until the mid-late 19th century the frequent use of shambles (open-air slaughterhouses and meat markets) contributed more waste. The widespread replacement of horses with automotive propulsion, paving of city streets and surfaces, construction of municipal slaughterhouses, and provision of mains water in the 20th century changed the nature and volume of urban runoff to be initially cleaner, including water that formerly soaked away and previously saved rooftop rainwater after combined sewers were already widely adopted.

When constructed, combined sewer systems were typically sized to carry three to 160 times the average dry weather sewage flows. It is generally infeasible to treat the volume of mixed sewage and surface runoff flowing in a combined sewer during peak runoff events caused by snowmelt or convective precipitation. As cities built sewage treatment plants, those plants were typically built to treat only the volume of sewage flowing during dry weather. Relief structures were installed in the collection system to bypass untreated sewage mixed with surface runoff during wet weather, protecting sewage treatment plants from damage caused if peak flows reached the headworks.

== Combined sewer overflows (CSOs) ==
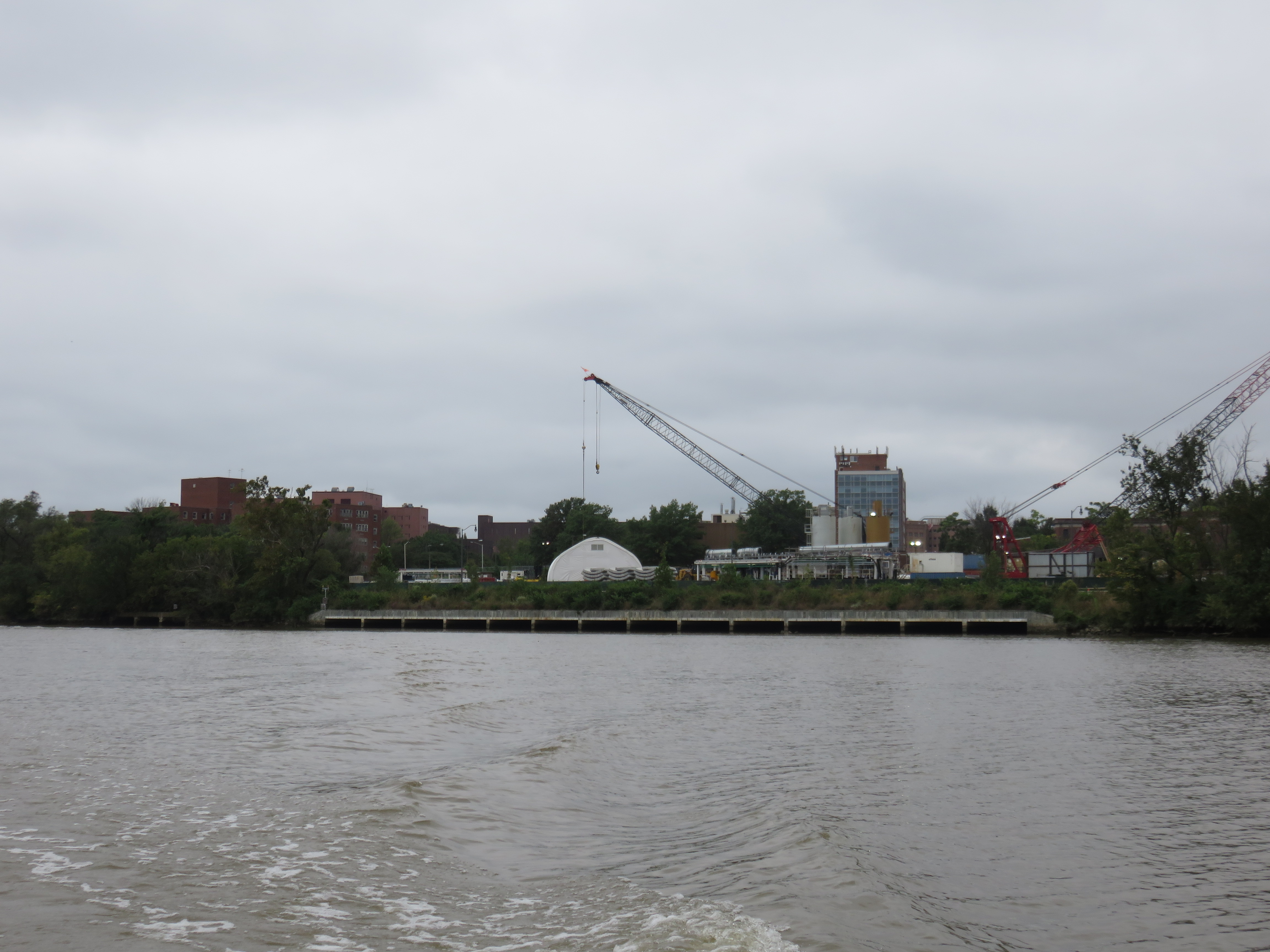
Combined sewer outflow into the Anacostia River in Washington, D.C.

Ratcliff Beach CSO discharges into the River Thames in London

Stormwater relief structures are called "combined sewer overflows" in UK and US terminology, and also are occasionally called "storm-water regulators" in the US. They are constructed in combined sewer systems to divert flows in excess of the peak design flow of the sewage treatment plant. Combined sewers are built with control sections establishing stage-discharge or pressure differential-discharge relationships which may be either predicted or calibrated to divert flows in excess of sewage treatment plant capacity.

A leaping weir may be used as a regulating device allowing typical dry-weather sewage flow rates to fall into an interceptor sewer to the sewage treatment plant, but causing a major portion of higher flow rates to leap over the interceptor into the diversion outfall. Alternatively, an orifice may be sized to accept the sewage treatment plant design capacity and cause excess flow to accumulate above the orifice until it overtops a side-overflow weir to the diversion outfall.

CSO statistics may be confusing because the term may describe either the number of events or the number of relief structure locations at which such events may occur. A CSO event, as the term is used in American English, occurs when mixed sewage and stormwater are bypassed from a combined sewer system control section into a river, stream, lake, or ocean through a designed diversion outfall, but without treatment. Overflow frequency and duration varies both from system to system, and from outfall to outfall, within a single combined sewer system. Some CSO outfalls discharge infrequently, while others activate every time it rains.

The storm water component contributes pollutants to CSO; but a major faction of pollution is the first foul flush of accumulated biofilm and sanitary solids scoured from the dry weather wetted perimeter of combined sewers during peak flow turbulence. Each storm is different in the quantity and type of pollutants it contributes. For example, storms that occur in late summer, when it has not rained for a while, have the most pollutants. Pollutants like oil, grease, fecal coliform from pet and wildlife waste, and pesticides get flushed into the sewer system. In cold weather areas, pollutants from cars, people and animals also accumulate on hard surfaces and grass during the winter and then are flushed into the sewer systems during heavy spring rains.

=== Health impacts ===
CSO discharges during heavy storms can cause serious water pollution problems. The discharges contain human and industrial waste, and can cause beach closings, restrictions on shellfish consumption and contamination of drinking water sources.

=== Comparison to sanitary sewer overflows ===
CSOs differ from sanitary sewer overflows (SSOs) in that the latter are caused by sewer system obstructions, damage, or flows in excess of sewer capacity (rather than treatment plant capacity). SSOs may occur at any low spot in the sewer system rather than at the CSO relief structures. Absence of a diversion outfall often causes SSOs to flood residential structures and/or flow over traveled road surfaces before reaching natural drainage channels. SSOs may cause greater health risks and environmental damage than CSOs if they occur during dry weather when there is no precipitation runoff to dilute and flush away sewage pollutants.

=== CSOs in the United States ===
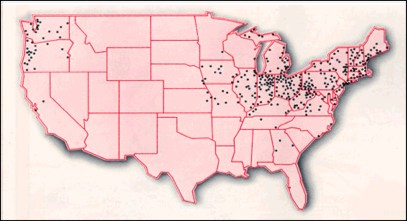
Most of the US combined sewer systems are in the Northeast and Great Lakes regions, and the Pacific Northwest.

About 860 communities in the US have combined sewer systems, serving about 40 million people. Pollutants from CSO discharges can include bacteria and other pathogens, toxic chemicals, and debris. These pollutants have also been linked with antimicrobial resistance, posing serious public health concerns.

The U.S. Environmental Protection Agency (EPA) issued a policy in 1994 requiring municipalities to make improvements to reduce or eliminate CSO-related pollution problems. The policy is implemented through the National Pollutant Discharge Elimination System (NPDES) permit program. The policy defined water quality parameters for the safety of an ecosystem; it allowed for action that are site specific to control CSOs in most practical way for community; it made sure the CSO control is not beyond a community's budget; and allowed water quality parameters to be flexible, based upon the site specific conditions.

The CSO Control Policy required all publicly owned treatment works to have "nine minimum controls" in place by January 1, 1997, in order to decrease the effects of sewage overflow by making small improvements in existing processes. In 2000 Congress amended the Clean Water Act to require the municipalities to comply with the EPA policy.

=== CSOs in Europe ===
There are estimated to be more than 628,000 CSOs in Europe (estimated 650,000 in 2020 including the United Kingdom).

=== CSOs in the United Kingdom ===
Most of the United Kingdom has a combined sewage system, designed to overflow during heavy rainfall and discharge into the sea and rivers. There are about 22,000 CSOs in the United Kingdom, of which about 15,000 are in England.

In 2024, the Environment Agency recorded 445,297 spills (CSOs+SSOs) with a total duration of 3,582,658 hours.

=== CSOs in Australia ===
Most sewerage systems in Australia are not designed to transport stormwater, but some combined systems were constructed in the late 19th and early 20th Century. Most have since been separated into stormwater and sewerage systems.

== Mitigation of CSOs ==
Mitigation of combined sewer overflows include sewer separation, CSO storage, expanding sewage treatment capacity, retention basins, screening and disinfection facilities, reducing stormwater flows, green infrastructure and real-time decision support systems. For example, cities with combined sewer overflows employ one or more engineering approaches to reduce discharges of untreated sewage, including:

- utilizing a green infrastructure approach to improve storm water management capacity throughout the system, and reduce the hydraulic overloading of the treatment plant
- repair and replacement of leaking and malfunctioning equipment
- increasing overall hydraulic capacity of the sewage collection system (often a very expensive option).

The United Kingdom Environment Agency identified unsatisfactory intermittent discharges and issued an Urban Wastewater Treatment Directive requiring action to limit pollution from combined sewer overflows. In 2009, the Canadian Council of Ministers of the Environment adopted a Canada-wide Strategy for the Management of Municipal Wastewater Effluent including national standards to (1) remove floating material from combined sewer overflows, (2) prevent combined sewer overflows during dry weather, and (3) prevent development or redevelopment from increasing the frequency of combined sewer overflows.

Rehabilitation of combined sewer systems to mitigate CSOs require extensive monitoring networks which are becoming more prevalent with decreasing sensor and communication costs. These monitoring networks can identify bottlenecks causing the main CSO problem, or aid in the calibration of hydrodynamic or hydrological models to enable cost effective CSO mitigation.

Municipalities in the US have been undertaking projects to mitigate CSO since the 1990s. For example, prior to 1990, the quantity of untreated combined sewage discharged annually to lakes, rivers, and streams in southeast Michigan was estimated at more than 30 billion US gallons (110,000,000 m^{3}) per year. In 2005, with nearly $1 billion of a planned $2.4 billion CSO investment put into operation, untreated discharges have been reduced by more than 20 billion US gallons (76,000,000 m^{3}) per year. This investment that has yielded an 85 percent reduction in CSO has included numerous sewer separation, CSO storage and treatment facilities, and wastewater treatment plant improvements constructed by local and regional governments.

Many other areas in the US are undertaking similar projects (see, for example, in the Puget Sound of Washington). Cities like Pittsburgh, Seattle, Philadelphia, and New York are focusing on these projects partly because they are under federal consent decrees to solve their CSO issues. Both up-front penalties and stipulated penalties are utilized by EPA and state agencies to enforce CSO-mitigating initiatives and the efficiency of their schedules. Municipalities' sewage departments, engineering and design firms, and environmental organizations offer different approaches to potential solutions.

=== Sewer separation ===
Some US cities have undertaken sewer separation projects—building a second piping system for all or part of the community. In many of these projects, cities have been able to separate only portions of their combined systems. High costs or physical limitations may preclude building a completely separate system. In 2011, Washington, D.C., separated its sewers in four small neighborhoods at a cost of $11 million. (The project cost also included improvements to the drinking water piping system.)

=== CSO storage ===
Another solution is to build a CSO storage facility, such as a tunnel that can store flow from many sewer connections. Because a tunnel can share capacity among several outfalls, it can reduce the total volume of storage that must be provided for a specific number of outfalls. Storage tunnels store combined sewage but do not treat it. When the storm is over, the flows are pumped out of the tunnel and sent to a wastewater treatment plant. One of the main concerns with CSO storage is the length of time it is stored before it is released. Without careful management of this storage period, the water in the CSO storage facility runs the risk of going septic.

Portland, Oregon built underground storage, completing the West Side CSO Tunnel in 2006 and the East Side Big Pipe in 2011.

Washington, D.C., is building underground storage capacity as its primary strategy to address CSOs. In 2013 the city began construction of a deep tunnel system for its "Clean Rivers Project." Four deep storage tunnels totaling 18 miles (29 km) in length are being built adjacent to the Anacostia River, along with green infrastructure projects, and will reduce overflows to the river by 98 percent, and 96 percent system-wide. As of 2025 portions of the storage tunnel system are in operation, with project completion scheduled for 2030. The South Boston CSO Storage Tunnel is a similar project, completed in 2013.

Indianapolis, Indiana, is building underground storage capacity in the form of a 28-mile (45 km) 18-foot (5.5 m) diameter deep rock tunnel system which will connect the two existing wastewater treatment plants. This project, known as the DigIndy project, will provide collection of discharge water from the various CSO sites located along the White River, Eagle Creek, Fall Creek, Pogue's Run, and Pleasant Run. Citizens Energy Group is managing the efforts to construct the first phases of the work, which includes a 250-foot (76 m) deep Deep Rock Tunnel Connector between the Belmont Wastewater Treatment Plant and the Southport Wastewater Treatment Plant. Additional tunnels will branch under the existing watercourses located in Indianapolis. The planned cost for the project will total $1.9 billion.

Fort Wayne, Indiana, is constructing a 4.5-mile (7.2 km), 14-foot (4.3 m) diameter, $180M tunnel under the 3RPORT (Three Rivers Protection and Overflow Reduction Tunnel) to address the myriad CSOs which outfall into the St. Mary's, St. Joseph, and Maumee Rivers. The 3RPORT is approximately 160 feet (49 m) below grade, and is anticipated to enter service in 2023.

In March 2024 the Thames Tideway Tunnel was completed in London at a cost of around £5bn, with it reaching full operation in early 2025. The tunnel promises to reduce CSO spills by up to 95%.

=== Expanding sewage treatment capacity ===
Some cities have expanded their basic sewage treatment capacity to handle some or all of the CSO volume. In 2002 litigation forced the city of Toledo, Ohio, to double its treatment capacity and build a storage basin in order to eliminate most overflows. The city also agreed to study ways to reduce stormwater flows into the sewer system. (See Reducing stormwater flows.)

=== Retention basins ===
Retention treatment basins or large concrete tanks that store and treat combined sewage are another solution. These underground structures can range in storage and treatment capacity from 2 million US gallons (7,600 m^{3}) to 120 million US gallons (450,000 m^{3}) of combined sewage. While each facility is unique, a typical facility operation is as follows. Flows from the overloaded sewers are pumped into a basin that is divided into compartments. The first flush compartment captures and stores flows with the highest level of pollutants from the first part of a storm. These pollutants include motor oil, sediment, road salt, and lawn chemicals (pesticides and fertilizers) that are picked up by the stormwater as it runs off roads and lawns. The flows from this compartment are stored and sent to the wastewater treatment plant when there is capacity in the interceptor sewer after the storm.

The second compartment is a treatment or flow-through compartment. The flows are disinfected by injecting sodium hypochlorite, or bleach, as they enter this space. It then takes about 20‑30 minutes for the flows to move to the end of the compartment. During this time, bacteria are killed and large solid materials settle out. At the end of the compartment, any remaining sanitary trash is skimmed off the top, and the treated flows are discharged into the river or lake.

The City of Detroit, Michigan, utilizes a system of nine CSO retention basins and screening/disinfection facilities that are owned and operated by the Great Lakes Water Authority. These basins are located at original combined sewer outfalls located along the Detroit River and Rouge River within metropolitan Detroit. These facilities are generally designed to contain two inches of stormwater runoff, with the ability to disinfect overflows during extreme wet-weather rainfall events.

=== Screening and disinfection facilities ===
Screening and disinfection facilities treat CSO without ever storing it. Called "flow-through" facilities, they use fine screens to remove solids and sanitary trash from the combined sewage. Flows are injected with sodium hypochlorite for disinfection and mixed as they travel through a series of fine screens to remove debris. The fine screens have openings that range in size from 4 to 6 mm, or a little less than a quarter inch. The flow is sent through the facility at a rate that provides enough time for the sodium hypochlorite to kill bacteria. All of the materials removed by the screens are then sent to the sewage treatment plant through the interceptor sewer.

=== Reducing stormwater flows ===
Communities may implement low impact development techniques to reduce flows of stormwater into the collection system. This includes:

- constructing new and renovated streets, parking lots and sidewalks with interlocking stones, permeable paving and pervious concrete
- installing green roofs on buildings
- installing bioretention systems, also called rain gardens, in landscaped areas
- installing rainwater harvesting equipment to collect runoff from building roofs during wet weather for irrigating landscapes and gardens during dry weather
- implementing graywater collection and use on site to reduce sewage discharges at all times

=== Green infrastructure ===
CSO mitigating initiatives that are solely composed of sewer system reconstruction are referred to as gray infrastructure, while techniques like permeable pavement and rainwater harvesting are referred to as green infrastructure. Conflict often occurs between a municipality's sewage authority and its environmentally active organizations between gray and green infrastructural plans.

The 2004 EPA Report to Congress on CSO's provides a review of available technologies to mitigate CSO impacts.

=== Real-time decision support systems ===
Recent technological advances in sensing and control have enabled the implementation of real-time decision support systems (RT-DSS) for CSO mitigation. Through the use of internet of things technology and cloud computing, CSO events can now be mitigated by dynamically adjusting setpoints for movable gates, pump stations, and other actuated assets in sewers and storm water management systems. Similar technology, called adaptive traffic control is used to control the flow of vehicles through traffic lights. RT-DSS systems take advantage of storm temporal and spatial variability as well as varying concentration times due to diverse land uses across the sewershed to coordinate and optimize control assets. By maximizing storage and conveyance RT-DSS are able to minimize overflows using existing infrastructure. Successful implementations of RT-DSS have been carried out throughout the United States and Europe.

Real-time control (RTC) can be either heuristic or model based. Model-based control is theoretically more optimal, but due to the ease of implementation, heuristic control is more commonly applied. Generating sufficient evidence that RTC is a suitable option for CSO mitigation remains problematic, although new performance methods might make this possible.

== Regulations ==
=== United Kingdom ===
There is in the UK a legal difference between a storm sewer and a surface water sewer. There is no right of connection to a storm-water overflow sewer under section 106 of the Water Industry Act.

These are normally the pipe line that discharges to a watercourse, downstream of a combined sewer overflow. It takes the excess flow from a combined sewer. A surface water sewer conveys rainwater; legally there is a right of connection for rainwater to this public sewer. A public storm water sewer can discharge to a public surface water, but not the other way around, without a legal change in sewer status by the water company.

== History ==
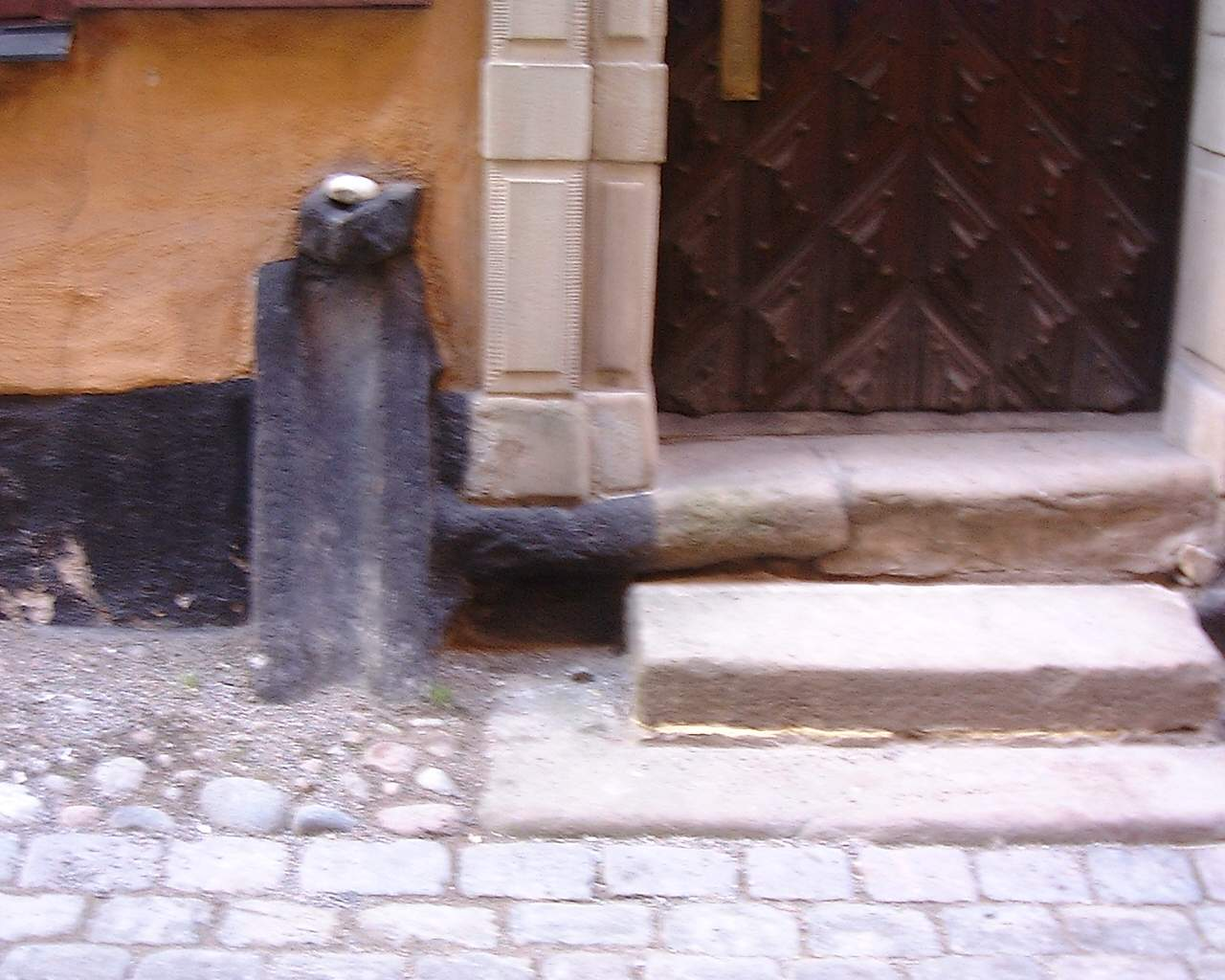
A medieval waste pipe in Stockholm Old Town formerly deposited sewage on the street to be flushed away by rain.

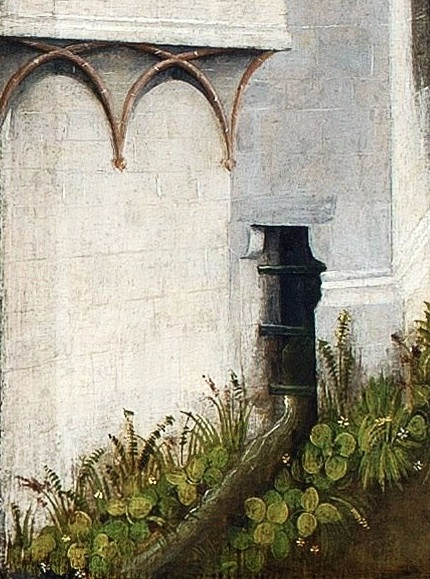
Sewage canal of a medieval house as depicted in 1447 St. Barbara Altarpiece in the National Museum in Warsaw.

Combined sewer systems were common when urban sewerage systems were first developed, in the late 19th and early 20th centuries.

Archaeological discoveries have shown that some of the earliest sewer systems were developed in the third millennium BCE in the ancient cities of Harappa and Mohenjo-daro in present-day Pakistan. The primitive sewers were carved in the ground alongside buildings. This discovery reveals the conceptual understanding of waste disposal by early civilizations.

== Society and culture ==
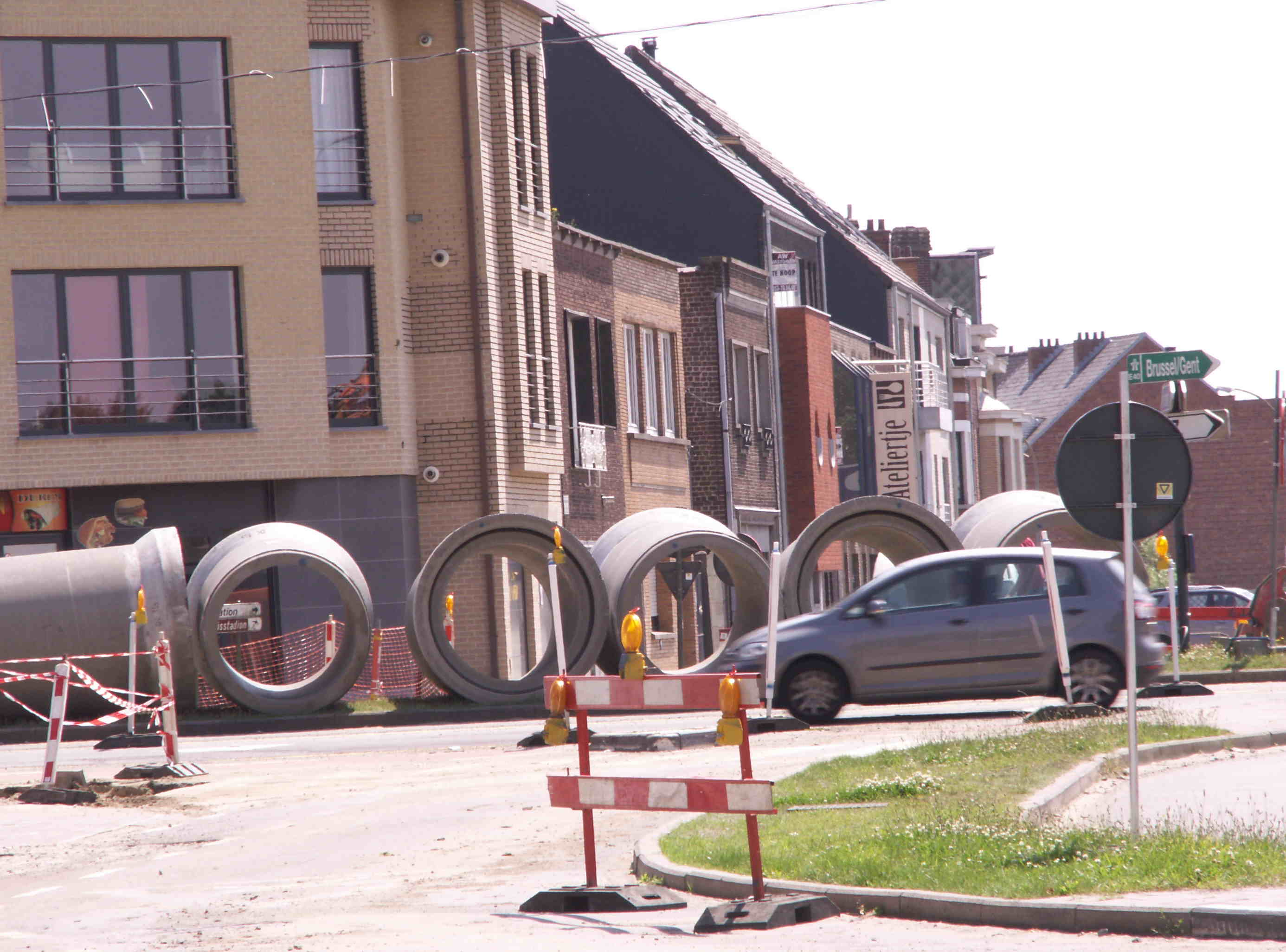
A combined sewer-pipe being laid by the city's sewerage company in Ghent, Belgium.

The image of the sewer recurs in European culture as they were often used as hiding places or routes of escape by the scorned or the hunted, including partisans and resistance fighters in World War II. Fighting erupted in the sewers during the Battle of Stalingrad. The only survivors from the Warsaw Uprising and Warsaw Ghetto made their final escape through city sewers. Some have commented that the engravings of imaginary prisons by Piranesi were inspired by the Cloaca Maxima, one of the world's earliest sewers.

=== In fiction ===
The theme of traveling through, hiding, or even residing in combined sewers is a common plot device in media. Famous examples of sewer dwelling are the Teenage Mutant Ninja Turtles, Stephen King's It, Les Misérables, The Third Man, Ladyhawke, Mimic, The Phantom of the Opera, Beauty and the Beast, and Jet Set Radio Future. The Todd Strasser novel Y2K-9: the Dog Who Saved the World is centered on a dog thwarting terroristic threats to electronically sabotage American sewage treatment plants.

=== Sewer alligators ===
A well-known urban legend, the sewer alligator, is that of giant alligators or crocodiles residing in combined sewers, especially in major metropolitan areas. Two public sculptures in New York depict an alligator dragging a hapless victim into a manhole.

Alligators have been known to get into combined storm sewers in the southeastern United States. Closed-circuit television by a sewer repair company recorded images on tape of an alligator in a combined storm sewer.

== See also ==
- Fatberg (sewer obstruction)
- Sanitary sewer overflow
- Thames Tideway Scheme
- Storm drain
