= Grinder pump =

Wastewater disposal device

A grinder pump (also called a macerator pump) is a wastewater conveyance device. Waste from water-using household appliances (toilets, bathtubs, washing machines, etc.) flows through the home’s pipes into the grinder pump’s holding tank. Once the wastewater inside the tank reaches a specific level, the pump will turn on, grind the waste into a fine slurry, and pump it to the central sewer system or septic tank.

Grinder pumps can be installed in the basement or in the yard. If installed in the yard, the holding tank must be buried deep enough that the pump and sewage pipes are below the frost line.

A grinder pump is different from a sump pump or effluent pump. There are two types of grinder pumps, semi-positive displacement (SPD) and centrifugal.

== Components ==
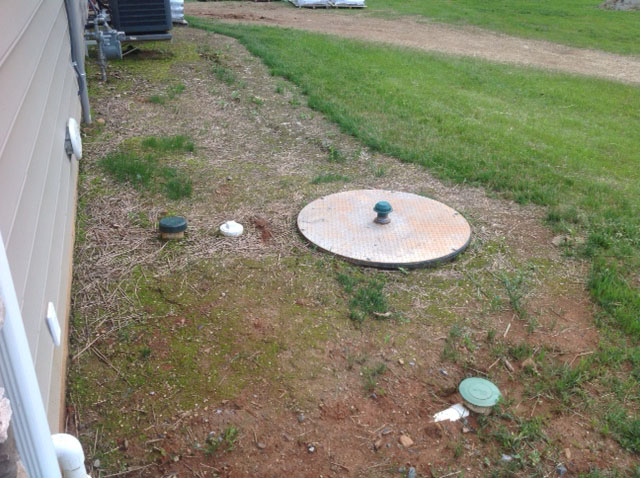
Grinder pump station with fiberglass tank and stainless steel lid installed outside a home

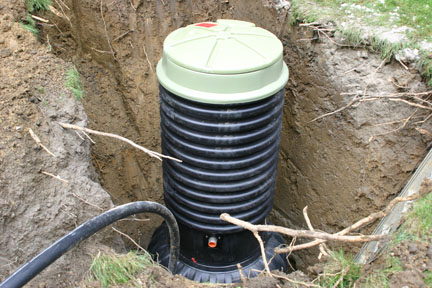
Grinder pump station with HDPE tank being installed

The grinder pump “station” consists of the pump, a tank, and an alarm panel. A pump for household use is usually rated for 1, 1.5, or 2 hp. A cutting mechanism macerates waste and grinds items that are not normally found in sewage, but may get flushed down the toilet. The pump has a level sensor either built into the pump, called “sensing bells”, or attached externally to the pump, typically a float switch. (The level sensing devices vary among grinder pump manufacturers.) If the pump malfunctions and the waste level in the holding tank rises above a certain level, the alarm panel should alert the homeowner that the pump is experiencing problems. The alarm panel should have both a buzzer and an indicator light.

The holding tank, likely constructed of fiberglass, high-density polyethylene (HDPE) or fiberglass-reinforced polyester (FRP), has an inlet opening and a discharge opening. The pipes from the home are connected to the inlet; the pipe that leads to the sewer main is connected to the discharge. Often, more than one home or restroom (in a park, for example) can be connected to one grinder pump station. In this case, more than one inlet can be installed. It is a good idea to consult the manufacturer or factory representative before purchasing a grinder pump station to ensure that more than one inlet hole can be drilled.

The tank has a lid made from heavy-duty plastic or metal that is bolted and/or padlocked shut to prevent entry by unauthorized persons.

== Maintenance ==
Grinder pumps should not require preventive maintenance. However, grinder pumps that use floats to sense the level in the holding tank are prone to grease buildup that may turn the pump on unnecessarily, or not turn on the pump at all, causing the tank to fill up and sewage to possibly back up into the home or yard. To prevent this, grinder pumps that use float switches to sense the level in the tank are often hosed down to remove the grease from the floats.

Homeowners are never free to dump everything down their drains, even if their home has a grinder pump. Feminine hygiene products, diapers, kitty litter, paint, oil (both motor oil and cooking oils), etc. should not be flushed or poured down any drain, regardless of whether the home is connected to a gravity sewer system, septic tank, grinder pump, or cesspool.

Disposable wipes that are made by cleaning companies for personal use, cleaning toilets, etc. are causing problems in communities around the United States. Not only do people clog their household plumbing, they are causing problems with household grinder pumps, lift stations, and sewage treatment plants. Some wipe companies say "flush one at a time", some say "not for pump systems", some claim "safe for sewers", but this advice may be overly optimistic.

As recommended by Consumer Reports magazine, wipes should always be put into a garbage can instead of the toilet. The National Association of Clean Water Agencies has compiled a list of articles and municipal documents regarding wipes.

In large sewage pump stations, clogging problems are often avoided by installing a chopper pump in the tank. A chopper pump is able to handle larger/tougher solids than a residential grinder pump, and may be able to process hair balls, diapers, sanitary napkins, clothing, etc.

== See also ==
- Chopper pump
- Sewage pumping
- Sewer system
