= Macerator =

Macerator may refer to:

- Maceration (sewage), a machine that reduces solids to small pieces, particularly at a pumping station
- Chopper pumps, pump with cutting system to facilitate chopping/maceration of solids
- Sewage pumping, where maceration of solids is used
- Maceration (cooking), reduction of food into small pieces
- A character from the Transformers franchise
