= Sump pump =

Type of pump

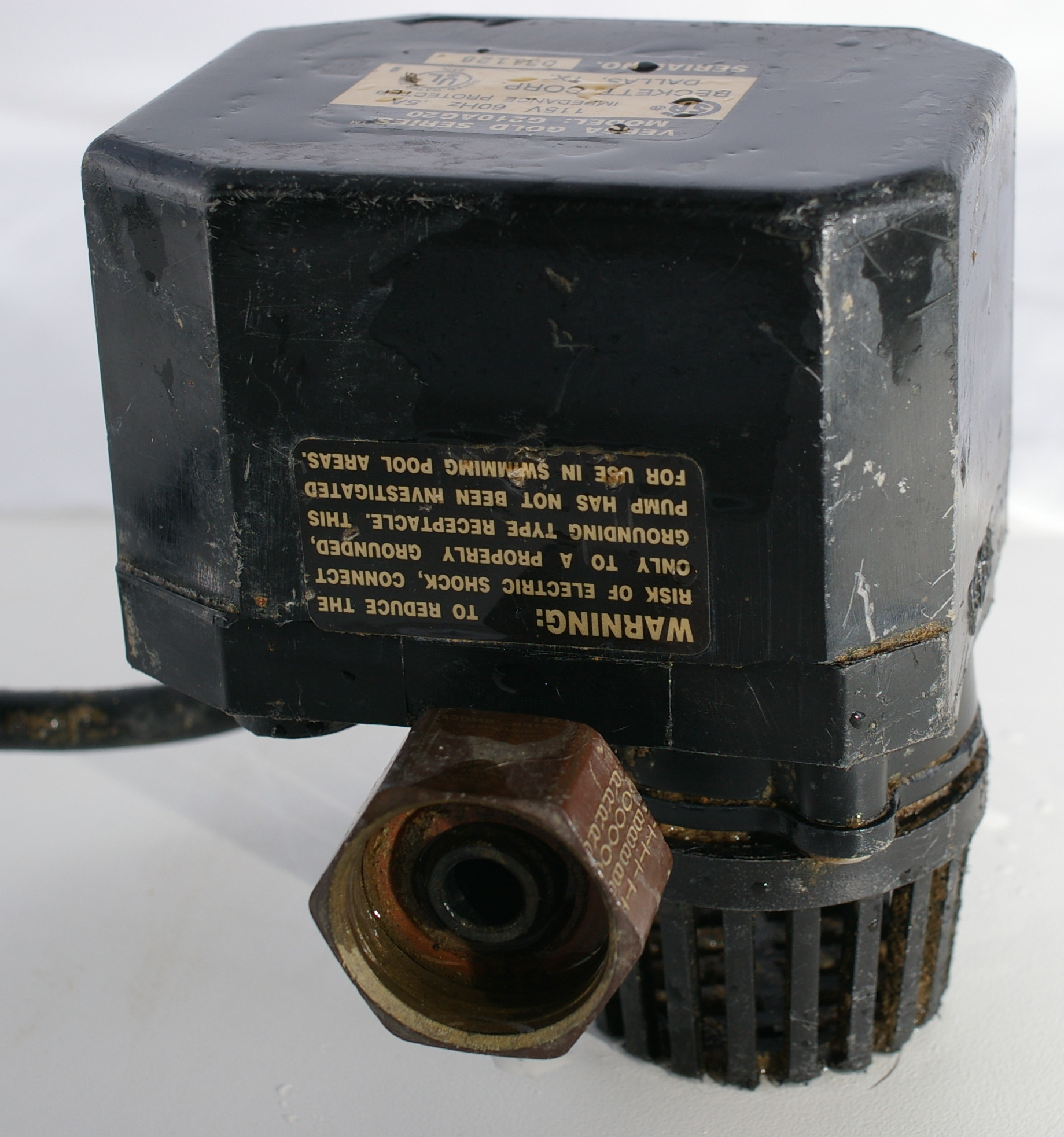
A small submersible AC sump pump with a garden hose connector

A sump pump is a pump used to remove water that has accumulated in a water-collecting sump basin, commonly found in the basements of homes and other buildings, and in other locations where water must be removed, such as construction sites. The water may enter via the perimeter drains of a basement waterproofing system funneling into the basin, or because of rain or natural ground water seepage if the basement is below the water table level.

More generally, a "sump" is any local depression where water may accumulate. For example, many industrial cooling towers have a built-in sump where a pool of water is used to supply water spray nozzles higher in the tower. Sump pumps are used in industrial plants, construction sites, mines, power plants, military installations, transportation facilities, or anywhere that water can accumulate.

== Description ==
Sump pumps are used where basement flooding may otherwise happen, and to solve dampness where the water table is near or above the foundation of a structure. Sump pumps send water away from a location to any place where it is no longer problematic, such as a municipal storm drain, a dry well, or simply an open-air site downhill from the building (sometimes called "pumping to daylight").

Pumps may discharge to the sanitary sewer in older installations. Once considered acceptable, this practice may now violate the plumbing code or municipal bylaws, because it can overwhelm the municipal sewage treatment system. Municipalities urge building owners to disconnect and reroute sump pump discharge away from sanitary sewers. Fines may be imposed for noncompliance. Many homeowners have inherited their sump pump configurations and do not realize that their pump discharges into the sanitary sewer.

Sump pump systems are also utilized in industrial and commercial applications to control water table-related problems in surface soil. An artesian aquifer or periodic high water table situation can cause the ground to become unstable due to water saturation. As long as the pump functions, the surface soil will remain stable. These sumps are typically ten feet in depth or more; lined with corrugated metal pipe that contains perforations or drain holes throughout. They may include electronic control systems with visual and audible alarms and are usually covered to prevent debris and animals from falling in.

== Power ==
Sump pumps may be plugged into an electrical power receptacle. In this case, it is safer to use a dedicated circuit, which is less likely to lose power from a blown fuse or tripped circuit breaker. In addition, the dedicated circuit may not require GFCI protection, as it is less vulnerable to false tripping due to electrical noise, especially during thunderstorms. The dedicated circuit receptacle may be specially labeled to warn against unplugging the pump, or the plug may be attached using a special retaining bracket to discourage unplugging. Instead, the pump may be hardwired to electrical power, so that it cannot be unplugged.

Since a sump basin may overflow if not pumped, a backup system is important for cases when the main power is out for prolonged periods of time, as during a severe storm.

Some sump pumps can be automatically powered from a battery backup system, or a separate battery-powered system may be installed, typically with its float switch set slightly higher than the float switch of the primary pump.

Using a separate generator is another option. These do often require a manual setup.

Alternatively, the municipal pressurized water supply powers some pumps, which can operate using a water turbine, or by using the Venturi effect. This design eliminates the need for electricity but consumes potable water, potentially making it more expensive to operate than electrical pumps and creating an additional water disposal problem. This design is used more for backup pumps rather than primary pumps.

The main thing to check with the alternative backup electricity sources is whether they offer enough power.

Sump pumps tend to require at least 230 volts although smaller models in the United States can sometimes run on 120 volts. Similarly, watt and amp needs of sump pumps can vary. Consumer models can vary from 700 running watts to 2300 watts and more. Gallons per watt-hour is a measure of efficiency in sump pumps.

Additionally, sump pumps will typically require an extra burst of power known as additional starting watts to get running. This can be as much as 1.5 times and more than the running watt and amp needs.

Industrial sump pumps may be powered by other means, such a steam or compressed air, especially for backup pumps or in locations where access for maintenance is difficult.

== Physical configuration ==
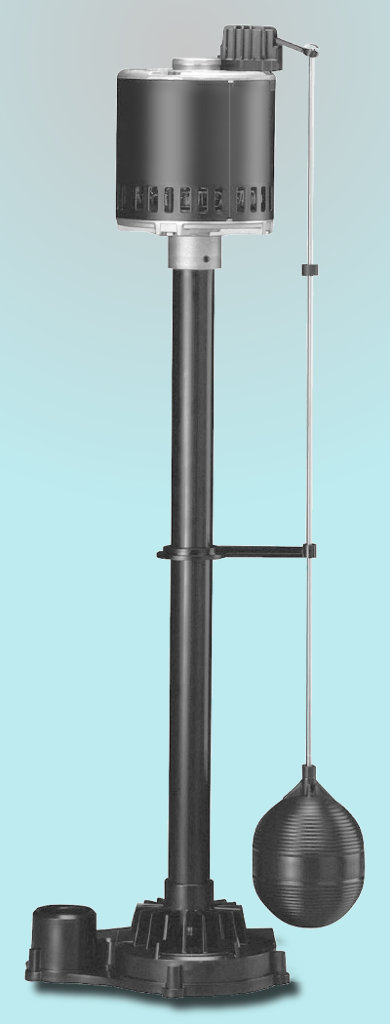
A typical pedestal-type sump pump

There are generally two types of residential sump pumps: pedestal and submersible. In the case of the pedestal pump, the motor is not sealed and sits on a column to protect it from moisture. This type of installation is more conspicuous since the motor is usually positioned above the top of the basin. Within the column, the motor shaft is connected to the impeller, which rotates inside a scroll housing at the bottom of the basin. A switch mounted in the motor turns the motor on as the water level in the basin rises, and shuts it off when the basin is empty; this automatic level control permits operation of the pump without constant monitoring. In a submersible pump, the motor is sealed in a special housing, with the impeller mounted directly to the shaft. Automatic level control can be integrated within the pump, or as an auxiliary switch with little or no physical connection to the pump.

Which type of sump pump to use is a matter of personal choice. Pedestal sump pumps were the only option through most of the 20th Century, with cast iron and bronze construction similar to large commercial pumps. But technological and design improvements made submersible pumps much more reliable, and the compact design allows the basin to be covered, eliminating a trip and fall hazard, and reducing the potential of radon intrusion in the home. Since the level control switch is the primary point of failure with any sump pump, submersible pumps with auxiliary, or "piggyback", designs allow for replacement of the switch with minimal effort. Today, submersible pumps are the most popular style, while residential pedestal pumps are low volume, economical designs with limited service life.

== Components ==
In the United States, modern sump pump components are standardized. They consist of:

- A basin, made of composite materials like ABS plastic or fiberglass reinforced resin, with a minimum inside diameter of 18 inches, and a minimum depth of 30 inches, and an inlet connection to accommodate a 4" drainpipe, an approximately 15 to 25 US gallons (60 to 100 litre) capacity;
- A sump pump, either 1/3 or 1/2 horsepower (250 or 370 W), operates on 115 volts, plugs into a standard receptacle. Pipe connections are either 1.25" or 1.5", National Pipe Thread (NPT), and a level control to allow for automatic operation;
- A section of pipe to carry water away from the home; manufactured from steel, iron, or plastic, National Sanitation Foundation (or NSF) rated for pressure;
- A one-way valve (check valve) that allows water to flow away from the basin, but prevents water in the pipe from returning to the basin.
- A basin cover that provides passage for the power cord, discharge pipe, and possibly a vent pipe.

== Pump selection ==
Selection of a sump pump may consider:

- Automatic vs. manual operation – pump may be controlled automatically by a level switch.
- Power – Sump pump motive power will vary from 1/4 horsepower to multiple horsepower.
- Head pressure – The hydraulic head pressure of a sump pump describes the maximum height to which the pump will move water. For instance, a sump pump with a 15 feet (4.6 m) maximum head (also called a shutoff head) will raise water up 15 feet (4.6 m) before it completely loses flow.
- Power cord length – Running a more powerful electrical motor a long distance from the main service panel will require heavier gauge wiring to assure sufficient voltage at the motor for proper pump performance.
- Phase and voltage – Sump pumps powered from the AC mains are available with single-phase or three-phase induction motors, rated for 110–120, 220–240, or 460 volts. Three-phase power is typically not available in residential locations, but is common in industrial locations.
- Water level sensing switch type – Pressure switches are fully enclosed, usually inside the pump body, making them immune to obstructions or floating debris in the sump basin. Float switches, particularly the types attached to the end of a short length of flexible electrical cable, can get tangled or obstructed, especially if the pump is prone to movement in the basin due to torque effects when starting and stopping. Pressure switches are typically factory set and not adjustable, while float switches can be adjusted in place to set the high and low water levels in the sump basin. Another option is a solid state switch utilizing field-effect technology, which can turn on and off the pump through use of an internal switch and a piggyback plug.
- Backup system and alarm for critical applications.

== Backup components ==
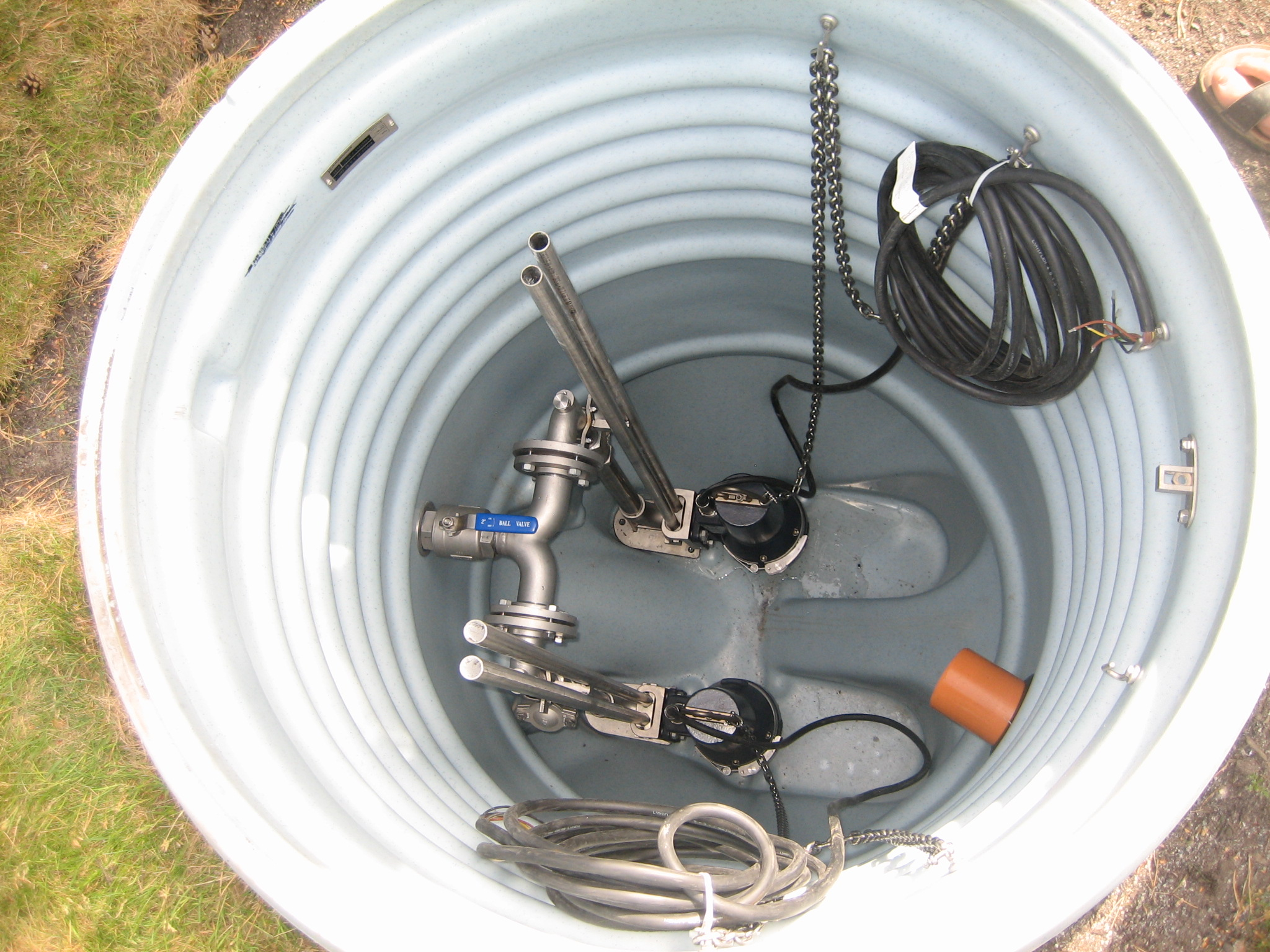
A dual pump setup for better reliability

A secondary, typically battery-powered sump pump can operate if the first pump fails. A battery-powered secondary pump will have a separate battery and charger system to provide power if normal supply is interrupted.

Alternative sump pump systems can be driven by municipal water pressure. Water-powered ejector pumps have a separate pump, float and check valve. The float controlling a backup pump is mounted in the sump pit above the normal high water mark. Under normal conditions, the main electric powered sump pump will handle all the pumping duties. When water rises higher than normal for any reason, the backup float in the sump is lifted and activates the backup sump pump. An ejector pump can also be connected to a garden hose to supply high-pressure water, with another hose to carry the water away. Although such ejector pumps waste water and are relatively inefficient, they have the advantage of having no moving parts and offer the utmost in reliability.

If the backup sump system is rarely used, a component failure may not be noticed, and the system may fail when needed. Some battery control units test the system periodically and alert on failed electrical components.

A simple, battery-powered water alarm can be hung a short distance below the top of the sump to sound an alarm should the water level rise too high. The alarm may sound locally only, or optionally may trigger remote notification via a telephone or cellphone data link.

== Maintenance ==
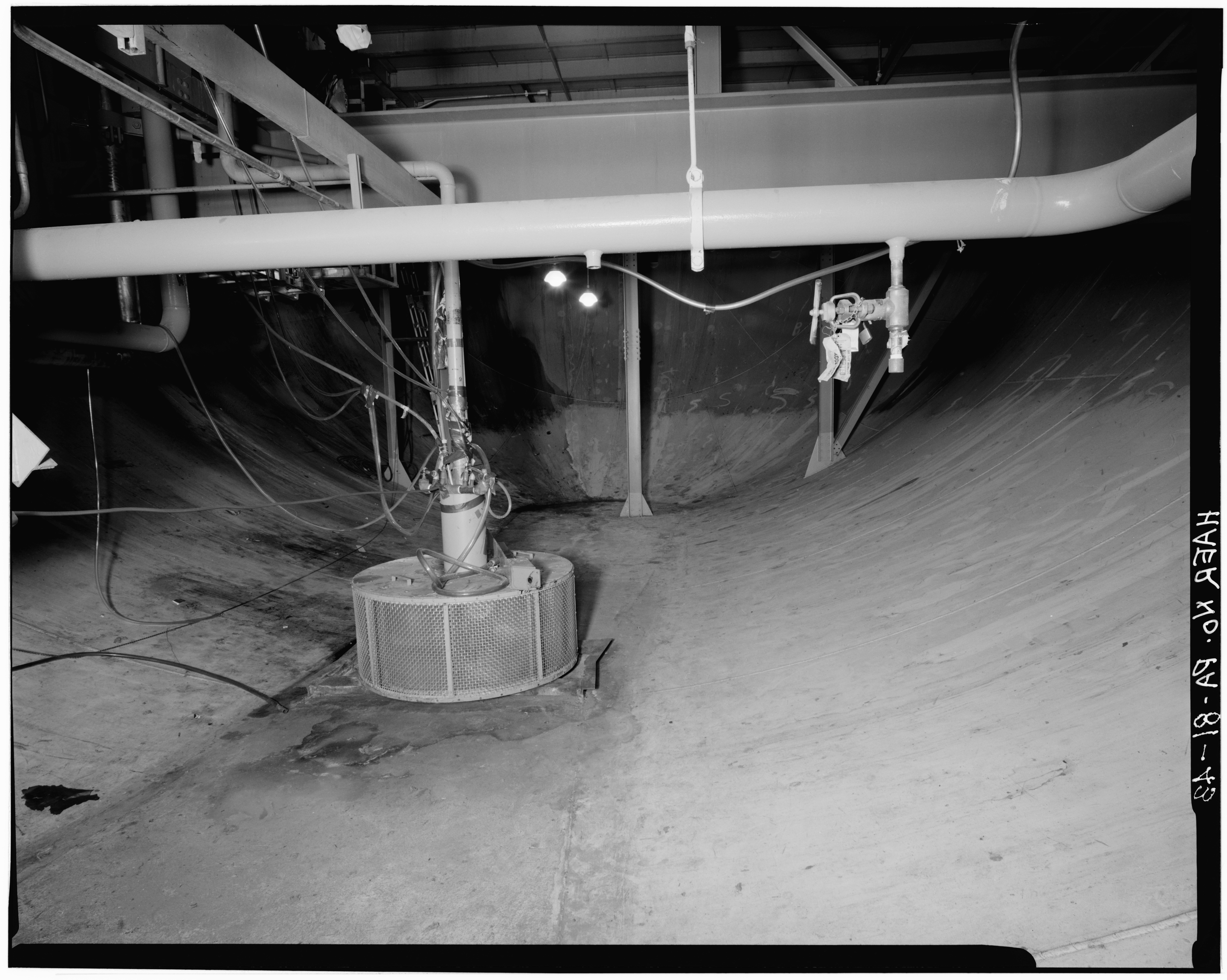
A large industrial sump pump at a nuclear power plant

Sump basins and sump pumps must be maintained. Typical recommendations suggest examining and testing equipment every year. Pumps running frequently due to higher water table, water drainage, or weather conditions should be examined more frequently. Sump pumps, being mechanical devices, will fail eventually, which could lead to a flooded basement and costly repairs. Redundancy in the system (multiple/secondary pumps) can help to avoid problems when maintenance and repairs are needed on the primary system.

When examining a sump pump and cleaning it, dirt, gravel, sand, and other loose debris should be removed to increase efficiency and extend the life of the pump. These obstructions can decrease the pump's ability to drain the sump, and can allow the sump to overflow. The check valve can also jam from the debris. Periodic examination of the discharge line opening, when applicable, ensures there are no obstructions or restrictions in the line. A partially obstructed discharge line can force a sump pump to work harder and increase its chance of overheating and failure.

Float switches are used to automatically turn the sump pump on when water rises to a preset level. Float switches must be kept clear of any obstructions within the sump. A float guard can be used to prevent the float switch from accidentally resting on the pump housing, and remaining on. If a sump pump remains operating for a long time (especially in the absence of cooling water for submersibles) it may overheat or burn out. Because mechanical float switches can wear out, they should be periodically tested by actuating them manually to assure that they continue to move freely and that the switch contacts are opening and closing properly.

If left in standing water, pedestal pumps should be manually run from time to time, even if the water in the sump is not high enough to trip the float switch. This is because these pumps are incapable of removing all the water in a sump, and the lower bearing or bushing for the pump impeller shaft tends to remain submerged, making it prone to corrosion and eventually freezing the drive shaft in the bearing. In the alternative, a pedestal pump that is expected to remain idle for an extended time should be removed from the sump and stored out of water, or the sump should be mopped out to bring the level of the remaining water well below the lower shaft bearing.

Lastly, if an independent water detector and alarm system is installed, it should be tested regularly.

== See also ==
- Bilge pump
- Chopper pump
- Sewage pump
