= Float (liquid level) =

Buoyant object for indicating or measuring liquid level

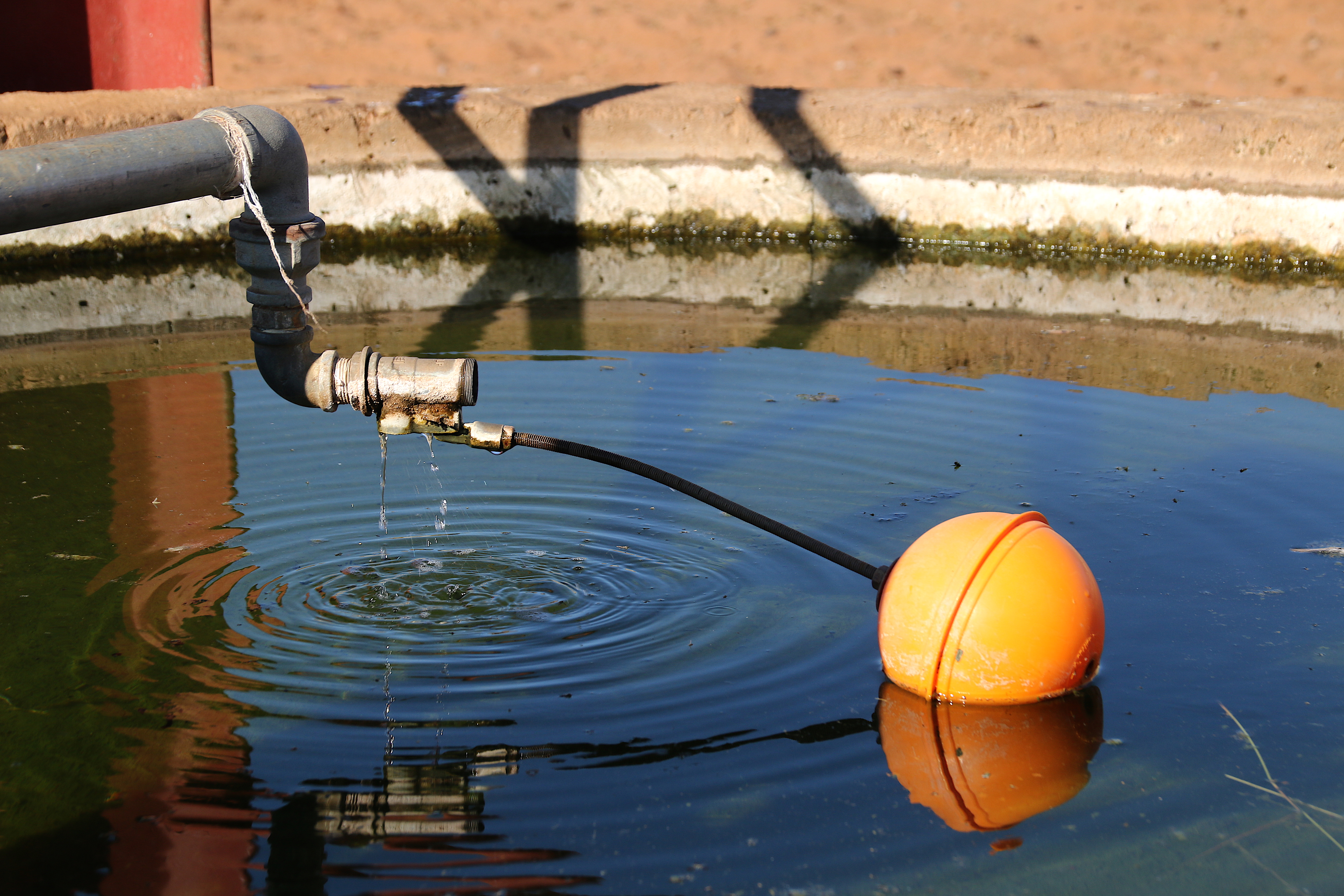
A float ball (in orange color)

Liquid level floats, also known as float balls, are spherical, cylindrical, oblong or similarly shaped objects, made from either rigid or flexible material, that are buoyant in water and other liquids. They are non-electrical hardware frequently used as visual sight-indicators for surface demarcation and level measurement. They may also be incorporated into switch mechanisms or translucent fluid-tubes as a component in monitoring or controlling liquid level.

Liquid level floats, or float switches, use the principle of material buoyancy (differential densities) to follow fluid levels. Solid floats are often made of plastics with a density less than water or other application liquid, and so they float. Hollow floats filled with air are much less dense than water or other liquids, and are appropriate for some applications.

Stainless steel magnetic floats are tubed magnetic floats, used for reed switch activation; they have a hollow tubed connection running through them. These magnetic floats have become standard equipment where strength, corrosion resistance and buoyancy are necessary. They are manufactured by welding two drawn half shells together. The welding process is critical for the strength and durability of the float. The weld is a full penetration weld providing a smoothly finished seam, hardly distinguishable from the rest of the float surface.

Liquid level floats can also be constructed with thermoplastic corrosion-resistant materials. These materials include PVC, polypropylene and PVDF. An example of an application that would require such materials would be if a manufacturer of metal plating and metal finishing lines required continuous level measurement of their chromic acid tanks. Stainless Steel would rapidly corrode in chromic acid, which is why one would have the option to go with a PVDF float, which is a material with great chemical resistance to chromic acid.

Thermoplastic level floats are a great alternative to some other forms of level sensors such as ultrasonic or radar when dealing with corrosive chemical applications. This is because some chemicals create vapor blankets or corrosive fumes inside of tanks. Liquid level floats are unaffected by any foam, vapor, turbulence or condensate inside of the tanks that would normally cause issues with an ultrasonic or radar level sensor.

== See also ==
- Level sensor
- Float switch
