= Lighter (barge) =

Type of flat-bottomed barge

A lighter is a type of flat-bottomed barge used to transfer goods and passengers to and from moored ships. Lighters were traditionally unpowered and were moved and steered using long oars called "sweeps" and the motive power of water currents. They were operated by skilled workers called lightermen and were a characteristic sight in London's docks until about the 1960s, when technological changes made this form of lightering largely redundant. Unpowered lighters continue to be moved by powered tugs, however, and lighters may also now themselves be powered. The term is also used in the Lighter Aboard Ship (LASH) system.

The name itself is of uncertain origin, but is believed to possibly derive from an old Dutch or German word, lichten (to lighten or unload). In Dutch and German, the words lichter or Leichter are still used for smaller ships that take over goods from larger ships.

Lighters, albeit powered ones, were proposed to be used in 2007 at Port Lincoln and Whyalla in South Australia to load Capesize ships which are too big for the shallower waters close to shore.

== Lighter tug ==
The lighter barge gave rise to the "lighter tug", a small, manoeuvrable type of harbour tug. Lighter tugs—or simply "lighters"—are designed for towing lighter barges. As such, they are smaller than traditional harbour tugs and lack the power or equipment to handle large ships.

== Operations ==
=== Hong Kong ===
Hong Kong widely uses lighters in midstream operations where lighters transport cargo, mostly containers, between oceangoing vessels or to and from terminals. Lighters in Hong Kong are usually equipped with cranes of 40-60 tonnes capacity, and the largest ones can carry up to 300 TEU containers (empties). Lighters are usually not fitted with engines but are towed or pushed by tugboats. In 2007, midstream operators handled about 2 million TEUs and 5 million TEUs were transported as river trade cargo, which are heavily dependent on lighters.

=== United Kingdom ===
In the UK, some older lighters have been converted into houseboats (for living on the river). As they lack engine rooms and gearbox, shaft or propellers, this means maximum usage of the hull space into housespace. As they have no propulsion methods, they are towed from conversion sites to permanent or semi-permanent mooring sites. They have macerators to deal with toilet waste.

== Gallery ==
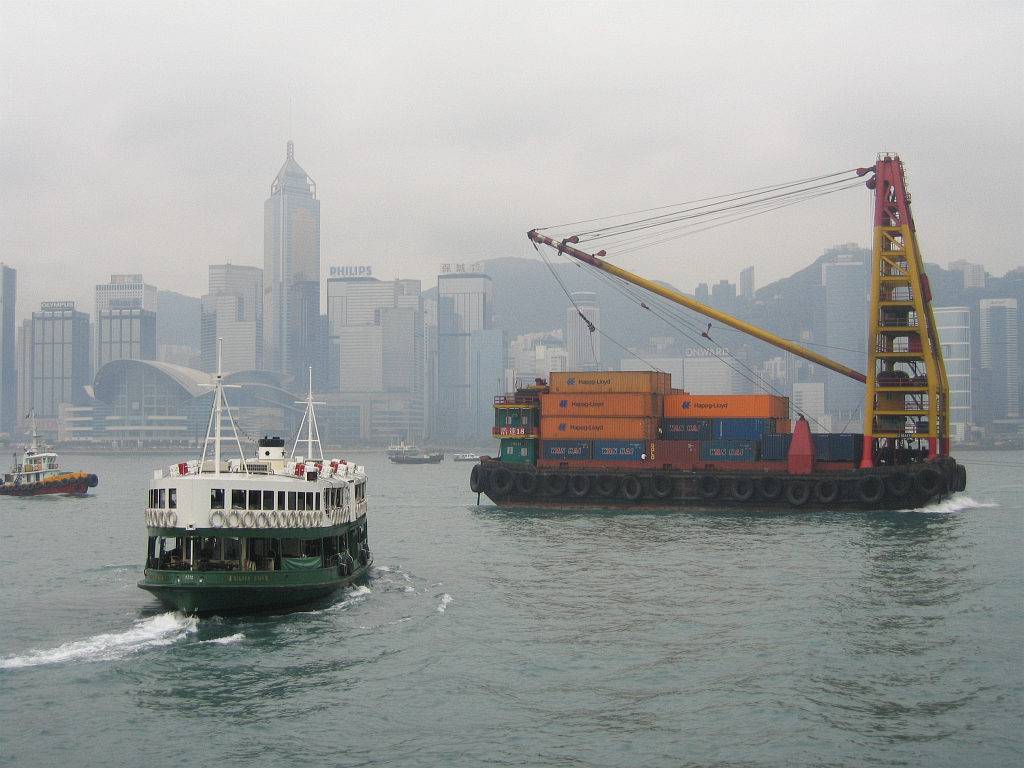
A lighter carrying shipping containers (loaded and unloaded by the tall derrick-crane on the lighter's top-deck) in Hong Kong's Victoria Harbour.

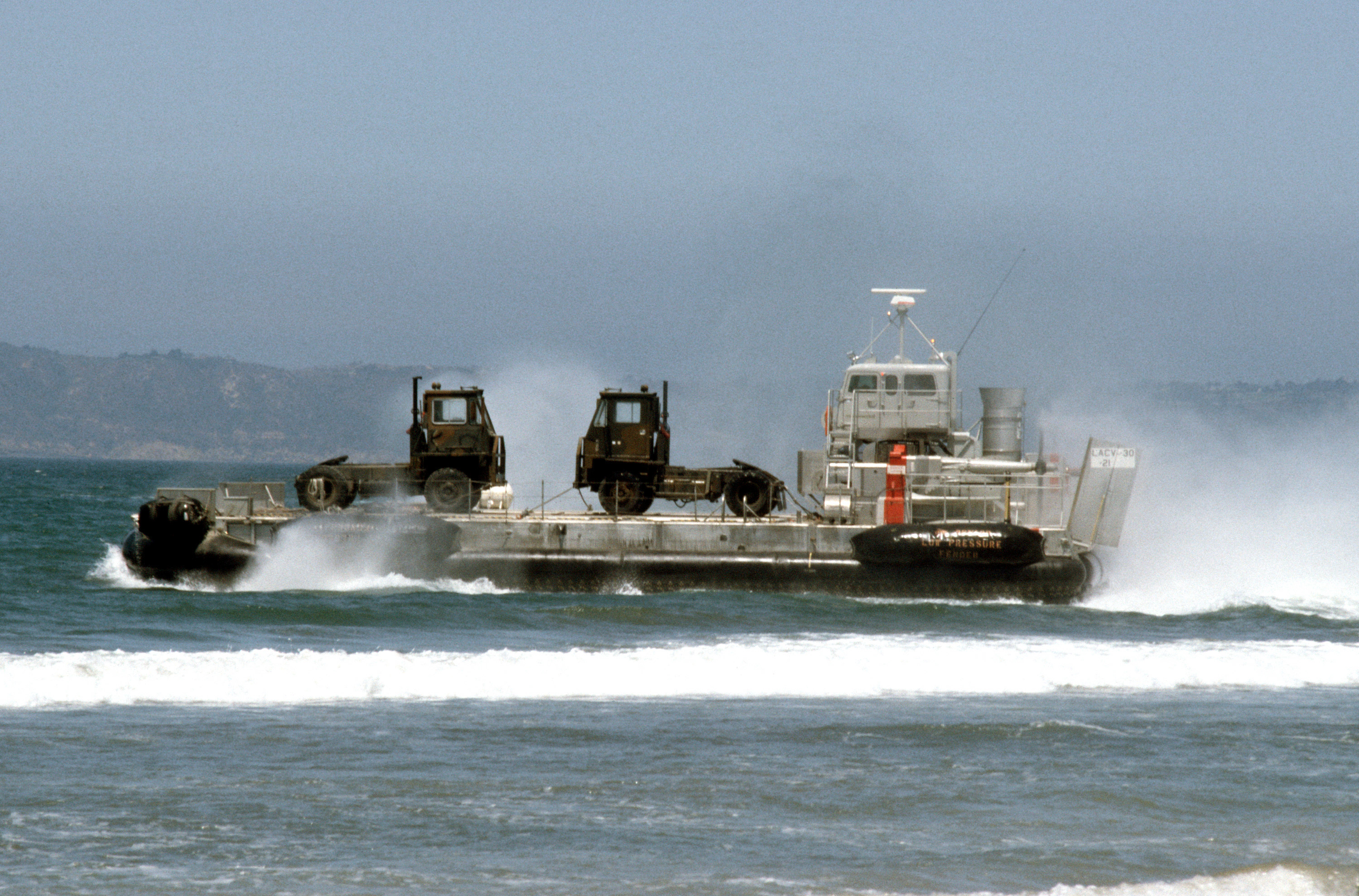
A US Army LACV-30 (Lighter Air Cushion Vehicle - 30 Ton) hovercraft transporting ground-support military equipment to the shore in 1986.

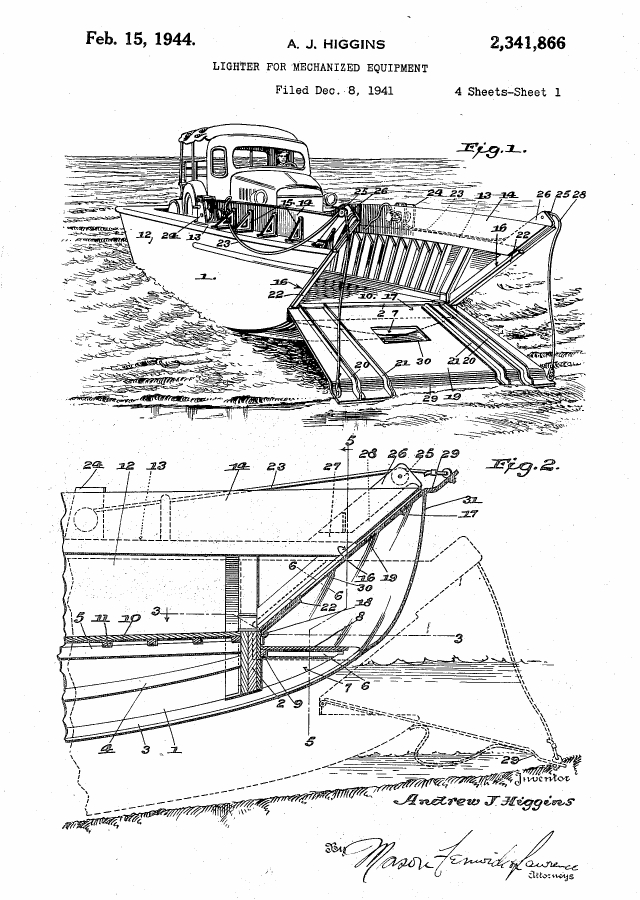
A lighter for mechanized equipment designed by A. J. Higgins in 1941

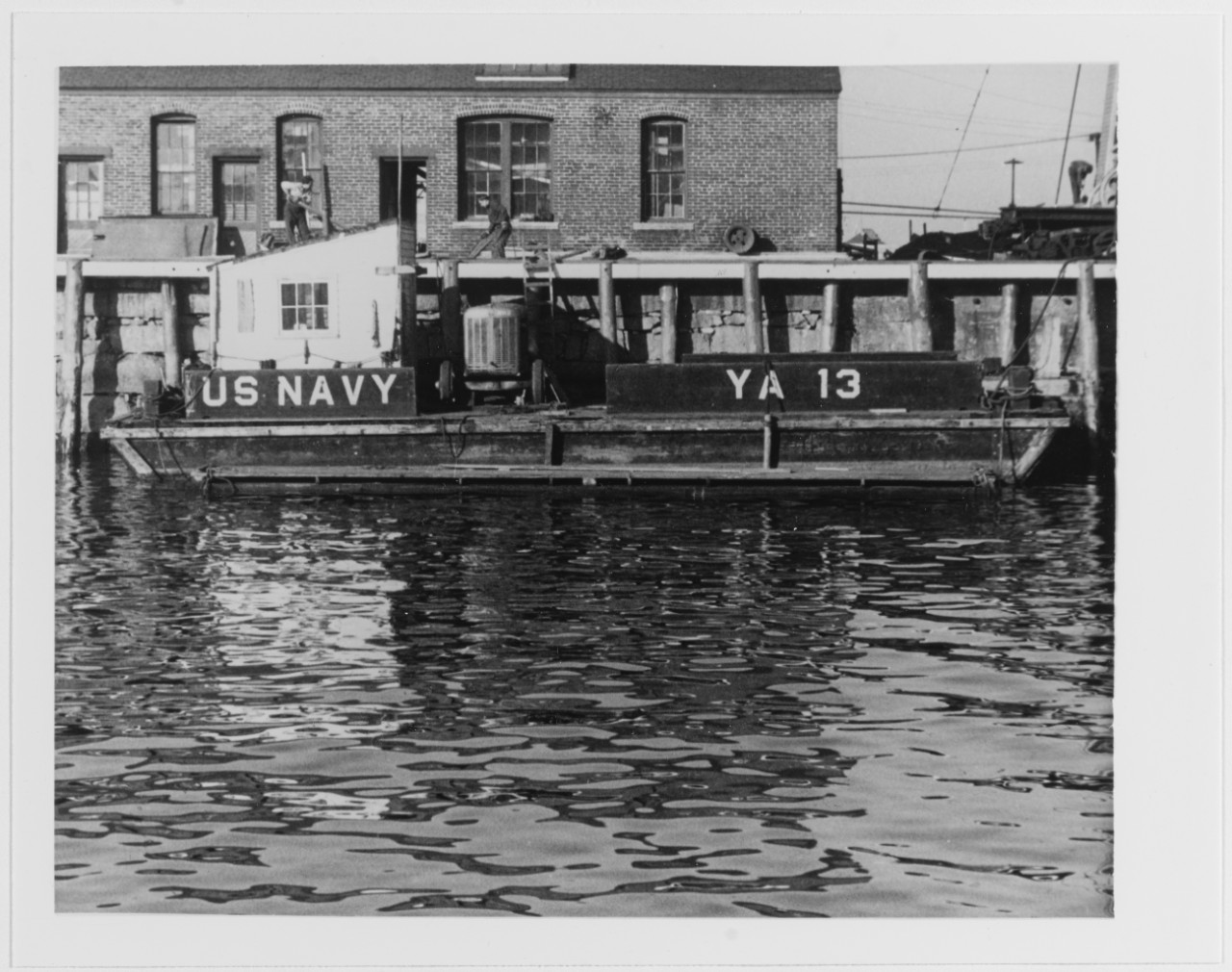
USN Ash Lighter (YA-13) photographed in 1941

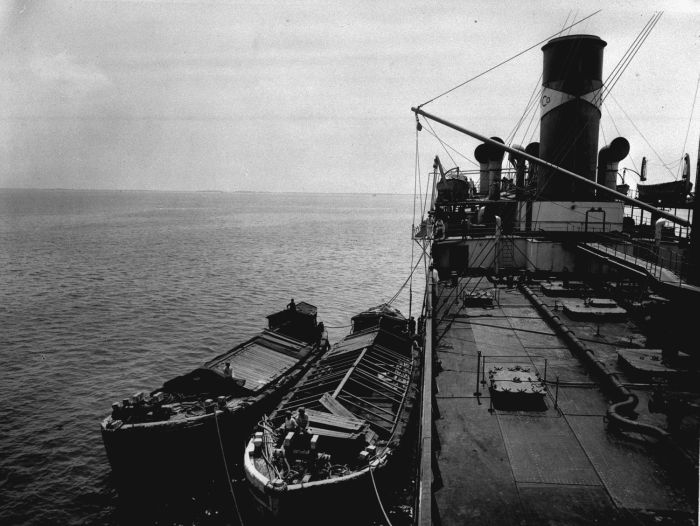
Several lighters beside a cargo ship's side somewhere off Java in the Dutch East Indies (present-day Indonesia), about 1925.

== See also ==
- Car float
- Dutch barge
- Type B ship
