= Gallon per watt-hour =

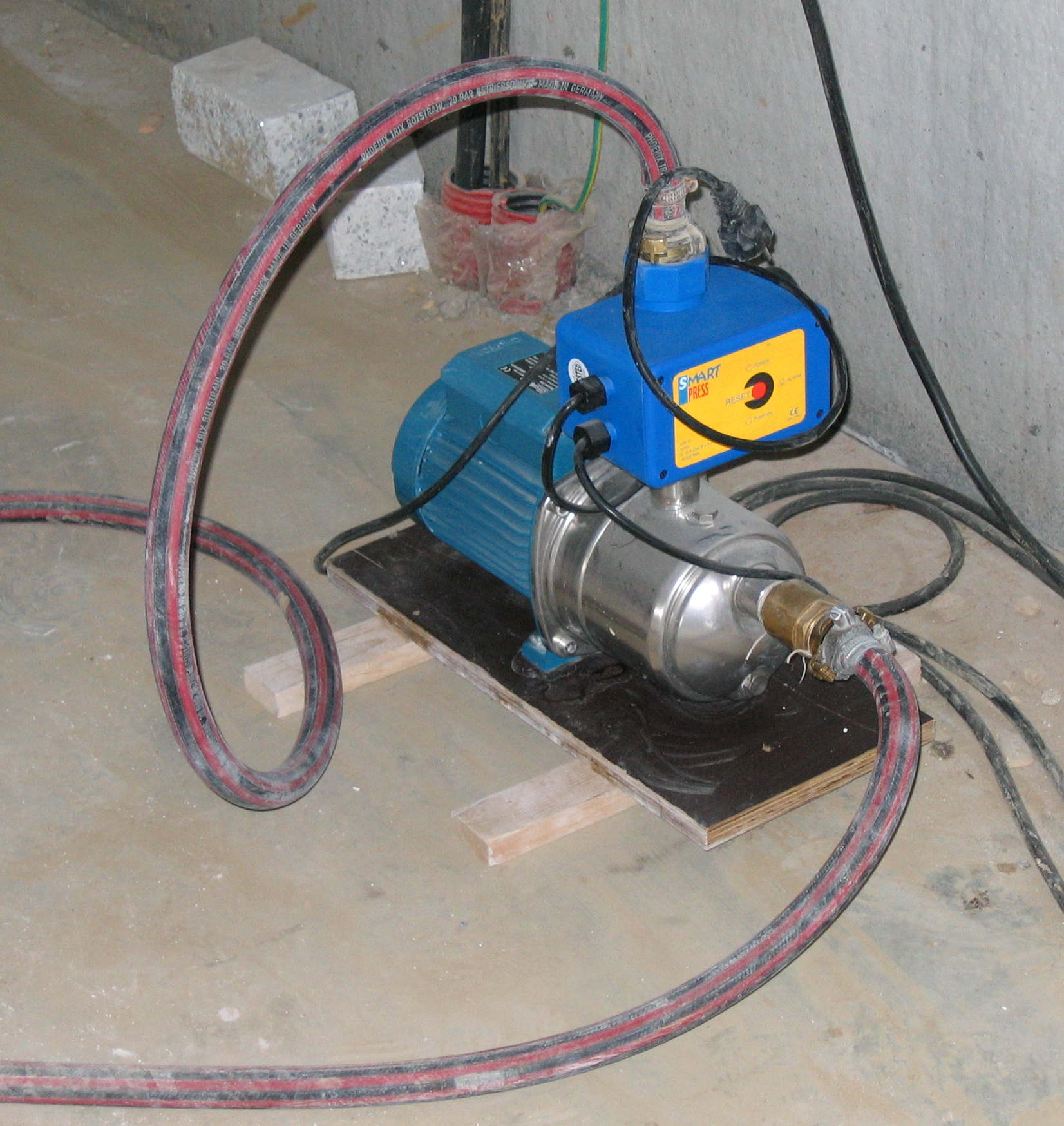
A water pump

The gallon per watt-hour or (G/Wh) is a formula used to test the efficiency of a pool pump or sump pump.

== California Title 20 ==
California's Appliance Efficiency Regulations were established in 1976 in response to a legislative mandate to reduce California's energy consumption. Through that "Title 20" was born.

Over time with the increase of pools and their complexity, the potential energy savings from residential pool pumps has become huge.

Residential pool pumps were first included in the 2005 Title-20 appliance standards that were adopted at the end of 2005.

California has a limited ability to produce electricity. When California electrical demand exceeds its production capacity the utility companies must purchase electricity, usually form out of state companies at a much higher cost. The cost of building power plants and the environmental issues they bring make it difficult to build power plants quick enough to keep up with California's energy needs. This makes conservation the most feasible and economical solution for the utility companies.

There are approximately 1.5 million pools in California that consume an average of 2,000 watts when running. Those 2,000 watts can be reduced by controlling the size and performance of the pool and spa filter pump.

== How it's calculated ==
G/Wh makes it easy for homeowners and plumbing professionals to quickly determine the energy efficiency of a pump. Simply stated G/Wh links efficiency and performance by illustrating how many gallons of water are pumped using one watt hour of electricity.

To calculate G/Wh, take the gallons per hour (GPH) pumped, divided by the power the pump consumes in watts. GPH/W = G/Wh

== California Title 24 ==
California Code of Regulations (CCR), Title 24, also known as the California Building Standards Code, is a compilation of three types of building standards from three different origins:

- Building standards that have been adopted by state agencies without change from building standards contained in national model codes
- Building standards that have been adopted and adapted from the national model code standards to meet California conditions
- Building standards, authorized by the California legislature, that constitute extensive additions not covered by the model codes that have been adopted to address particular California concerns.

Residential swimming pool standards are included in the 2008 Title-24 building standards. The Energy Commission adopted the 2008 Standards on April 23, 2008, and the Building Standards Commission approved them for publication on September 11, 2008. The 2008 Residential Compliance Manual was adopted by the Commission on December 17, 2008, and the 2008 Non-residential Compliance Manual was adopted January 14, 2009.
