= Sight glass =

Transparent tube which shows the liquid level in a tank

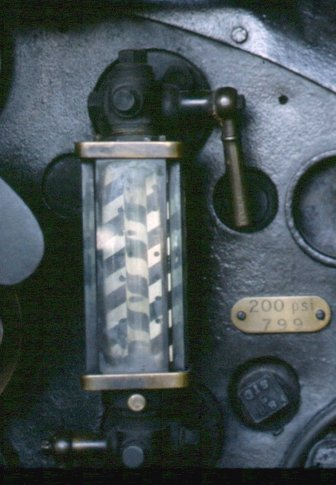
Water gauge on a steam locomotive. Here the water is at the “top nut”, the maximum working level. Note the patterned backplate to help reading and toughened glass shroud.

A sight glass or water gauge is a type of level sensor, a transparent tube through which the operator of a tank or boiler can observe the level of liquid contained within.

== Liquid in tanks ==
Simple sight glasses may be just a plastic or glass tube connected to the bottom of the tank at one end and the top of the tank at the other. The level of liquid in the sight glass will be the same as the level of liquid in the tank. Today, however, sophisticated float switches have replaced sight glasses in many such applications.

== Steam boilers ==
If the liquid is hazardous or under pressure, more sophisticated arrangements must be made. In the case of a boiler, the pressure of the water below and the steam above is equal, so any change in the water level will be seen in the gauge. The transparent tube (the “glass” itself) may be mostly enclosed within a metal or toughened glass shroud to prevent it from being damaged through scratching or impact and offering protection to the operators in the case of breakage. This usually has a patterned backplate to make the magnifying effect of the water in the tube more obvious and so allow for easier reading. In some locomotives where the boiler is operated at very high pressures, the tube itself would be made of metal-reinforced toughened glass. It is important to keep the water at the specified level, otherwise the top of the firebox will be exposed, creating an overheat hazard and causing damage and possibly catastrophic failure.

To check that the device is offering a correct reading and the connecting pipes to the boiler are not blocked by scale, the water level needs to be “bobbed” by quickly opening the taps in turn and allowing a brief spurt of water through the drain cock.

The National Board of Boiler and Pressure Vessel Inspectors recommends a daily testing procedure described by the American National Standards Institute, chapter 2 part I-204.3 water level gauge. While not strictly required, this procedure is designed to allow an operator to safely verify that all parts of the sight glass are operating correctly and have free flowing connections to the boiler necessary for proper operation.

== Failure ==
The gauge glass on a boiler needs to be inspected periodically and replaced if it is seen to have worn thin in the vicinity of the gland nuts, but a failure in service can still occur. Drivers are expected to carry two or three glass tubes, pre-cut to the required length, together with hemp or rubber seals, to replace the tubes on the road. Familiarity with this disquieting occurrence was considered so important that a glass would often be smashed deliberately while a trainee driver was on the footplate, to give him practice in fitting a new tube. Although automatic ball valves are fitted in the mounts to limit the release of steam and scalding water, these can fail through accumulation of limescale. It was standard procedure to hold the coal scoop in front of the face while the other hand, holding the cap for protection, reached to turn off the valves at both ends of the glass.

== Reflex gauges ==
A reflex gauge is more complex in construction but can give a clearer distinction between gas (steam) and liquid (water). Instead of containing the media in a glass tube, the gauge consists of a vertically oriented slotted metal body with a strong glass plate mounted on the open side of the slot facing the operator. The rear of the glass, in contact with the media, has grooves moulded into its surface, running vertically. The grooves form a zig-zag pattern with 90° angles. Incident light entering the glass is refracted at the rear surface in contact with the media. In the region that is contact with the gas, most of the light is reflected from the surface of one groove to the next and back towards the operator, appearing silvery white. In the region that is in contact with the liquid, most of the light is refracted into the liquid causing this region to appear almost black to the operator. Well-known makes of reflex gauge are Clark-Reliance, IGEMA, TGI Ilmadur, Penberthy, Jerguson, Klinger, Cesare-Bonetti and Kenco. Due to the caustic nature of boiler anti-scaling treatments ("water softeners"), reflex gauges tend to become relatively rapidly etched by the water and lose their effectiveness at displaying the liquid level. Therefore, bi-colour gauges are recommended for certain types of boiler, particularly those operating at pressure above 60 bar.

== Bi-colour gauges ==
A bi-colour gauge is generally preferred for caustic media in order to afford protection to the glass. The gauge consists of a vertically oriented slotted metal body with a strong plain glass to the front and the rear. The front and rear body surfaces are in non-parallel vertical planes. Behind the gauge body are light sources with two quite different wavelengths, typically red and green. Due to the different refraction of the red and green light, the liquid region appears green to the operator, while the gas region appears red. Unlike the reflex gauge, the glass has a plane surface which it does not need to be in direct contact with the media and can be protected with a layer of a caustic-resistant transparent material such as silica. Well-known manufacturers of the highest quality Bi-Colour Level Gauges are Clark-Reliance, Klinger, FPS-Aquarian, IGEMA and Quest-Tec

== Magnetic indicator ==
In a magnetic indicator is a float on the surface of the liquid contains a permanent magnet. The liquid is contained in a chamber of strong, non-magnetic material, avoiding the use of glass. The level indicator consists of a number of pivoting magnetic vanes arranged one above the other and placed close to the chamber containing the float. The two faces of the vanes are differently coloured. As the magnet passes up and down behind the vanes it cause them to rotate, displaying one colour for the region containing the liquid and another for the region containing gas. Magnetic indicators are stated in various manufacturers' literature to be most suitable for very high pressure and / or temperature and for aggressive liquids.

== History ==
The first locomotive to be fitted with the device was built in 1829 by John Rastrick at his Stourbridge works.

== Modern industrial sight glass ==
Industrial observational instruments have changed with industry itself. More structurally sophisticated than the water gauge, the contemporary sight glass — also called the sight window or sight port — can be found on the media vessel at chemical plants and in other industrial settings, including pharmaceutical, food, beverage and bio gas plants. Sight glasses enable operators to visually observe processes inside tanks, pipes, reactors and vessels.

The modern industrial sight glass is a glass disk held between two metal frames, which are secured by bolts and gaskets, or the glass disc is fused to the metal frame during manufacture. The glass used for this purpose is either soda lime glass or borosilicate glass, and the metal, usually a type of stainless steel, is chosen for desired properties of strength. Borosilicate glass is superior to other formulations in terms of chemical corrosion resistance and temperature tolerance, as well as transparency.

Fused sight glasses are also called mechanically prestressed glass, because the glass is strengthened by compression of the metal ring. Heat is applied to a glass disc and its surrounding steel ring, causing a fusion of the materials. As the steel cools, it contracts, compressing the glass and making it resistant to tension. Because glass typically breaks under tension, mechanically prestressed glass is unlikely to break and endanger workers. The strongest sight glasses are made with borosilicate glass, because of the greater difference in its coefficient of expansions.

== See also ==
- Fuel gauge
- Fusible plug
