= Fuel gauge =

Instrument indicating volume in a fuel tank

In automotive and aerospace engineering, a fuel gauge is an instrument used to indicate the amount of fuel in a fuel tank. In electrical engineering, the term is used for ICs determining the current State of Charge of accumulators.

== Motor vehicles ==
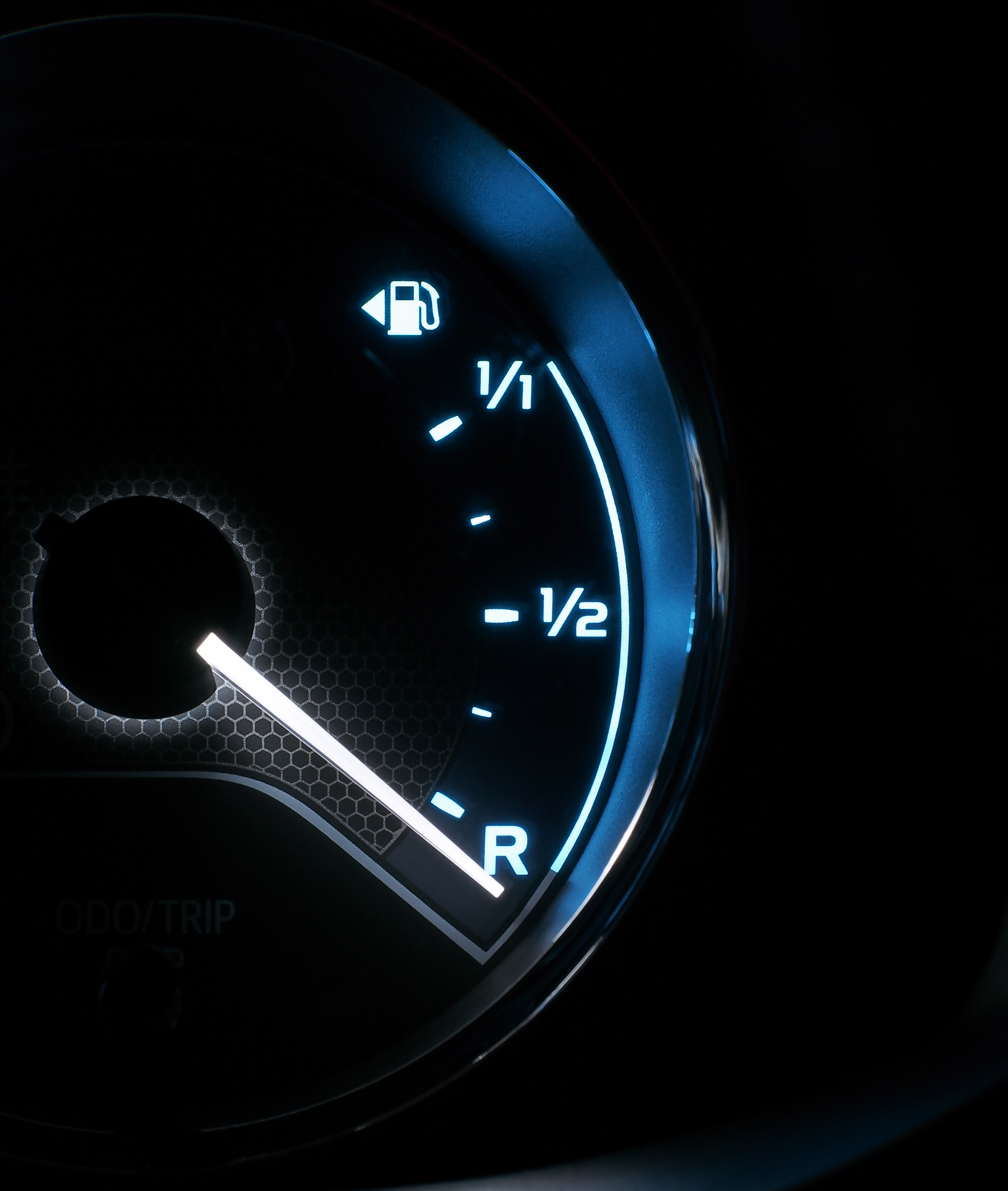
An analog fuel gauge in a 2016 Toyota Corolla featuring a "Moylan Arrow" indicating a fuel filler on the left side of the vehicle.

As used in vehicles, the gauge consists of two parts:

- The sending unit - in the tank
- The indicator - on the dashboard

The sending unit usually uses a float connected to a potentiometer, typically printed ink design in a modern automobile. As the tank empties, the float drops and slides a moving contact along the resistor, increasing its resistance. In addition, when the resistance is at a certain point, it will also turn on a "low fuel" light on some vehicles.

Meanwhile, the indicator unit (usually mounted on the dashboard) is measuring and displaying the amount of electric current flowing through the sending unit. When the tank level is high and maximum current is flowing, the needle points to "F" indicating a full tank. When the tank is empty and the least current is flowing, the needle points to "E" indicating an empty tank; some vehicles use the indicators "1" (for full) and "0" (for empty) or "R" (for reserve) instead.

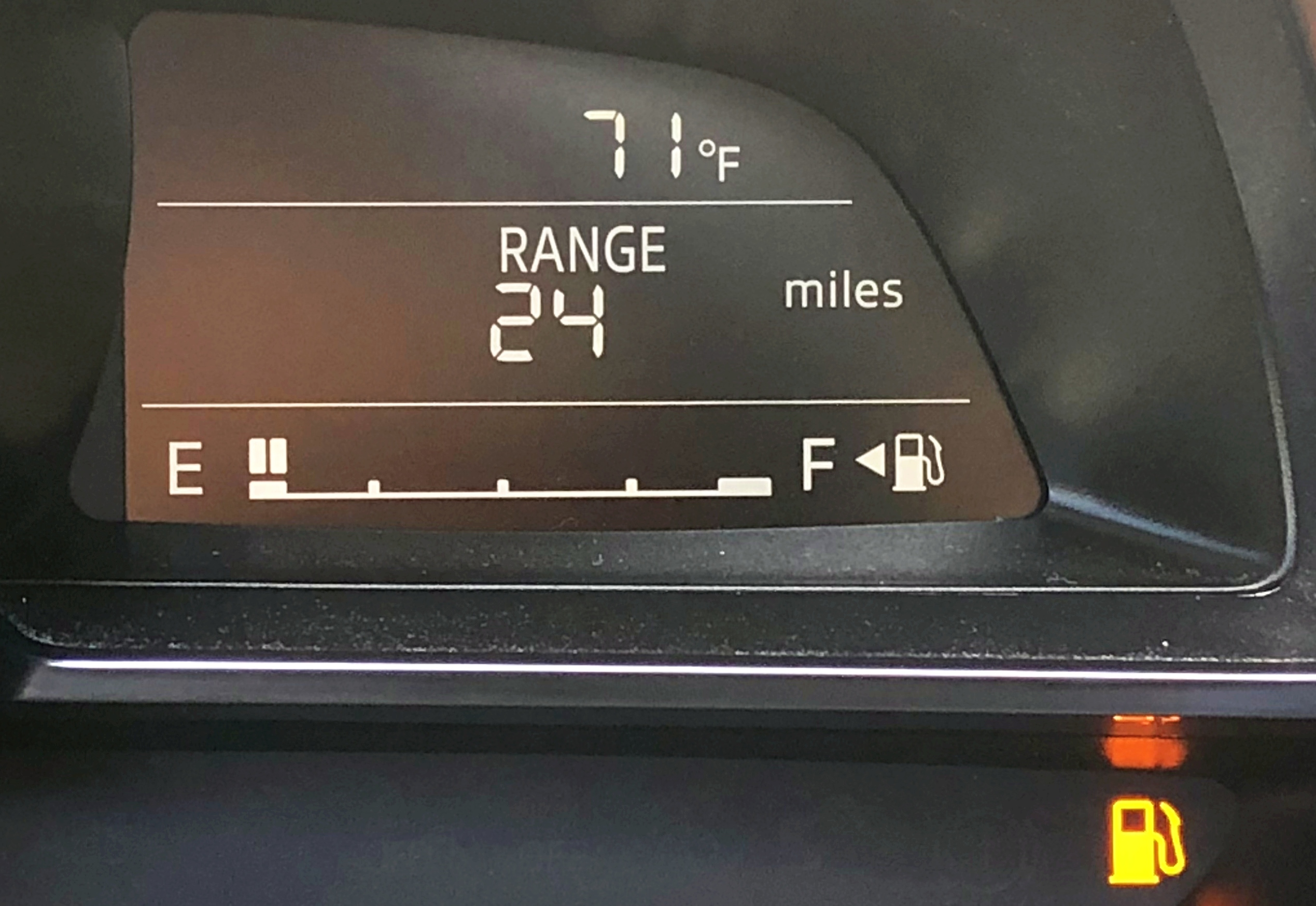
The digital fuel gauge in a 2018 Mazda 3 showing a nearly-empty tank along with a distance to empty display.

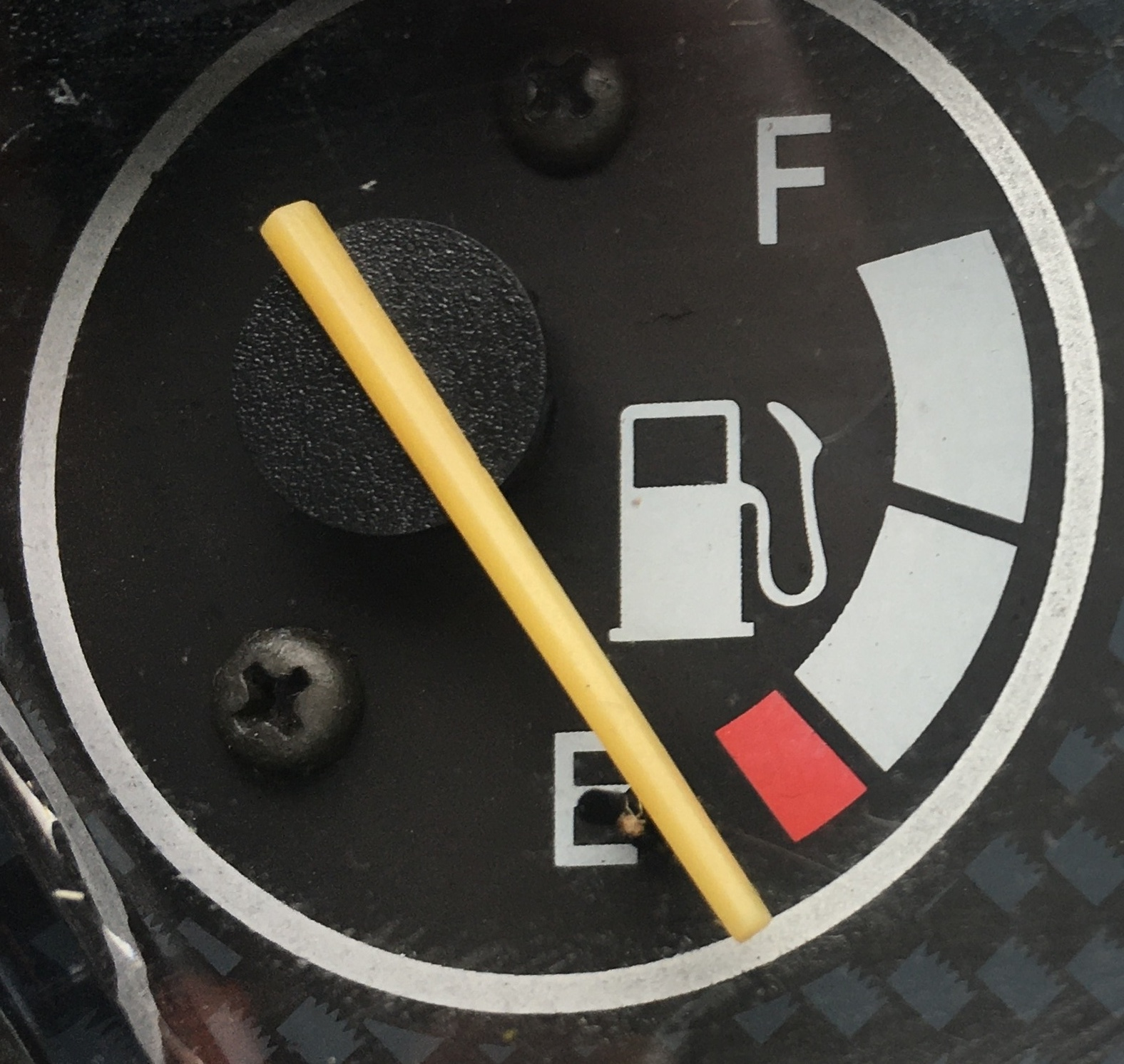
Typical old-style fuel gauge on a 50 ccm chinese-made scooter from 2008, with the internationally used pictogram of a gas pump

The system can be fail-safe. If an electrical fault opens, the electrical circuit causes the indicator to show the tank as being empty (theoretically provoking the driver to refill the tank) rather than full (which would allow the driver to run out of fuel with no prior notification). Corrosion or wear of the potentiometer will provide erroneous readings of fuel level. However, this system has a potential risk associated with it. An electric current is sent through the variable resistor to which a float is connected, so that the value of resistance depends on the fuel level. In most automotive fuel gauges such resistors are on the inward side of the gauge, i.e., inside the fuel tank. Sending current through such a resistor has a fire hazard and an explosion risk associated with it. These resistance sensors are also showing an increased failure rate with the incremental additions of alcohol in automotive gasoline fuel. Alcohol increases the corrosion rate at the potentiometer, as it is capable of carrying current like water. Potentiometer applications for alcohol fuel use a pulse-and-hold methodology, with a periodic signal being sent to determine fuel level decreasing the corrosion potential. Therefore, demand for another safer, non-contact method for fuel level is desired.

=== Moylan arrow ===
Since the early 1990s, many fuel gauges have included an icon with a fuel pump and an arrow, indicating the side of the vehicle on which the fuel filler is located. The use of the icon and arrow was invented in 1986 by Jim Moylan, a designer for Ford Motor Company. After he proposed the idea in April 1986, the 1989 Ford Escort and Mercury Tracer were the first vehicles to see it implemented. Other automotive companies noticed the addition and began to incorporate it into their own fuel gauges.

== Aircraft ==
Magnetoresistance type fuel level sensors, introduced to small aircraft in 2002, measure the quantity of fuel in a tank with no electrical items or electrical power in contact with the liquid fuel inside the tank. This was motivated to prevent losses caused by electrical equipment inside the fuel tank initiating an explosion. A magnetoresistive sensor measures changes to a magnetic field related to the position of a float indicating the amount of fuel remaining.

These fuel level sensors work similar to the potentiometer example, however a sealed detector at the float pivot determines the angular position of a magnet pair at the pivot end of the float arm. These are highly accurate, and the electronics are completely outside the fuel. The non-contact nature of these sensors address the fire and explosion hazard, and also the issues related to any fuel combinations or additives to gasoline or to any alcohol fuel mixtures. Magneto resistive sensors are suitable for all fuel or fluid combinations, including LPG and LNG. The fuel level output for these senders can be ratiometric voltage or preferable CAN bus digital. These sensors also fail-safe in that they either provide a level output or nothing.

Systems that measure large fuel tanks (including underground storage tanks) may use the same electro-mechanical principle or may make use of a pressure sensor, sometimes connected to a mercury manometer.

Many large transport aircraft use a different fuel gauge design principle. An aircraft may use a number (around 30 on an A320) of low voltage tubular capacitor probes where the fuel becomes the dielectric. At different fuel levels, different values of capacitance are measured and therefore the level of fuel can be determined. In early designs, the profiles and values of individual probes were chosen to compensate for fuel tank shape and aircraft pitch and roll attitudes. In more modern aircraft, the probes tend to be linear (capacitance proportional to fuel height) and the fuel computer works out how much fuel there is (slightly different on different manufacturers). This has the advantage that a faulty probe may be identified and eliminated from the fuel calculations. In total this system can be more than 99% accurate. Since most commercial aircraft only take on board fuel necessary for the intended flight (with appropriate safety margins), the system allows the fuel load to be preselected, causing the fuel delivery to be shut off when the intended load has been taken on board.

== Marine ==
Marine fuel gauges measure the amount of fuel in one or more tanks, usually by monitoring a fuel level sender mounted in each tank. Modern marine fuel gauges are designed to monitor one of a variety of sender types:

Resistive float senders
Traditional mechanical float and variable resistor. There are several resistance standards, the gauge and sender must be compatible.

Standard	Empty	Full	Region	North American (US)	240 Ω	33 Ω	North America
European	0 Ω	180 Ω	Europe				
0–90 Ω	0 Ω	90 Ω	Performance Applications				

Capacitive senders
Measure changes in electrical capacitance as fuel level changes.

Ultrasonic senders
Measure the distance between the sensor and fuel surface.

Digital/NMEA 2000 senders
Provide fuel-level information over a digital marine network.

== Fuel Gauge ICs ==
In electronics there are different ICs available, which control the current State of Charge of accumulators. These devices are also called "Fuel Gauge".

== See also ==
- Float switch
- List of auto parts
- List of vehicle instruments
- Sight glass
- Ammeter
