= List of vehicle instruments =

A vehicle instrument is an instrument that measures some parameters in the vehicle, often found on its control panel or dashboard.

== Types ==
- Speedometer
- Tachometer
- Odometer
- Trip odometer
- Oil pressure gauge
- Coolant Temperature gauge
- Battery/Charging system lamp
- Low oil pressure lamp
- Airbag lamp
- Coolant overheat lamp
- Hand-brake lamp
- Door ajar lamp
- High beam lamp
- On-board diagnosis indicator/Check engine lamp
- Fuel gauge
- Low fuel lamp
- Hand brake indicator
- Turn light
- Engine service indicator
- Seat belt indicator

== See also ==
- List of auto parts
