= Basement waterproofing =

Prevention of water infiltration in basements

Basement waterproofing involves techniques and materials used to prevent water from penetrating the basement of a house or a building. Waterproofing a basement that is below ground level can require the application of sealant materials, the installation of drains and sump pumps, and more.

== Purpose ==
Waterproofing is usually required by building codes for structures that are built at or below ground level. Waterproofing and drainage considerations are especially important in cases where ground water is likely to build up in the soil or where there is a high water table.

Water in the soil causes hydrostatic pressure to be exerted underneath basement floors and walls. This hydrostatic pressure can force water in through cracks, which can cause major structural damage as well as mold, decay, and other moisture-related problems.

== Methods ==
Several measures exist to prevent water from penetrating a basement foundation or to divert water that has penetrated a foundation:

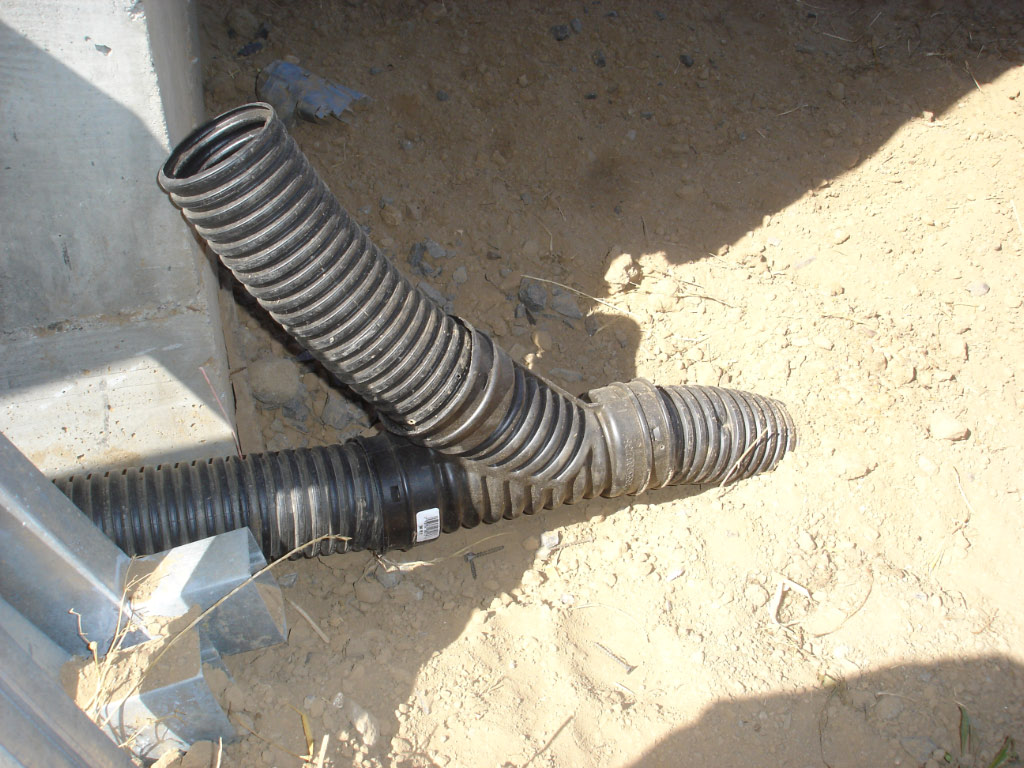
- French drain
  Interior wall and floor sealers
- Interior water drainage
- Exterior drainage
- Exterior waterproofing coatings
- Box type waterproofing
- Foundation crack injections
- French drains
- Sump pump

== Interior sealants ==
In poured concrete foundations, cracks and pipe penetrations are the most common entry points for seepage. These openings can be sealed from the interior. Epoxies, which are strong adhesives, or urethanes can be pressure injected into the openings, thus penetrating the foundation through to the exterior and cutting off the path of the seepage.

In masonry foundations, interior sealers will not provide permanent protection from water infiltration where hydrostatic pressure is present. However, interior sealers are good for preventing high atmospheric humidity inside the basement from absorbing into the porous masonry and causing spalling. Spalling is a condition where constant high humidity or moisture breaks down masonry surfaces, causing deterioration and shedding of the concrete surfaces.

Other coatings can be effective where condensation is the main source of wetness. It is also effective if the problem has minor dampness. Usually, interior waterproofing will not stop major leaks.

== Interior water drainage ==
Although interior water drainage is not technically waterproofing, it is a widely accepted technique in mitigating basement water and is generally referred to as a basement waterproofing solution. Many interior drainage systems are patented and recognized by Building Officials and Code Administrators(BOCA) as being effective in controlling basement water.

A common system for draining water that has penetrated a basement involves creating a channel around the perimeter of the basement alongside the foundation footers. A French drain, PVC pipe, or other drainage system is installed in the newly made channel. The installed drain is covered with new cement.

The drainage system collects any water entering the basement and drains it to an internally placed sump pump system, which will then pump the water out of the basement. The Federal Emergency Management Agency (FEMA) recommends basement waterproofing with a water alarm and "battery-operated backup pump" as a preventive measure against the high cost of flooding. Wall conduits (such as dimple boards or other membranes) are fastened to the foundation wall and extend over the new drainage to guide any moisture down into the system.

== Exterior waterproofing ==
Waterproofing a structure from the exterior is the only method the U.S. International Building Code (IBC) recognizes as adequate to prevent structural damage caused by water intrusion.

Waterproofing an existing basement begins with excavating to the bottom sides of the footings. Once excavated, the walls are then power washed and allowed to dry. The dry walls are sealed with a waterproofing membrane, and new drainage tiles (weeping tiles) are placed at the side of the footing.

A French drain, PVC pipe, or other drainage system is installed and water is led further from the basement.

=== Polymer ===
Over the past ten years, polymer-based waterproofing products have been developed. Polymer-based products last for the lifetime of the building and are not affected by soil pH. Polymer-based waterproofing materials can be sprayed directly onto a wall, are very fast curing, and are semi-flexible, allowing for some movement of the substrate.

== Causes of water seepage and leaks ==
Water seepage in basement and crawl spaces usually occurs over long periods of time and can be caused by numerous factors.

- Concrete is one of the most commonly used materials in home construction. When pockets of air are not removed during construction, or the mixture is not allowed to cure properly, the concrete can crack, which allows water to force its way through the wall.
- Foundations (footings) are horizontal pads that define the perimeter of foundation walls. When footings are too narrow or are not laid deep enough, they are susceptible to movement caused by soil erosion.
- Gutters and downspouts are used to catch rain water as it falls and to discharge it away from houses and buildings. When gutters are clogged or downspouts are broken, rainwater is absorbed by the soil near the foundation, increasing hydrostatic pressure.
- Weeping tile is a porous plastic drain pipe installed around the perimeter of the house. The main purpose of external weeping tile is preventing water from getting into a basement. However, these pipes can become clogged or damaged, which causes excess water to put pressure on internal walls and basement floors.
- Water build up inside window wells, after heavy rain or snow, can lead to leaks through basement window seams. Window well covers can be used to prevent water from accumulating in the window well.
- Ground saturation is another common form of basement leaks. When the footing drain fails the ground around the basement can contain too much water and when the saturation point is met flooding can occur.

== Warning signs of water damage ==
Signs that water is seeping into a basement or crawlspace often take years to develop and may not be easily visible. Over time, multiple signs of damage may become evident and could lead to structural failure.

- Cracked walls: Cracks may be horizontal, vertical, diagonal or stair-stepped. Severe pressure or structural damage is evident by widening cracks.
- Buckling walls: Usually caused by hydrostatic pressure. Walls appear to be bowed inward.
- Peeling paint: Water seeping through walls may lead to bubbling or peeling paint along basement walls.
- Efflorescence: White, powdery residue found on basement walls near the floor.
- Mold: Fungi that usually grow in damp, dark areas and can cause respiratory problems after prolonged exposure.

== Foundation crack injections ==
Foundation crack injections are used when poured concrete foundations crack, either from settlement or the expansion and contraction of the concrete. Epoxy crack injections are typically used for structural purposes while hydrophobic or hydrophilic polyurethane injections are used to seal cracks to prevent penetration of moisture or water. Concrete is both strong and inexpensive, making it an ideal product in construction. However, concrete is not waterproof.
