= Float switch =

Level sensor

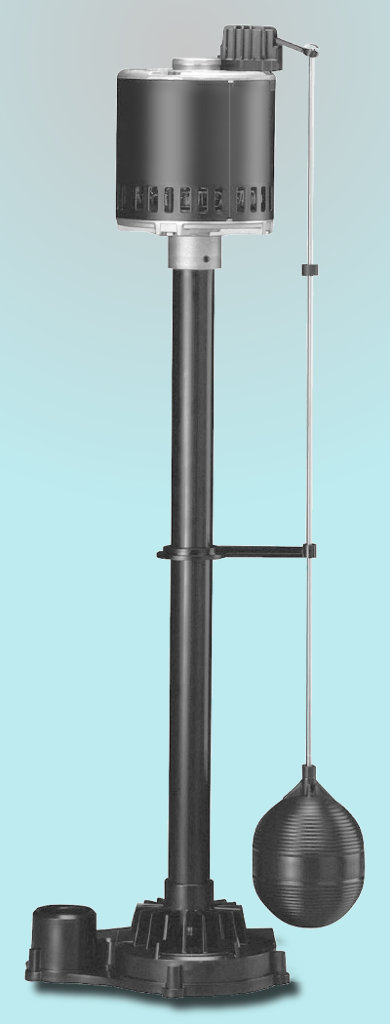
A pedestal sump pump with a float switch

A float switch is a type of level sensor, a device used to detect the level of liquid within a tank. The switch may be used to control a pump, as an indicator, an alarm, or to control other devices.

One type of float switch uses a mercury switch inside a hinged float. Another common type is a float that raises a rod to actuate a microswitch. One pattern uses a reed switch mounted in a tube; a float, containing a magnet, surrounds the tube and is guided by it. When the float raises the magnet to the reed switch, it closes. Several reeds can be mounted in the tube for different level indications by one assembly.

Opened float switch from a sump pump

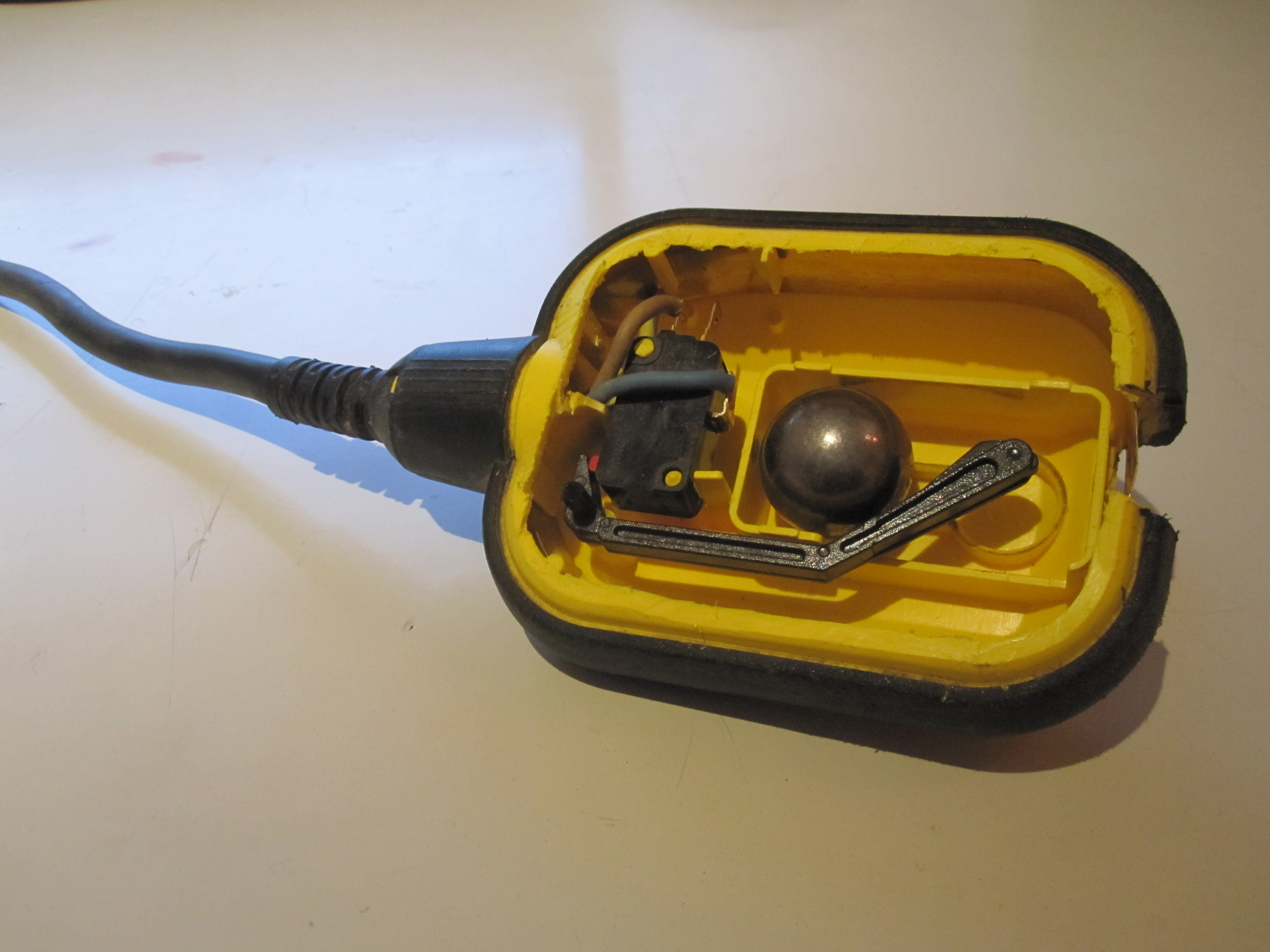
float switch on

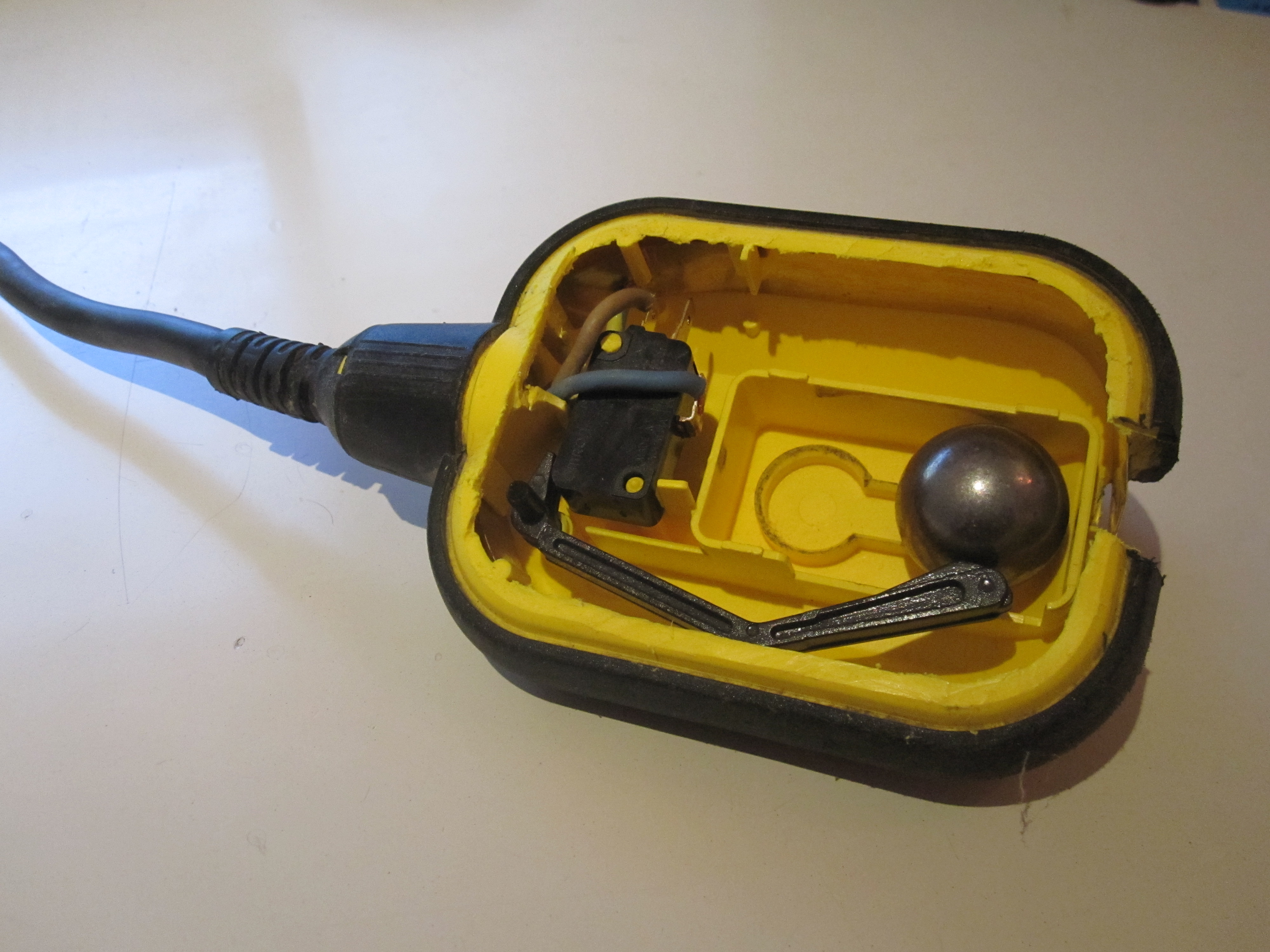
float switch off

A very common application is in sump pumps and condensate pumps where the switch detects the rising level of liquid in the sump or tank and energizes an electrical pump which then pumps liquid out until the level of the liquid has been substantially reduced, at which point the pump is switched off again. Float switches are often adjustable and can include substantial hysteresis. That is, the switch's "turn on" point may be much higher than the "shut off" point. This minimizes the on-off cycling of the associated pump.

Some float switches contain a two-stage switch. As liquid rises to the trigger point of the first stage, the associated pump is activated. If the liquid continues to rise (perhaps because the pump has failed or its discharge is blocked), the second stage will be triggered. This stage may switch off the source of the liquid being pumped, trigger an alarm, or both.

Where level must be sensed inside a pressurized vessel, often a magnet is used to couple the motion of the float to a switch located outside the pressurized volume. In some cases, a rod through a stuffing box can be used to operate a switch, but this creates high drag and has a potential for leakage. Successful float switch installations minimize the opportunity for accumulation of dirt on the float that would impede its motion. Float switch materials are selected to resist the deleterious effects of corrosive process liquids. In some systems, a properly selected and sized float can be used to sense the interface level between two liquids of different density.

== Selection ==
Different types of applications require different float switches. For mechanical and magnetic switches, they can differ in size, material, mounting orientation, number and more. When considering what size and density float switch is needed for a certain application, viscosity and temperature need to be taken into account. This is because the buoyancy of a float is dependent on density of the liquid and the size and density of the float itself. The density of the liquid depends on two things: the characteristics of that liquid and the temperature. So a float will be needed that has the required size and density to float in the given liquid for a wide range of temperatures. Picking the right density can also allow for the float to sink in one liquid and float in another such as a float being used to measure the relative levels of oil and water.

Another part to consider when choosing a float switch is how the material of the float will respond directly with the liquid. This means taking into account temperatures and chemicals the float will be exposed to. Because of this, different materials are used depending on the application. 316 Stainless steel is a material that is used when the float is in conditions that are high temperature, high corrosion, high pressure. Buna-Nitrile floats are often used in oil applications including petroleum, lubrication, and hydraulics. Polypropylene floats are commonly used for extreme pH conditions and lower temperatures commonly found in food application. Finally, kynar floats are known for their tolerance to harsh chemicals, also commonly found in food applications.

Finally, a float switch can have different orientations based on its use, either being vertically mounted from the top of the apparatus or being side mounted, where vertically mounted switches have the possibility to have more than one float so as to allow multiple setpoints.

== Applications ==
Pumps use float switches to indicate whether or not the pump needs to continue to pump liquid or shut off, depending on where the liquid level is. When the float reaches a low enough level, the circuit is closed and liquid gets pumped in. When the float reaches a certain level, the pump turns off again. This specific application is frequently used in sump pumps.

Another application these float switches can be used in is in a boiler. Here, the different types of switches that can be used are bellows-sealed horizontally mounted float switches, magnetic actuated float switches, or float switches that utilize a packed traverse shaft. By using a bellows with a float switch, the float can move freely while the electrical components can be kept safe from the water or steam of the boiler. In a magnet actuated float switch, there is a float that changes position based on the level of the liquid, and then there are external switches that are activated as the magnet attached to the float changes position, allowing for multiple setpoints. This means that with a magnet actuated switch, more information can be gained on where the level of the liquid is.

Although some float switches can be used to alarm when levels get too high, they can also be used when levels get too low. This is called a Float Type Low Water Cutoff Switch. Commonly used in gas and oil burners, these particular float switches float with the liquid and then when the liquid drops, so does the float, triggering a response depending on the application and in the case of a gas or oil burner, it would trigger the burner to shut off.

== Placement ==
In order to use a float switch to its fullest capacity, it must be initially hung or installed at the correct height so as to allow the switch to activate at the correct time. In cases where there are many obstacles to this, such as debris and foam in the liquid or the possibility of the float having too much freedom of movement within the tank, a specific placement of the float switch must be used. One solution is to place the float in a stilling well. Here, the float can still be affected by the changing level of the liquid being measured while at the same time not being affected by turbulence or excessive debris in the main tank.

== Maintenance ==
Different applications have problems that could arise. In boilers used for heating, one problem that users need to prevent is leakage For this specific application, where the float switch is being used as a cutoff switch, the electronics are level with the water level for a large amount of time. This means that if there is a leak in the seal separating the float from the microswitch and electrical components, the electrical components will be harmed due to water damage. To prevent this, routine preventative maintenance is heavily recommended.

== See also ==
- Float (liquid level)
- Fuel gauge
- Level sensor
- Sight glass
