= Maceration (sewage) =

Process of reducing solids to small pieces

Maceration, in sewage treatment, is the use of a machine that reduces solids to small pieces in order to deal with rags and other solid waste. Macerating toilets use a grinding or blending mechanism to reduce human waste to a slurry, which can then be moved by pumping. This is useful when, for example, water pressure is low or one wishes to install a toilet below the sanitary sewer. Maceration can be achieved by using a chopper pump in the sewage lift station or at the wastewater treatment plant.

When the flush is triggered, wastewater flows into the macerator, and when the water level rises, pressure activates the unit, causing the stainless steel blades to rotate at 3,600 rpm, pulverizing the wastewater into fine particles. When this process is complete, the wastewater is pumped to a soil stack or septic tank through a single small diameter pipe (¾ inch or 1 inch) that is much easier to install on site.

Macerator maintenance includes regular cleaning and inspection to prevent plaque and clogging. Only toilet paper and human waste should be flushed down the drain; even items labeled "flushable" can cause problems.

Macerator toilets have become more common in mobile homes.

== In Antarctica ==
At Antarctic research stations with an average summer population of more than 30 people, maceration is the minimum treatment level required before sewage can be disposed of in the sea. This procedure is outlined in the Madrid Protocol, an international treaty outlining environmental practices to be followed in Antarctica. Research stations that do not meet this population threshold are allowed to dump untreated, unmacerated sewage directly into the sea. The treaty also allows ships to discharge macerated wastewater (including sewage and food waste) directly into the sea, provided that the vessel is more than 12 nautical miles from shore.

== See also ==
- Maceration (cooking)
