= Chopper pump =

Pumping device that allows chopping of solids

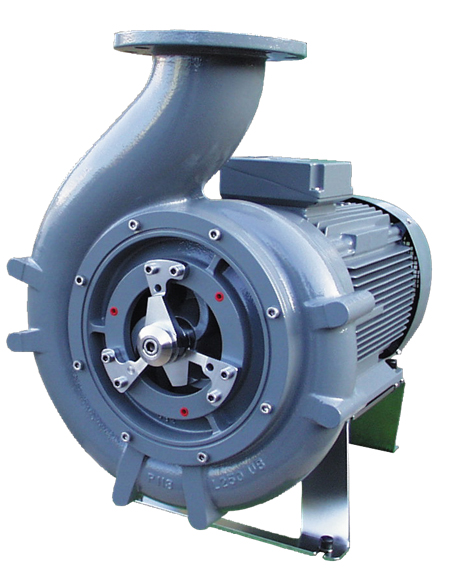
Picture of a dry-installed chopper pump, model MPTK-I

A chopper pump is a centrifugal pump which is equipped with a cutting system to facilitate chopping or maceration of solids that are present in the pumped liquid. The main advantage of this type of pump is that it prevents clogging of the pump itself and of the adjacent piping, as all the solids and stringy materials are macerated by the chopping system. Chopper pumps exist in various configurations, including submersible and dry-installed design and they are typically equipped with an electric motor to run the impeller and to provide torque for the chopping system. Due to its high solids handling capabilities, the chopper pump is often used for pumping sewage, sludge, manure slurries, and other liquids that contain large or tough solids.

== History ==
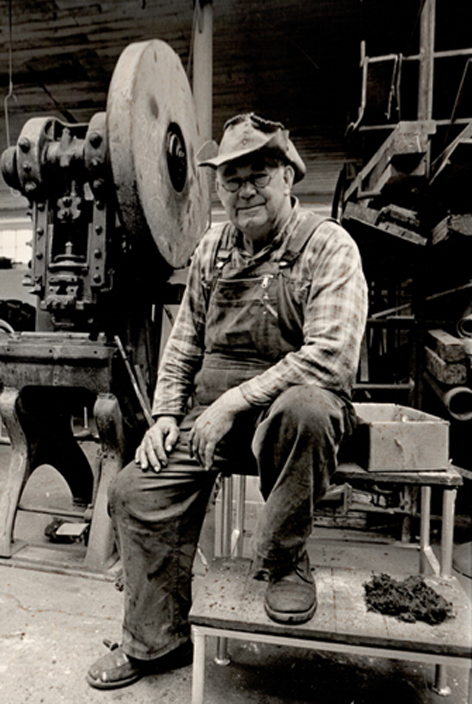
The inventor of the chopper pump, Christian Ølgaard

The chopper pump was invented in 1950 by the Danish company Landia. The pump manufacturer, Christian Ølgaard, developed a pump with a special knife system to meet the need for macerating and pumping manure in agricultural applications. Manure with high solids content, containing straw and sawdust, would clog up other types of pumps, causing unstable operation in an environment which required high reliability.

As the need for the pumping of difficult media expanded to other industries, so did the use of the chopper pump in both dry and submersible applications and in various industries, including meat, paper and food processing, as well as the automobile industry, biogas, chemical plants, municipal wastewater and prison lift stations.

== Working principle ==
A chopper pump is operated by a drive unit (e.g. electric motor, hydraulic motor, power takeoff (PTO)), which turns the impeller and the cutting system. An open impeller design is used to successfully pass the macerated solids or thick slurry. A set of hardened steel cutters is installed externally to the pump suction in order to macerate all solids prior to entering the hydraulic parts of the pump. A chopper pump should not be confused with a grinder pump, which uses its impeller as part of the cutting mechanism. Grinder pumps are typically used for light weight sewage applications, whereas chopper pumps are used for tough solids handling applications.

The chopping system consists of a set of rotating cutters that are keyed to the shaft and work in conjunction with the stationary cutters, which are bolted to the suction plate. A system of mechanical seals are used to prevent the pumped liquid from entering the motor. The pump can either be connected to a pipe, flexible hose or lowered down a guide rail so that the pump sits on a coupling foot (aka base elbow), thereby connecting it to the discharge pipe.

== Applications ==
Examples of applications where chopper pumps are commonly applied include:

- Scum pumping at wastewater treatment plants
- Sewage wet wells and lift stations; especially sewage containing wet wipes
- Sludge pumping at biogas facilities
- Pumping agricultural manure (dairy, hog and poultry)
- Septage receiving stations
- Waste processing at slaughterhouses, poultry abattoirs, fish processing plants, etc.
- Paper mills / pumping of pulp
- Highway Departments, to spread chopped hay to prevent soil erosion

== See also ==
- Sewage pumping
