= Sewage pumping =

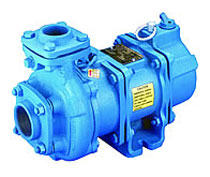
KOS+ M openwell submersible pump

Small-scale sewage pumping is normally done by a submersible pump.

This became popular in the early 1960s, when a guide rail system was developed to lift the submersible pump out of the pump station for repair, and ended the dirty and sometimes dangerous task of sending people into the sewage or wet pit. Growth of the submersible pump for sewage pumping since has been dramatic, as an increasing number of specifiers and developers learned of their advantages.

Three classes of submersible pumps exist:

- Smaller submersible pumps, used in domestic and light commercial applications, normally handle up to 55 millimetres (2.2 in) spherical solids and range from 0.75 to 2.2 kilowatts (1.01 to 2.95 hp).
- Larger submersible pumps, handle 65 millimetres (2.6 in) and larger solids and normally have a minimum of 80 millimetres (3.1 in) discharge. They are generally used in municipal and industrial applications for pumping sewage and all types of industrial waste water.
- Submersible chopper pumps, which are used to handle tougher solids or larger concentrations of solids that conventional sewage pumps cannot handle. Chopper pumps are generally used in municipal and industrial waste water applications and provide clog-free operation by macerating those solids that might clog other types of submersible pumps.

Submersible pumps are normally used in a packaged pump station where drainage by gravity is not possible.

Vertical type sewage pumps have also been used for many years.

== See also ==
- Booster pump
- Pumping station
- Sewage treatment
- Submersible pump cable
