= Maryland's "Rain Tax" =

Stormwater fee in Maryland, United States

Maryland's "rain tax" was implemented in 2012 through the Watershed Protection and Restoration Act to fund stormwater management aiming to reduce the level of pollution in the Chesapeake Bay. This bill, HB 987, utilized a stormwater fee in the ten most urban jurisdictions in Maryland.

== Background ==
The first stormwater fee nationwide was enacted in Washington in 1974. There are now nearly 1,500 jurisdictions with similar policies to address stormwater management. Numerous counties in Maryland have implemented fees and programs to address polluted runoff since the 1980s. In 2010, the U.S. EPA ordered the states in the Chesapeake Bay watershed to reduce stormwater runoff through independent funding methods. Maryland voted to use stormwater fees to cover the $14.8 billion cost.

== The "Rain Tax" ==
The "rain tax" raised revenue to improve the stormwater management system while creating a financial incentive to minimize the construction of and replace current impervious surfaces. Collection of the stormwater fee on impervious surfaces varied from annually on the property tax bill to quarterly on the water bill. The rates and number of square feet used to calculate the Equivalent Residential Unit were set by local officials across the ten jurisdictions to adequately finance the work needed to meet the targets of the Chesapeake Clean Water Blueprint. The revenue collected was used to maintain and repair the stormwater infrastructure to reduce pollution, improve water quality, and enhance the livability of these jurisdictions.

== Outcomes ==
Frederick County adopted an annual tax of one cent in protest, while Carroll County refused to impose any tax. Government agencies sited on properties with impervious surfaces, including the Department of Navy, declined to pay the stormwater fee. State and local governments and volunteer fire departments were exempt whereas churches and non-profit organizations were not. Residents and businesses had the opportunity to participate in stormwater remediation projects to lower their fees. In 2015, revisions eliminated the tax mandate and allowed each jurisdiction to determine whether to impose the tax. These jurisdictions are still required to clean up stormwater pollution and must demonstrate that they have adequate funding and plans to address the issue. Funding must be assigned to a dedicated fund, now financed from the stormwater fee or general revenues. Jurisdictions, including Baltimore City, have chosen to continue to fund stormwater pollution cleanup through the fee.

== See also ==
- Stormwater fee
