= Resin-bound paving =

Paving material

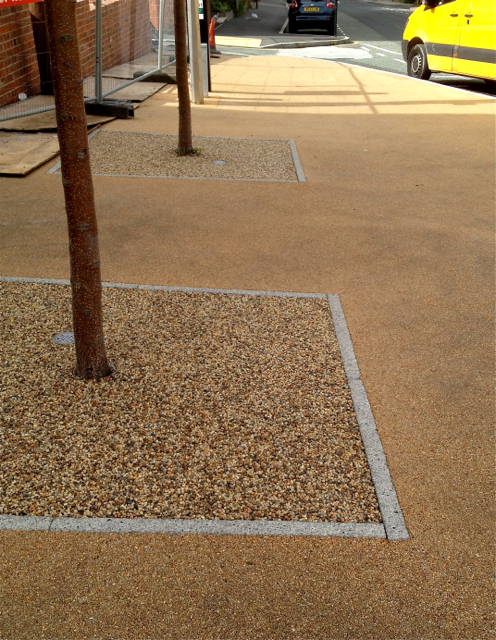
Resin-bound gravel paving

Resin-bound paving is a mixture of aggregate stones and resin used to pave footpaths, driveways, etc. It is a kind of permeable paving solution.

It is a flexible surfacing material, so is resistant to cracking.

== Overview ==
The system is mixed on site and cold applied, using a high-quality clear UV resistant resin binder to coat the aggregate particles prior to laying. Unlike resin-bonded surfacing, where a thin layer of resin is applied to the surface and then the aggregate scattered on top (which can then become loose over time and is impermeable), resin and aggregates are thoroughly mixed together prior to laying, ensuring that the aggregate is completely coated and so providing a totally bound surface. As a result, a resin-bound surface is more durable and requires less maintenance – it needs to be swept or power washed at least twice a year, to avoid the build-up of detritus and prevent the growth of moss or algae.

In the UK Resin-bound surfacing can conform to the guidance notes set out by the Resin Flooring Association (FeRFA).

The quality of the resin-bound surfacing is dependent on a variety of factors.

== Applications ==
In pavements natural aggregate mix blends tested to BS 8204-6:2008+A1:2010 Appendix B for slip resistance will, when installed correctly, provide a slip-resistant, permeable, decorative finish suitable for pedestrian and light vehicular traffic.

Natural aggregate and recycled rubber blends are available from UKAS ISO9001 manufacturers and are suitable for pathways and nature walks where environmental benefits are required from the specifier. The resins available should be UV resistant polyurethanes.

UV resin-bound paving is a fully permeable paving solution which allows water to freely drain through the surface. Meeting the requirements of Sustainable urban drainage systems (SUDS) standards, this helps to prevent standing water and largely eliminates surface water runoff. This may also mitigate the need for planning permission when installing a resin driveway, depending on jurisdiction, as they are permeable.

Resin-bound systems incorporating 6-10mm dried aggregates and larger sizes are generally used as tree surrounds known as tree pits. These are a cost-effective and practical alternative to metal tree grilles that are stolen for scrap value, are costly to purchase and harbour litter thus increasing maintenance costs for local authorities and tax payers. Tree pit systems work in a similar way to UV resin-bound surfacing systems only using larger aggregates to allow more water to permeate through to feed the trees they surround.

Tree Pit systems are generally installed at a depth of 40 to 50 mm, depending on the specification; they have a reduced ratio of 6% UV light stable polyurethane resin to 100 kg kiln dried aggregate.

== Disadvantages ==
Resin bound gravel is particularly sensitive to moisture during the curing process and the presence of water in the mix can cause a reaction in which the polyurethane binder becomes white and bubbles start to form. This issue is quite common but is often due to poor installation practices. Moisture should be completely eliminated from any aggregate used in the mix and the use of kiln-dried sand and gravels is vital to the success and integrity of the surface.

Decorative coloured recycled crushed glass and pigmented quartzes are suitable generally for visual purposes only, as they are susceptible to damage due to having low crush values, and so will become damaged if walked on.

== See also ==
- Sustainable urban drainage systems
- Bioretention
- Bioswale
- Impervious surface
- Permeability (earth sciences)
- Porosity
- Road surface
- Urban runoff
