= Stormwater fee =

Impervious surface taxes

A stormwater fee is a charge imposed on real estate owners for pollution in stormwater drainage from impervious surface runoff.

This system imposes a tax that is proportional to the total impervious area on a particular property, including concrete or asphalt driveways and roofs, that do not allow rain to infiltrate. In other words, the more area covered by impervious surfaces the more stormwater is generated and conveyed to the sewer, so the higher the stormwater fee.

== Germany ==
Equivalence issues were raised concerning the imposition of sewage fees based on the usage of water supply. In 1985, in order to ensure the legal equity of charging based on the polluter pays principle, the German Federal Administrative Court and the local high court ruled that the sewage system charges should be separately collected as usage fees for rainwater exclusion and as usage fees for sewage exclusion. This ruling became a decisive motive to bring about a switch in the sewage system for rainwater in Germany. The German states took legal action to impose a stormwater tax on developers like the builders who made artificial surface in the 1990s. Many resistances were raised, but Berlin, which had been the strongest opponent, has accepted the plan since 2000. About 73 percent of cities with a population of 100,000 or more apply a separate calculation method, which divides the cost of sewage into the rainwater cost. Usually, Germany calculates concrete, asphalt, and building roofs as impervious areas and charges an annual fee of $2.6 per m^{2}. Builders are installing rainfall storage tank and permeation facilities to receive reduction in fees. In addition, outdoor plant cultivation facilities and green business are also proposed as alternatives to the reduction of the stormwater fee.

Germany has seen two effects in this regard : increasing rainwater recycling rates and reducing sewage fee and tap water usage. Rain water recycling plays a great role in preventing the city from flooding in the event of heavy rain and saving energy.

== Italy ==
Such taxes have been collected in regions of Italy, acquiring international attention, and challenging Italian tax morale. Authorities in Ravenna, Italy, have imposed 3% increase on local water bills to maintain and improve drainage systems. Officials cite the severe damage inflicted by the heavy rain on infrastructure, buildings and agriculture in the Po valley, insisting that this money urgently needs to be recouped. The local water board, which wants to backdate the new tax three years, claims that the payments will save it €1 million a year. Gianluca Dradi, head of environmental policy for the Ravenna city council, likened the levy to a street cleaning tax and clarified that those paying more for their water use, such as factories, will pay proportionately more than individual households. "Including the cost in water bills is more equitable," he told the Repubblica newspaper.

However, consumer organisations are opposing the move, and residents have been urged to resist the authorities and refuse to pay the tax.

== United States ==
A 2023 study estimated that at least 2100 stormwater utilities have been established in 42 states and the District of Columbia. Most of the utilities require fees that are applicable to property owners.

=== Maryland ===
The Maryland General Assembly enacted a stormwater management fee program in House Bill 987 (April 2012), which was signed into law by then-governor Martin O'Malley. The law applies to the largest urban jurisdictions in Maryland (nine counties and the City of Baltimore) in order to meet the requirements of the federal Clean Water Act as it concerns the Chesapeake Bay watershed. The Tax Foundation stated that House Bill 987 "was passed in response to a decree by the Environmental Protection Agency (EPA) formally known as the Chesapeake Bay Total Maximum Daily Load, which identified mandatory reductions in nitrogen, phosphorus, and sediment that damage the Chesapeake Bay." The EPA TMDL requirements apply to the states of Maryland, Virginia, New York, Pennsylvania, West Virginia, and the District of Columbia. Polluted runoff is the only source in the Chesapeake Bay watershed that is still increasing, as of 2018. This fee, of course, does not tax rain but has been implemented in Maryland in varying ways at the county level, such as a flat fee per property owner, or based on impervious surface square footage.

The law specifies that accrued funds must be used for specified stormwater pollution-related purposes.

This law was modified in 2015 to make the county-assessed fees optional rather than mandatory while still holding the counties responsible for making progress on managing polluted runoff.

=== Illinois ===
The Illinois General Assembly passed Public Act 98-0335 in August 2013. The law provides DuPage and Peoria counties with the option of charging fees to residents whose property benefits from county stormwater management. HB1522 allows the counties to assess the tax in a nonuniform manner, based on their own rules, exemptions and special considerations. Home rule municipalities in Illinois have always had the ability to establish special fees under their own ordinances.

The city of Elgin, Illinois was planning to assess its Stormwater Utility Tax in 2014, but public opinion and election results led to a decision by the Elgin City Council to unanimously reject the tax.

=== Pennsylvania ===
The city of Pittsburgh issued a stormwater fee requirement, applicable to residential and non-residential property owners, effective in 2022.

=== Virginia ===
To help comply with the Chesapeake Bay TMDL requirements, most large jurisdictions in Virginia have also enacted stormwater fees, including Alexandria, Arlington County, Richmond, Roanoke and Virginia Beach.
