= Stormwater =

Water that originates during precipitation events and snow/ice melt

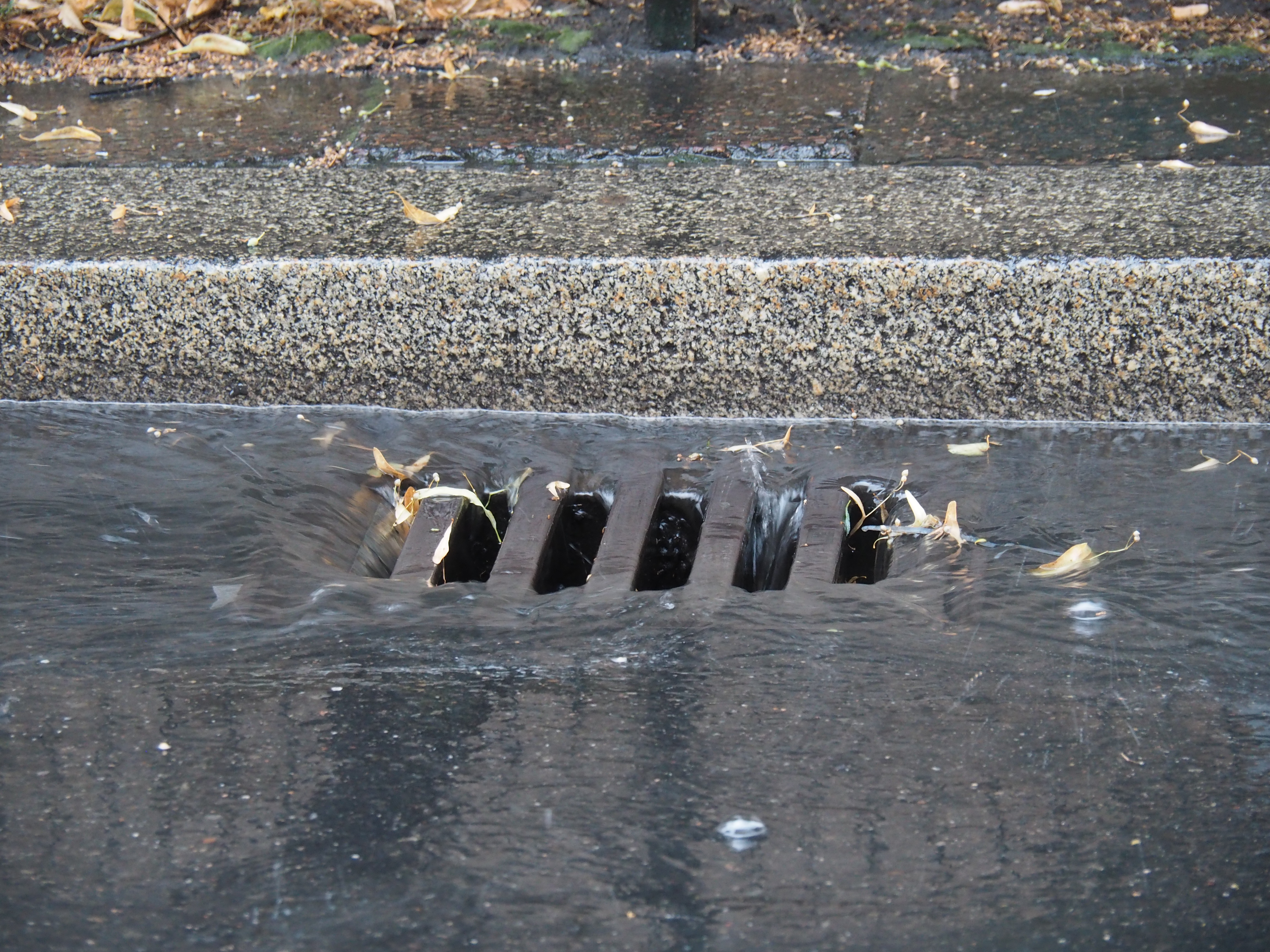
Urban runoff entering a storm drain

Stormwater, also written storm water, is water that originates from precipitation (storm), including heavy rain and meltwater from hail and snow. Stormwater can soak into the soil (infiltrate) and become groundwater, be stored on depressed land surface in ponds and puddles, evaporate back into the atmosphere, or contribute to surface runoff. Most runoff is conveyed directly as surface water to nearby streams, rivers or other large water bodies (wetlands, lakes and oceans) without treatment.

In natural landscapes, such as forests, soil absorbs much of the stormwater. Plants also reduce stormwater by improving infiltration, intercepting precipitation as it falls, and by taking up water through their roots. In developed environments, such as cities, unmanaged stormwater can create two major issues: one related to the volume and timing of runoff (flooding) and the other related to potential contaminants the water is carrying (water pollution). In addition to the pollutants carried in stormwater runoff, urban runoff is being recognized as a cause of pollution in its own right.

Stormwater is also an important resource as human population and demand for water grow, particularly in arid and drought-prone climates. Stormwater harvesting techniques and purification could potentially make some urban environments self-sustaining in terms of water.

Stormwater carrying street bound pollutants to a storm drain for coastal discharge.

== Impacts of stormwater ==
=== Stormwater pollution ===
With less vegetation and more impervious surfaces (parking lots, roads, buildings, compacted soil), developed areas allow less rain to infiltrate into the ground, and more runoff is generated than in undeveloped conditions. Additionally, passages such as ditches and storm sewers quickly transport runoff away from commercial and residential areas into nearby water bodies. This greatly increases the volume of water in waterways and the discharge of those waterways, leading to erosion and flooding. Because the water is flushed out of the watershed during the storm event, little infiltrates the soil, replenishes groundwater, or supplies stream baseflow in dry weather.

A first flush is the initial runoff of a rainstorm. During this phase, polluted water entering storm drains in areas with high proportions of impervious surfaces is typically more concentrated compared to the remainder of the storm. Consequently, these high concentrations of urban runoff result in high levels of pollutants discharged from storm sewers to surface waters.

Daily human activities result in deposition of pollutants on roads, lawns, roofs, farm fields, and other land surfaces. Such pollutants include trash, sediment, nutrients, bacteria, pesticides, metals, and petroleum byproducts. When it rains or there is irrigation, water runs off and ultimately makes its way to a river, lake, or ocean. While there is some attenuation of these pollutants before entering receiving waters, polluted runoff results in large enough quantities of pollutants to impair receiving waters.

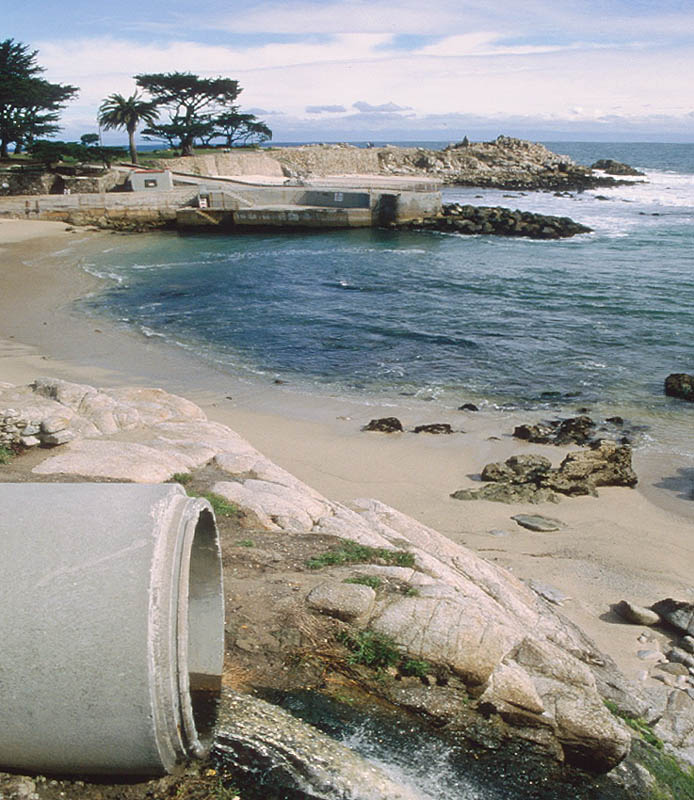
Urban runoff being discharged to coastal waters

=== Stormwater runoff as a source of pollution ===
In addition to the pollutants carried in stormwater runoff, urban runoff is being recognized as a cause of pollution in its own right. In natural catchments (watersheds) surface runoff entering waterways is a relatively rare event, occurring only a few times each year and generally after larger storms. Before land development occurs in a particular area, most rainfall soaks into the ground and contributes to groundwater recharge, or is recycled into the atmosphere by vegetation through evapotranspiration.

Modern drainage systems, which collect runoff from impervious surfaces (e.g., roofs and roads), ensure that water is efficiently moved to waterways through pipe networks, meaning that even small storms result in increased waterway flows.

In addition to delivering higher pollutants from the urban catchment, increased stormwater flow can lead to stream erosion, encourage weed invasion, and alter natural flow regimes. Native species often rely on such flow regimes for spawning, juvenile development, and migration. Stormwater runoff from roadways has been observed to contain many metals including zinc, cadmium, copper, nickel, lead, chromium, manganese, iron, vanadium, cobalt, and aluminum and other constituents.

In some areas, especially along the U.S. coast, polluted runoff from roads and highways may be the largest source of water pollution. For example, about 75 percent of the toxic chemicals getting to Seattle, Washington's Puget Sound are carried by stormwater that runs off paved roads and driveways, rooftops, yards, and other developed land.

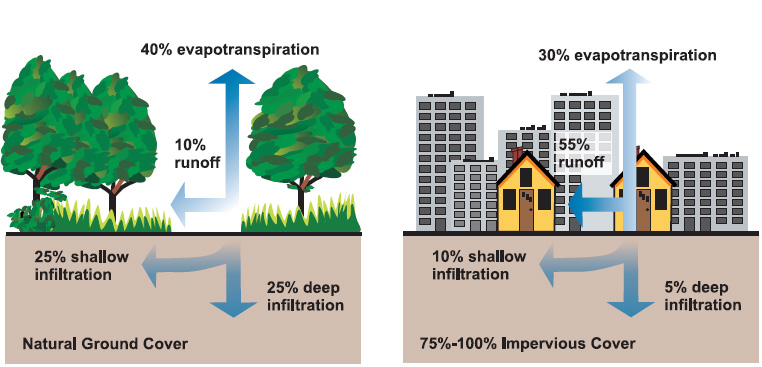
Relationship between impervious surfaces and surface runoff

Industrial stormwater is runoff from precipitation that lands on industrial sites (e.g. manufacturing facilities, mines, airports). This runoff is often polluted by materials that are handled or stored on the sites, and the facilities are subject to regulations to control the discharges.

== Stormwater treatment ==
Stormwater management facilities (SWMF) are generally designed using Stokes' law to allow rudimentary treatment through the settling particulate matter larger than 40 micron in size and to impound water to reduce downstream flooding. However, regulation on the effluent from SWMFs is becoming more stringent. The effect of phosphorus, either dissolved from (fertilizers) or bound to sediment particles from construction or agriculture runoff, causes algae and toxic cyanobacteria (aka Blue-green algae) blooms in receiving lakes. Cyanotoxin is of particular concern as many drinking water treatment plants can not effectively remove this health hazard. In a recent municipal stormwater treatment study, an advanced sedimentation technology was used passively in large diameter stormwater mains upstream of SWMFs to remove an average of 90% of total suspended solids (TSS) and phosphorus during a near 50 year rain event turning a management facility into a passive treatment facility.

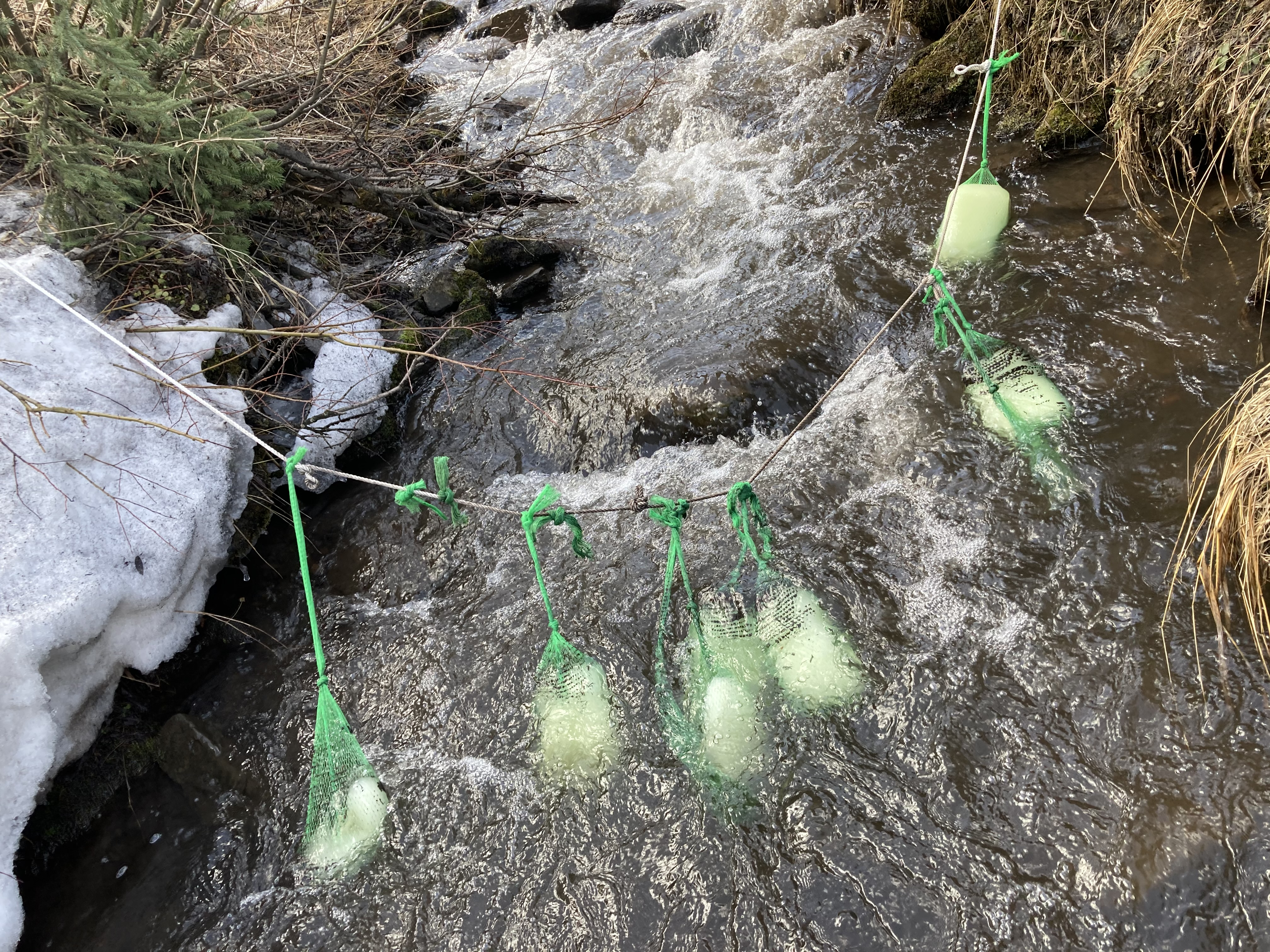
Gel flocculants in a passive mining treatment system

=== Passive treatment systems ===
Chemical treatment of stormwater to remove pollutants can be accomplished without large scale infrastructure improvements. Passive treatment technologies use the energy of water flowing by gravity through ditches, canals, culverts, pipes or other constructed conveyances to enable treatment. Self-dosing products, such as gel flocculants, are placed in the flowing water where sediment particles, colloids and flow energy combine to release the required dosage, thereby creating heavy flocs which can then be easily filtered or settled. Natural woven fibers like jute are often used in ditch bottoms to act as filtration media. Silt retention mats can also be placed in situ to capture floccules. Sedimentation in a forebay is often utilized as a deposition area to clarify the water and concentrate the material. Mining, heavy construction and other industries have used passive systems for more than twenty years. These types of systems are low carbon as no external power source is needed, they require little skill to operate, minimal maintenance and are effective at reducing TSS, some heavy metals and phosphorus.

=== Urban flooding ===
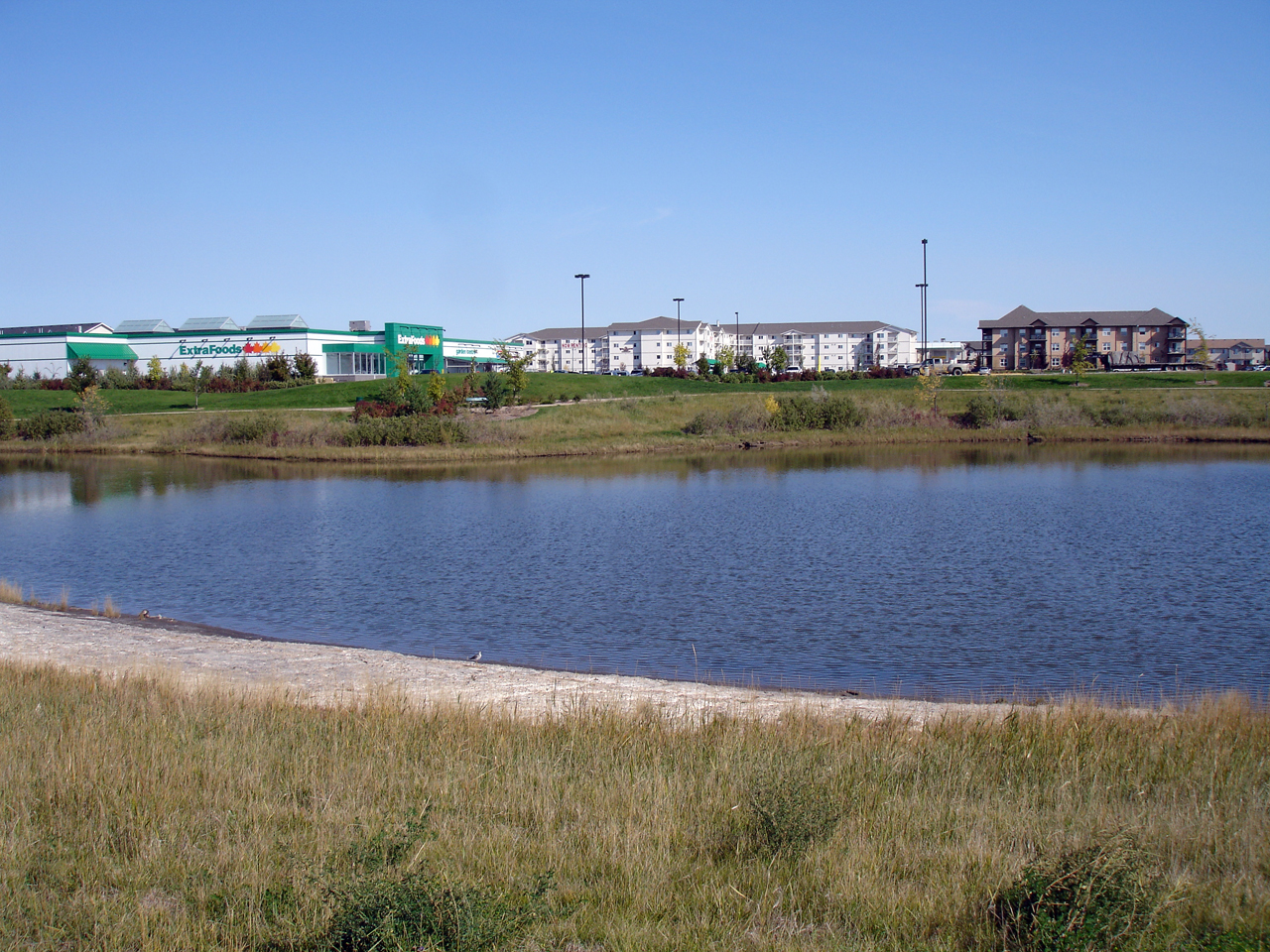
Retention basin for management of stormwater

Stormwater is a major cause of urban flooding, which is the inundation of land or property in a built-up environment caused by stormwater overwhelming the capacity of drainage systems, such as storm sewers. Although triggered by single events such as flash flooding or snow melt, urban flooding is a condition, characterized by its repetitive, costly and systemic impacts on communities. In areas susceptible to urban flooding, backwater valves and other infrastructure may be installed to mitigate losses.

Where properties are built with basements, urban flooding is the primary cause of basement and sewer backups. Although the number of casualties from urban flooding is usually limited, the economic, social and environmental consequences can be considerable: in addition to direct damage to property and infrastructure (highways, utilities and services), chronically wet houses are linked to an increase in respiratory problems and other illnesses. Sewer backups are often caused by defects in the sanitary sewer system, which takes on some storm water as a result of infiltration and inflow (groundwater entering sanitary sewers, and water entering sanitary sewers from inappropriate connections).

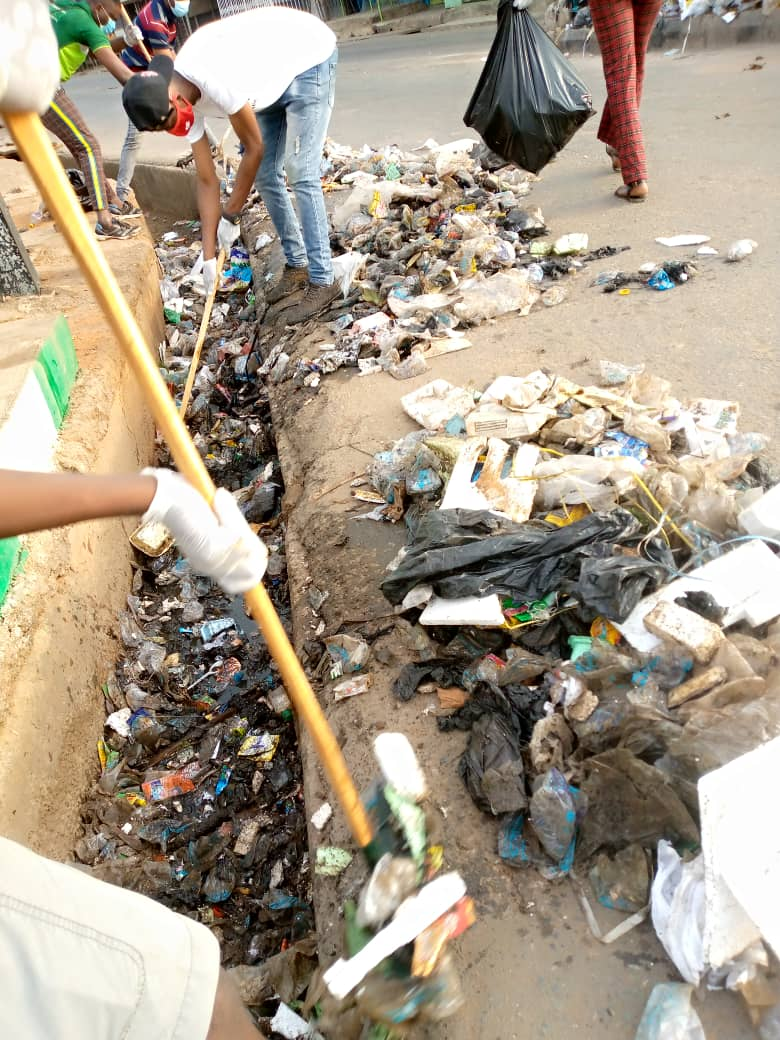
Volunteers clearing gutters in Ilorin, Nigeria

=== Stormwater creation of sinkhole collapses ===
An example of urban stormwater creating a sinkhole collapse is the February 25, 2002 Dishman Lane collapse in Bowling Green, Kentucky where a sinkhole suddenly dropped the road under four traveling vehicles. The nine-month repair of the Dishman Lane collapse cost a million dollars but there remains the potential for future problems.

In undisturbed areas with natural subsurface (karst) drainage, soil and rock fragments choke karst openings, thereby being a self-limitation to the growth of openings. The undisturbed karst drainage system becomes balanced with the climate so it can drain the water produced by most storms. However, problems occur when the landscape is altered by urban development. In urban areas with natural subsurface karst drainage there are no surface streams for the increased stormwater from impervious surfaces such as roofs, parking lots, and streets to receive drainage. Instead, the stormwater enters the subsurface drainage system by moving down through the ground. When the subsurface water flow becomes great enough to transport soil and rock fragments, the karst openings grow rapidly. Where karst openings are roofed by supportive (competent) limestone, there frequently is no surface warning that an opening has grown so large it will suddenly collapse catastrophically. It is recommended that land-use planning agencies avoid karst areas when considering new development projects. Ultimately taxpayers end up paying the costs for poor land use decisions.

== Stormwater management ==
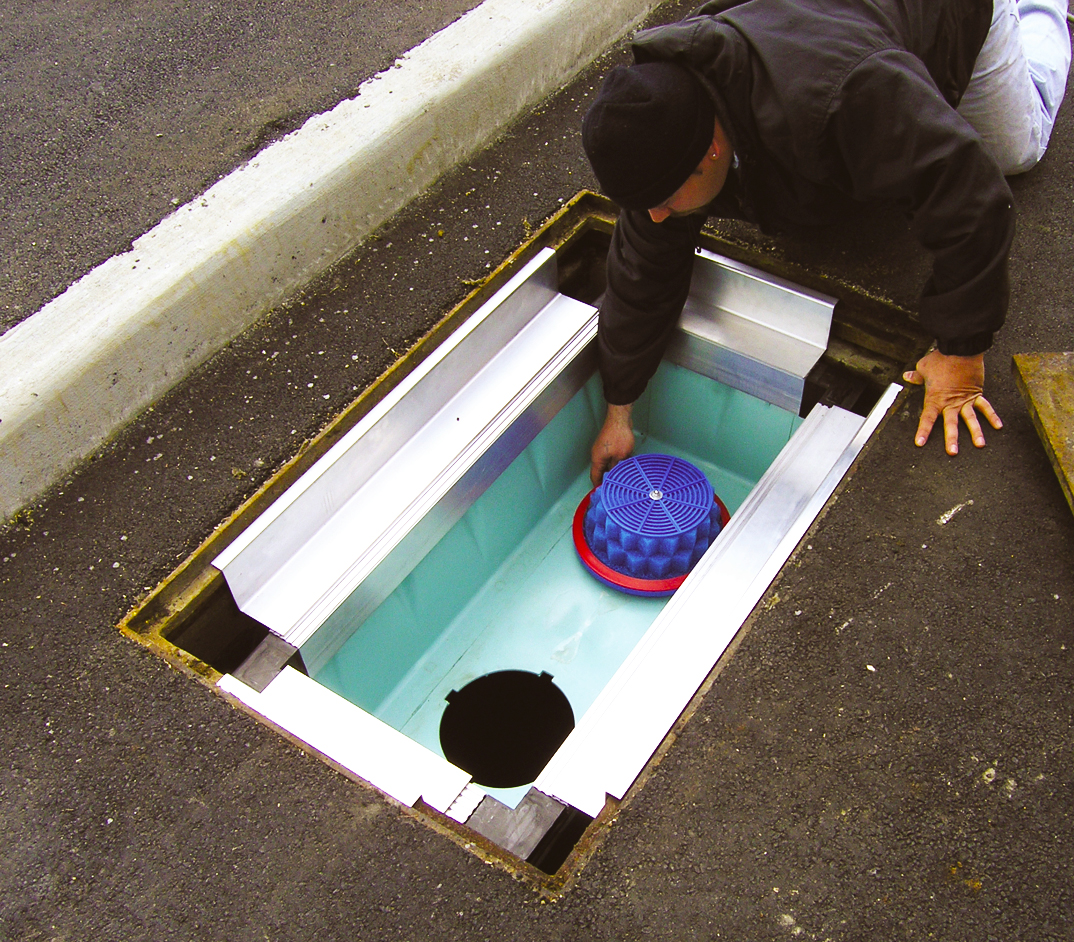
Stormwater filtration system for urban runoff

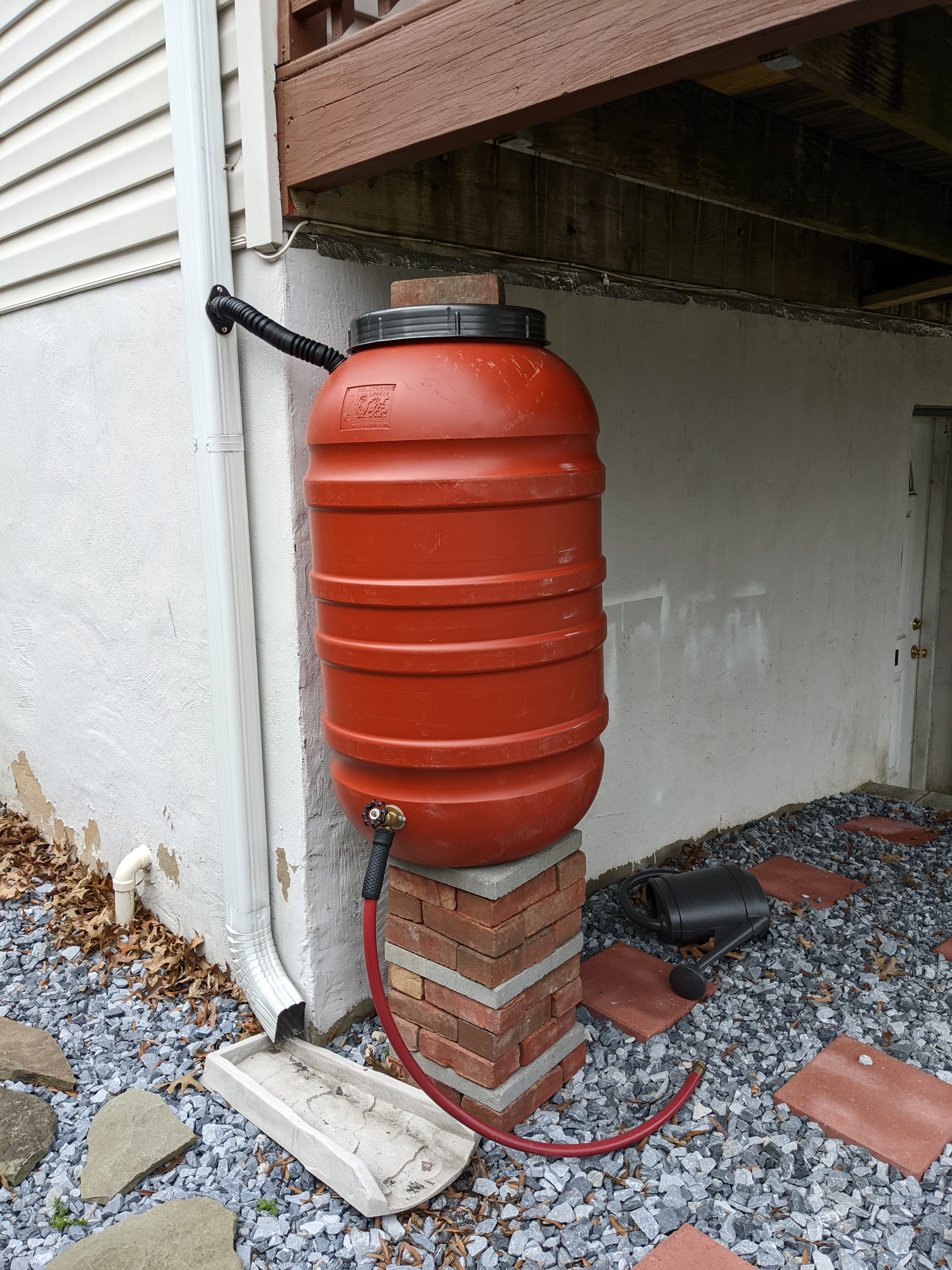
Rain barrel reducing runoff from a building downspout

Managing the quantity and quality of stormwater is termed, "Stormwater Management." The term Best Management Practice (BMP) or stormwater control measure (SCM) is often used to refer to both structural or engineered control devices and systems (e.g. retention ponds) to treat or store polluted stormwater, as well as operational or procedural practices (e.g. street sweeping). Stormwater management includes both technical and institutional aspects.

=== Technical aspects ===
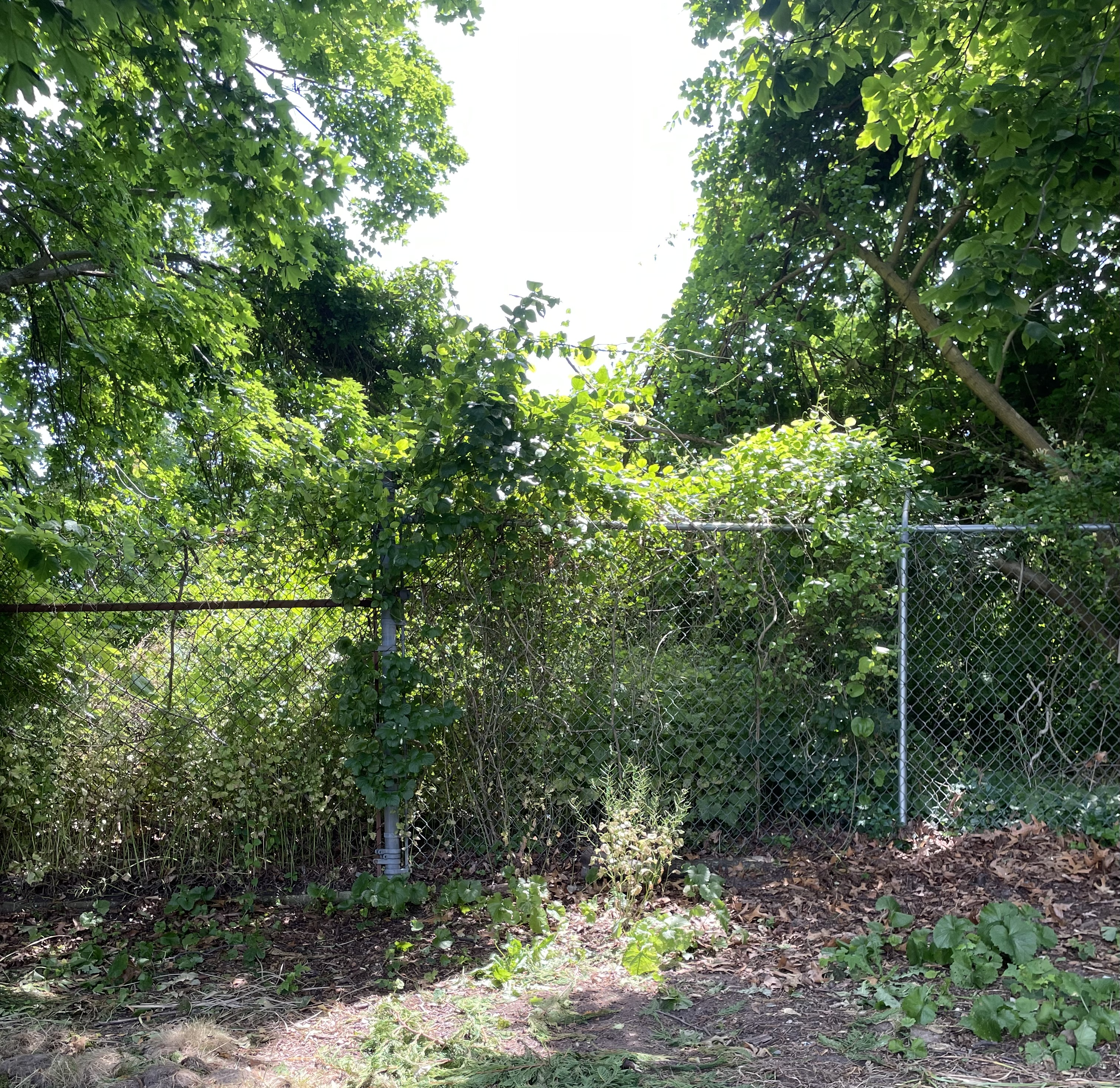
A sump in Islip, NY built to collect rainwater and prevent flooding

- control of flooding and erosion;
- control of hazardous materials to prevent release of pollutants into the environment (source control);
- planning and construction of stormwater systems like retention basins, buried vaults with various kinds of media filters, and vortex separators to remove coarse solids before they pollute surface waters or groundwater resources;
- acquisition and protection of natural waterways or rehabilitation;
- building nature-based solutions such as ponds, swales, constructed wetlands or green infrastructure solutions to work with existing or "hard" drainage structures, such as pipes and concrete channels (constructed wetlands built for stormwater treatment can also serve as habitat for plants, amphibians and fish)

=== Institutional and policy aspects ===
- development of funding approaches to stormwater programs potentially including stormwater user fees and the creation of a stormwater utility;
- development of long-term asset management programs to repair and replace aging infrastructure;
- revision of current stormwater regulations to address comprehensive stormwater needs;
- enhancement and enforcement of existing ordinances to make sure property owners consider the effects of stormwater before, during and after development of their land;
- education of a community about how its actions affect water quality, and about what it can do to improve water quality.

== Integrated water management ==
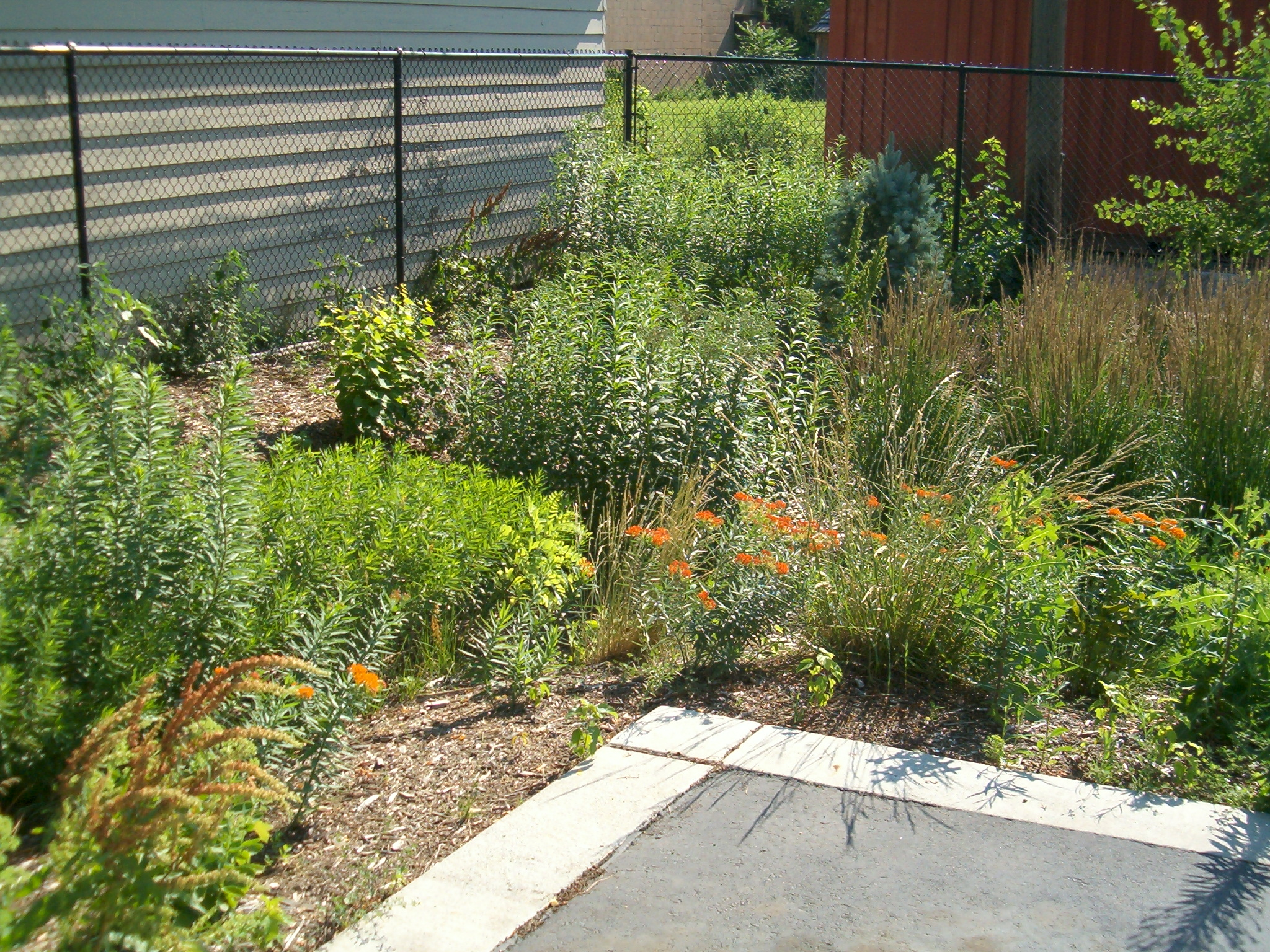
Rain garden designed to treat stormwater from adjacent parking lot.

Integrated water management (IWM) of stormwater has the potential to address many of the issues affecting the health of waterways and water supply challenges facing the modern urban city. IWM is often associated with green infrastructure when considered in the design process. Professionals in their respective fields, such as urban planners, architects, landscape architects, interior designers, and engineers, often consider integrated water management as a foundation of the design process.

Also known as low impact development (LID) in the United States, or Water Sensitive Urban Design (WSUD) in Australia, IWM has the potential to improve runoff quality, reduce the risk and impact of flooding and deliver an additional water resource to augment potable supply.

The development of the modern city often results in increased demands for water supply due to population growth, while at the same time altered runoff predicted by climate change has the potential to increase the volume of stormwater that can contribute to drainage and flooding problems. IWM offers several techniques, including stormwater harvest (to reduce the amount of water that can cause flooding), infiltration (to restore the natural recharge of groundwater), biofiltration or bioretention (e.g., rain gardens), to store and treat runoff and release it at a controlled rate to reduce impact on streams and wetland treatments (to store and control runoff rates and provide habitat in urban areas).

There are many ways of achieving LID. The most popular is to incorporate land-based solutions to reduce stormwater runoff through the use of retention ponds, bioswales, infiltration trenches, sustainable pavements (such as permeable paving), and others noted above. LID can also be achieved by utilizing engineered, manufactured products to achieve similar, or potentially better, results as land-based systems (underground storage tanks, stormwater treatment systems, biofilters, etc.). The proper LID solution is one that balances the desired results (controlling runoff and pollution) with the associated costs (loss of usable land for land-based systems versus capital cost of manufactured solution). Green (vegetated) roofs are also another low-cost solution.

IWM as a movement can be regarded as being in its infancy and brings together elements of drainage science, ecology and a realization that traditional drainage solutions transfer problems further downstream to the detriment of the environment and water resources.

== Regulations ==
=== United States ===
==== Federal requirements ====
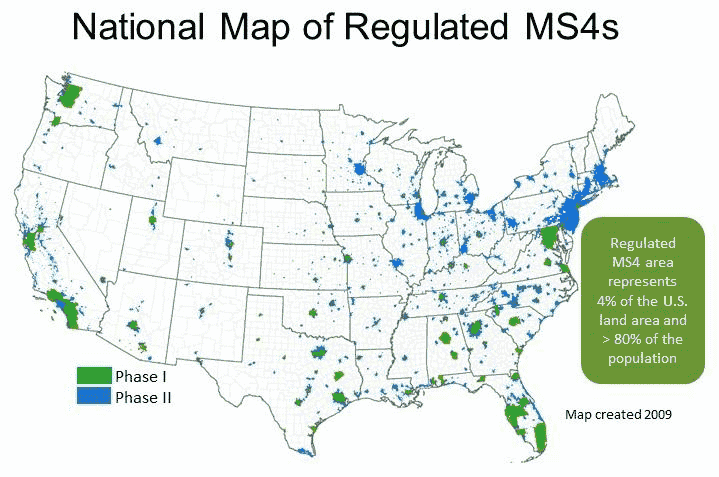
Map of municipal separate storm sewer systems

In the United States, the Environmental Protection Agency (EPA) is charged with regulating stormwater pursuant to the Clean Water Act (CWA). The goal of the CWA is to restore all "Waters of the United States" to their "fishable" and "swimmable" conditions. Point source discharges, which originate mostly from municipal wastewater (sewage) and industrial wastewater discharges, have been regulated since enactment of the CWA in 1972. Pollutant loadings from these sources are tightly controlled through the issuance of National Pollution Discharge Elimination System (NPDES) permits. However, despite these controls, thousands of water bodies in the U.S. remain classified as "impaired," meaning that they contain pollutants at levels higher than is considered safe by EPA for the intended beneficial uses of the water. Much of this impairment is due to polluted runoff, generally in urbanized watersheds (in other US watersheds, agricultural pollution is a major source).

To address the nationwide problem of stormwater pollution, Congress broadened the CWA definition of "point source" in 1987 to include industrial stormwater discharges and Municipal Separate Storm Sewer Systems ("MS4"). These facilities are required to obtain NPDES permits. In 2017, about 855 large municipal systems (serving populations of 100,000 or more), and 6,695 small systems are regulated by the permit system.

==== State and local requirements ====
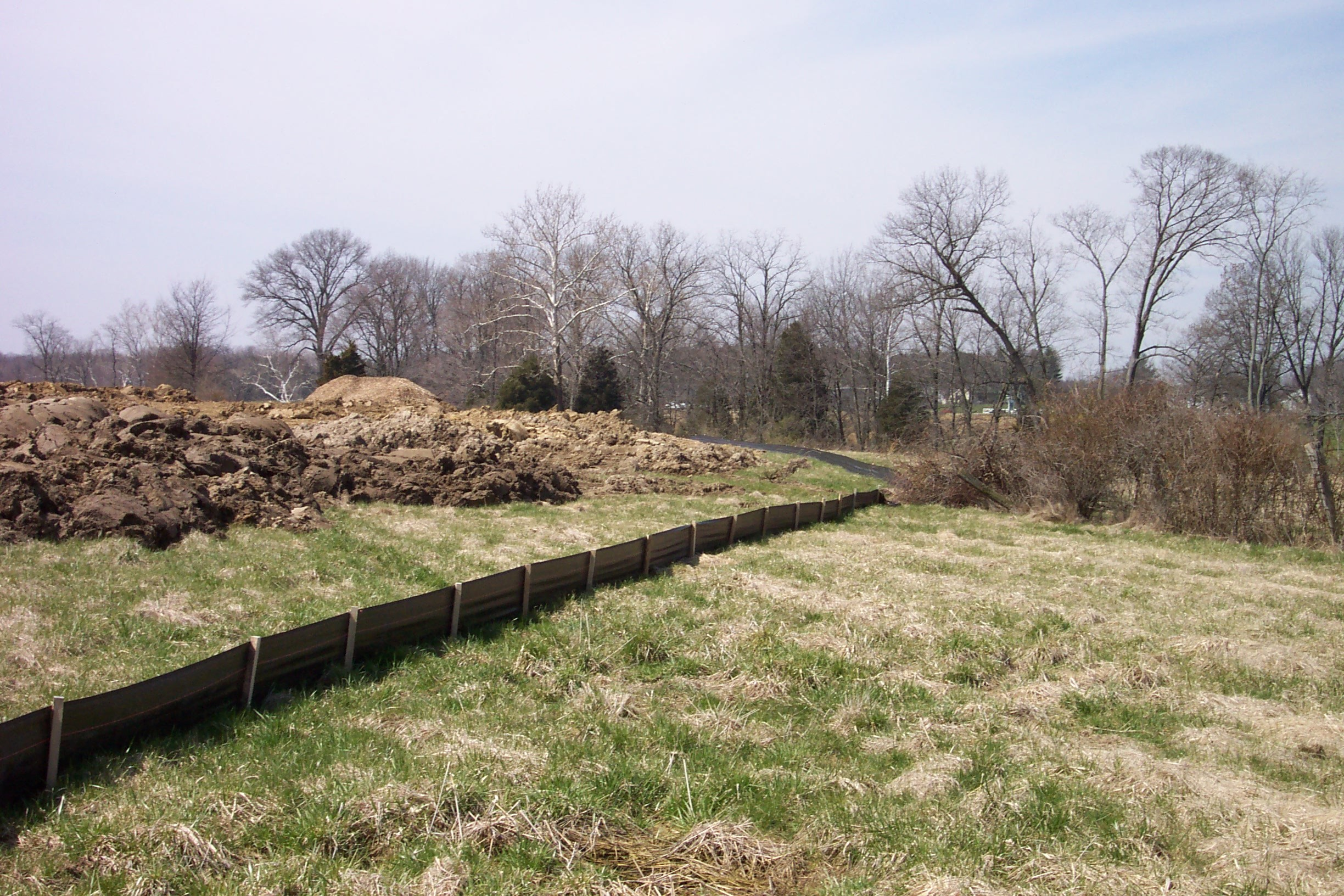
A silt fence, a type of sediment control, installed on a construction site

EPA has authorized 47 states to issue NPDES permits. In addition to implementing the NPDES requirements, many states and local governments have enacted their own stormwater management laws and ordinances, and some have published stormwater treatment design manuals. Some of these state and local requirements have expanded coverage beyond the federal requirements. For example, the State of Maryland requires erosion and sediment controls on construction sites of 5,000 sq ft (460 m^{2}) or more. It is not uncommon for state agencies to revise their requirements and impose them upon counties and cities; daily fines ranging as high as $25,000 can be imposed for failure to modify their local stormwater permitting for construction sites, for instance.

==== Nonpoint source pollution management ====
Agricultural runoff (except for concentrated animal feeding operations, or "CAFO") is classified as nonpoint source pollution under the CWA. It is not included in the CWA definition of "point source" and therefore not subject to NPDES permit requirements. The 1987 CWA amendments established a non-regulatory program at EPA for nonpoint source pollution management consisting of research and demonstration projects. Related programs, such as the Environmental Quality Incentives Program are conducted by the Natural Resources Conservation Service (NRCS) in the U.S. Department of Agriculture.

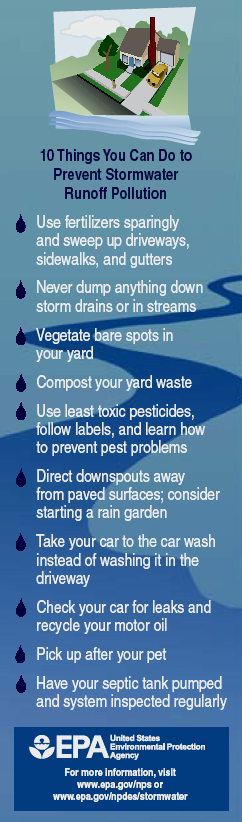
EPA public education graphic

== Public education campaigns ==
Education is a key component of stormwater management. A number of agencies, organizations, and now climate tech companies have launched campaigns to teach the public about stormwater pollution, and how they can contribute to solving it. Thousands of local governments in the U.S. have developed education programs as required by their NPDES stormwater permits.

Climate and property tech companies are also now focused on property education when it comes to stormwater damage and resiliency.. Other public education campaigns highlight the importance of green infrastructure in slowing down and treating stormwater runoff. DuPage County, Illinois launched its "Love Blue, Live Green" outreach campaign on social media sites to educate the public on green infrastructure and some other best management practices for stormwater runoff. The county distributed articles, websites, pictures, videos and other media through this campaign.

== History ==
Stormwater infrastructure is an expensive long-term investment that is difficult to replace when the underlying circumstances change. As a result, the system will perform worse or malfunction more frequently over time. This is precisely what is occurring in the region surrounding Europe and the Baltic Sea, where the quickening pace of climate change is stressing the systems, the advancement of urbanization, and stricter regulations. Rethinking stormwater management techniques and investing in infrastructure are essential to adapting to these rapidly changing circumstances.

Stormwater runoff has been an issue since humans began living in concentrated villages or urban settings. During the Bronze Age, housing took a more concentrated form, and impervious surfaces emerged as a factor in the design of early human settlements. Some of the early incorporation of stormwater engineering is evidenced in Ancient Greece.

A specific example of an early stormwater runoff system design is found in the archaeological recovery at Minoan Phaistos on Crete.

== See also ==
- Aquifer storage and recovery
- Green infrastructure
- Green roof
- HydroCAD Stormwater modeling software
- Nationwide Urban Runoff Program (U.S. research program)
- Rainwater harvesting
- Reclaimed water
- Resin-bound paving
- Sanitary sewer overflow
- Settling basin
- Stochastic Empirical Loading and Dilution Model
- Storm Water Management Model
- Stream restoration
- Sustainable drainage system
- Tree box filter
- Water conservation
- Water pinch analysis
- Water-sensitive urban design
