= Tree box filter =

Stormwater treatment system

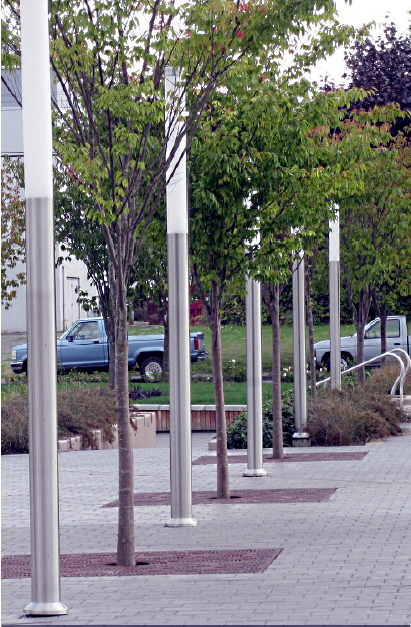
Tree box filters installed in a sidewalk

A tree box filter is a best management practice (BMP) or stormwater treatment system widely implemented along sidewalks, street curbs, and car parks. They are used to control the volume and amount of urban runoff pollutants entering into local waters, by providing areas where water can collect and naturally infiltrate or seep into the ground. Such systems usually consist of a tree planted in a soil media, contained in a small, square, concrete box. Tree box filters are popular bioretention and infiltration practices, as they collect, retain, and filter runoff as it passes through vegetation and microorganisms in the soil. The water is then either consumed by the tree or transferred into the storm drain system.

== Construction ==
=== Design considerations ===
Before construction of the tree box filter, several factors must be considered to maximize the effectiveness and impact of the system. Such factors include:

- area available
- area of coverage
- types of contaminants
- level of rainfall
- aesthetic appeal
- maintenance
- budget

In order to accommodate such considerations, the location, design, and type of material of the box filter may be altered.

=== Location ===
Tree box filters are designed to accommodate a low volume of rainfall. A filter surface area of 48 feet (15 m) can only cover up to 0.25 acres (0.10 ha) of impervious or nonporous surface. As a result, strategically positioning multiple tree boxes around the area of coverage is vital, when trying to reduce costs and work.

=== Design ===
Tree box filters consist of four main parts:

- Tree
- Open-bottom concrete box
- Porous soil mix
- Underdrain

The tree is planted in a soil mixture of construction sand, unscreened topsoil, and compost. The soil layer must be deep enough to accommodate nutrient and space requirements of the tree. It is recommended that there be 2 cubic feet (0.057 m^{3}) of soil for every 1 cubic foot (0.028 m^{3}) of tree canopy. Therefore, a five by six foot tree box must contain at least two feet of soil media in order to sustain a tree with a canopy of thirty square feet. Underneath the layer of soil lies the underdrain. This consists of a layer of crushed stone, at least two feet (0.6 meters) deep, surrounding a perforated drainage pipe. The drainage pipe connects to the municipality's existing storm drain system, allowing excess water to flow out, preventing overflow. These layers are encapsulated in a concrete box, hence the name tree box filter. Optionally, a metal grate may be placed on top of the concrete box, blocking large pieces of debris from entering the soil layer. When the tree box filter is located next to the street, a storm drain inlet may be implemented, allowing stormwater to enter from the street gutter. Stormwater from urban roof runoff can also be channeled to the tree-pits via roof drainage pipes.

=== Installation procedure ===
Installing a tree box filter may take only two to three days to accomplish, as all the necessary layers are delivered inside the box, ready to plant. First, preexisting, underground pipes and cables around the work site are marked out. Next, a rubber-tire backhoe will excavate the area where the box will be placed. Next, the concrete box containing all the main parts, except the tree, is set into the hole on a leveled base. Then underdrain pipes are connected, and any gaps around the tree box are refilled. Finally, the tree is planted, and if included, the metal grate is installed. Final tests and inspections of the tree box filter's function conclude the installation procedure. Depending on the location and area of coverage, installation can cost between $12,500 and $65,000.

== Maintenance ==
Maintenance of tree box filters may include, but is not limited to

- Tree health and safety inspections
- Pruning or trimming
- Replacing mulch and fertilizer
- Litter removal
- Stake removal
- Tree straightening

The cost of care can range from $100 to $500 per year for each tree box filter. In order to extend the life and efficiency of the tree box filter, it is recommended that inspections be conducted yearly.

== Filtration efficiency ==
When implemented properly, tree box filters can significantly reduce the amount of pollutants in the stormwater that it infiltrates.

Mean Concentrations of Pollutants Entering and Exiting the Tree Box Filter
| Type of Pollutant | Inflow (mg/L) | Outflow (mg/L) |
|---|---|---|
| Nitrogen | 8.97±5.13 | 3.71±4.20 |
| Zinc | 0.2±0.05 | 0.1±0.1 |
| Phosphorus | 0.54±0.46 | 0.14±0.14 |
| Biological oxygen demand | 12.12±9.67 | 5.39±7.15 |
| Chemical oxygen demand | 131.95±137.07 | 29.82±40.31 |
| Total suspended solids | 156.54±150.95 | 9.3±12.96 |

The ratio of pollutants exiting versus entering the tree box filter is known as the load ratio. Tree box filters show load ratios of 0.1 to 0.3 in the reduction of soluble metals, 0.35 to 0.6 in the reduction of organics and nutrients, and 0.09 in the reduction of total suspended solids.

Tree box filters remove about 80-90% of total suspended solids, 38-65% of nitrogen, and 50-80% of phosphorus, 54% of zinc, 40% of copper, and 90% of petroleum hydrocarbons. Based on these results, it can be concluded that tree box filters can significantly reduce the amount of pollutants in water that flows through the system, greatly lessening the impact on local surface waters.
