= Stormwater harvesting =

Collection of rainwater runoff

Ground catchment system

Stormwater harvesting or stormwater reuse is the collection, accumulation, treatment or purification, and storage of stormwater for its eventual reuse. While rainwater harvesting collects precipitation primarily from rooftops, stormwater harvesting deals with collection of runoff from creeks, gullies, ephemeral streams and underground conveyance. It can also include catchment areas from developed surfaces, such as roads or parking lots, or other urban environments such as parks, gardens and playing fields.

Water that comes into contact with impervious surfaces, or saturated surfaces incapable of absorbing more water, is termed surface runoff. As the surface runoff travels greater distance over impervious surfaces it often becomes contaminated and collects an increasing amount of pollutants. A main challenge of stormwater harvesting is the removal of pollutants in order to make this water available for reuse.

Stormwater harvesting projects often have multiple objectives, such as reducing contaminated runoff to sensitive waters, promoting groundwater recharge, and non-potable applications such as toilet flushing and irrigation. Stormwater harvesting is also practiced in areas of the United States as a way to address rising water demands as population rises. Internationally, Australia is notable in its active pursuit of stormwater harvesting.

== Systems ==
Ground catchments systems channel water from a prepared catchment area into storage. These systems are often considered in areas where rainwater is scarce and other sources of water are not available. If properly designed, ground catchment systems can collect large quantities of rainwater. In arid ranch land, a catchwater or cattle tank can be constructed across shallow ephemeral washes to impound and collect what little stormwater does generate there. This untreated water is easily accessed and utilized by livestock. More intricate collection and processing systems are necessary for stormwater harvest to be reused for human uses.

== Capture process ==
There are five core steps to stormwater capture: End Use, Collection, Treatment, Storage, and Distribution.

=== End use ===
Water resources become more scarce as the human population grows. Populations need to create systems and methods to minimize water consumption at all levels, while simultaneously engineering new methods of water reuse. For non-potable water purposes with lower water quality needs, people can use stormwater for toilet flushing, gardening, fire fighting, irrigation, etc. For potable water use of higher water quality, stormwater needs to be highly treated before final use. The latter has rarely been used around the world.

Some stormwater collection systems aim to simply reduce the amount of stormwater runoff that flows to a nearby waterway. The benefits of these systems include reducing pollution in streams, lakes, and nearshore coastal environments, as well as promoting groundwater recharge. The intended end use of a system will determine the level of treatment and processing of collected stormwater.

=== Collection ===
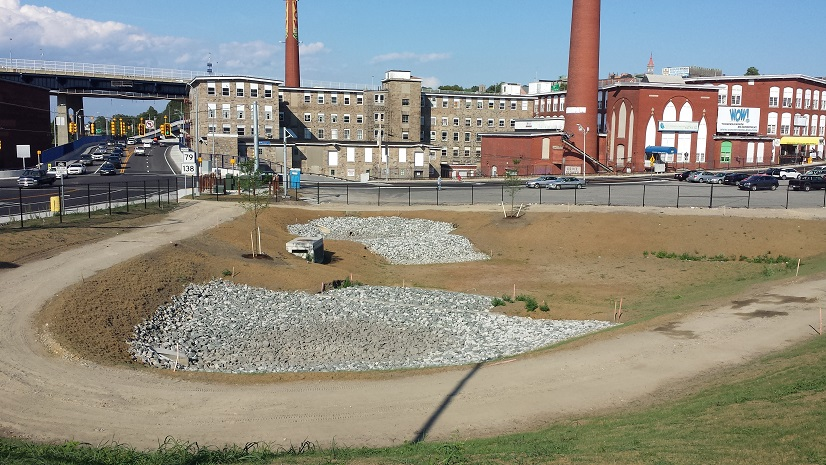
Recently completed infiltration basin for stormwater collection

Stormwater collection is a process of directing water into storage from stormwater gathering, such as urban runoff. Generally, there are two types; online storages and offline storages.

Online storages are a conventional way of acquiring stormwater directly from waterways or drains. For instance, the urban drainage system of channels and pipes conduct stormwater into storage facilities, often with treatment at or just prior to storage. One drawback of this collection design is the required maintenance that systems may require for structural integrity to prevent conduit failure resulting in stormwater leakage. Water Sensitive Urban Design, or WSUD, is one comprehensive planning and design process that incorporates online stormwater storage into urban development models.

Offline storages require additional facilities to conduct water from waterways indirectly, and can serve as storage for stormwater prior to treatment. For instance, weirs divert flows into stormwater containment and contribute to a large part of stormwater catchment for a city, where it is then stored for future treatment and distribution. Stormwater collection is widely practiced for purposes of urban runoff and flood mitigation as well.

=== Treatment ===
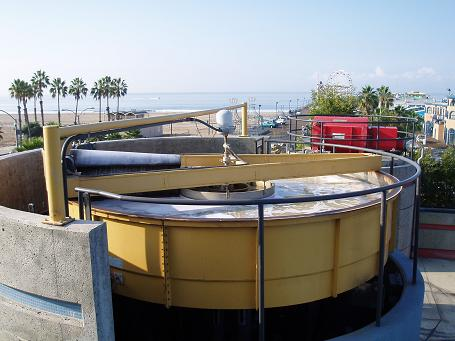
Dissolved Air Floatation Treatment at the Santa Monica Urban Runoff Recycling Facility

Stormwater treatment is the greatest challenge for stormwater harvesting. Water treatment processes depend on the intended end use and the catchment equipment, which determines the level of pollutants to be filtered and removed. For instance, construction uses may only require non-potable water where the water processing includes only filtration and disinfection. However, for potable uses of higher water quality, the treatment process requires screening, coagulation, filtration, carbon adsorption, and disinfection.

=== Storage ===
There are three factors to consider in terms of storage: function, location, and capacity.

The planner is responsible for determining the end use of the stored stormwater, such as fire fighting, industrial water supply, farming and irrigation, recreation, flood mitigation, groundwater recharge, etc.

Regarding location of a system and its storage, a water tank in proximity to the waters' end use may be the best design. If the collection system is intended to slow runoff and/or recharge an aquifer, an on-site, below ground infiltration systems may be considered. Choices between online and offline storages can affect the surrounding natural aquatic systems and yields different maintenance costs and flood mitigation effectiveness.

The capacity of a storage system will be determined by the type of end use in a particular climate or period of time.

=== Distribution ===
Generally, there are two types of stormwater distribution systems. The first is open space irrigation systems. This application uses treated stormwater to irrigate open spaces such as parks, municipal green spaces, golf courses, etc., and can be implemented at a hyper-local scale (ie catchment and reuse occurs at the same park). Another system is a non-potable distribution system which distributes treated stormwater to be used for things like toilet flushing, fire fighting, and some industrial uses. This system may require additional infrastructure such as a third-pipe network for distribution.

== Concerns ==
Major concerns for stormwater harvesting projects include cost effectiveness as well as quality, quantity, and reliability of the reclamation, as well as existing water management infrastructure and soil characteristics. Some projects have estimated stormwater harvesting to be twice as expensive per unit -when including operating costs- versus other potable water alternatives. New construction of third-pipe networks in urban settings can be prohibitively expensive; therefore the ideal project will produce recycled stormwater of potable quality in order to take advantage of existing distribution infrastructure. Attaining quality as well as useful quantity water from stormwater harvesting presents challenges of filtration efficacy as well as source reliability and predictability. However, other valuable (and hard-to-calculate) benefits include reducing soil erosion by slowing flow rates and reducing demands on local aquifers, as well as reduction of pollution into local waterways.

== See also ==
- Rainwater Hog
- Stormwater detention vault
