= Bioswale =

Landscape elements designed to manage surface runoff water

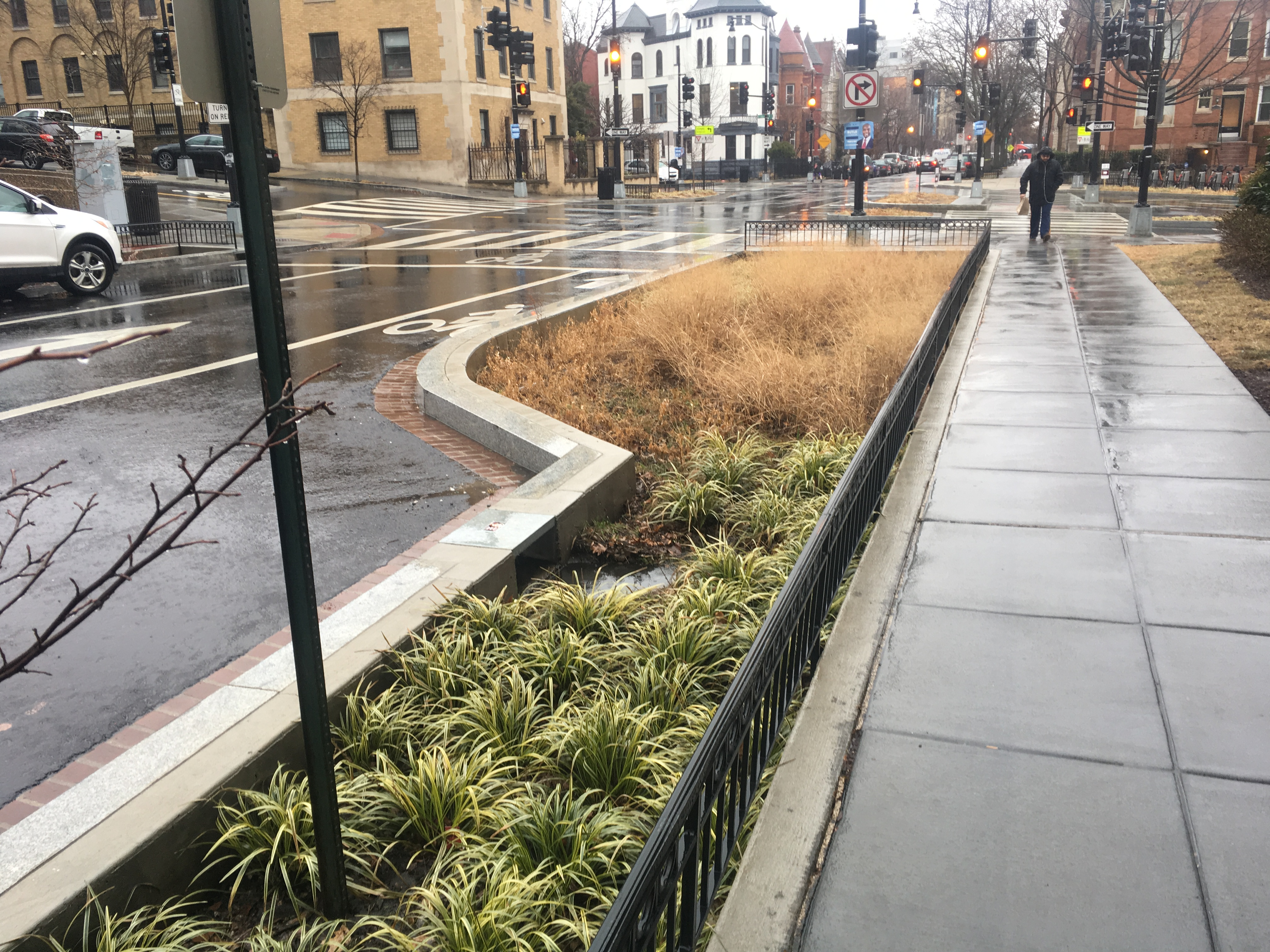
Runoff from the vicinity flows into an adjacent bioswale

Bioswales are channels designed to concentrate and convey stormwater runoff while removing debris and pollution. Bioswales can also be beneficial in recharging groundwater, reducing flooding and erosion, and creating a valuable habitat for pollinators.

Bioswales are typically vegetated, mulched, or xeriscaped. They consist of a swaled drainage course with gently sloped sides (less than 6%). Bioswale design is intended to safely maximize the time water spends in the swale, which aids the collection and removal of pollutants, silt and debris. Depending on the site topography, the bioswale channel may be straight or meander. Check dams are also commonly added along the bioswale to increase stormwater infiltration. A bioswale's make-up can be influenced by many different variables, including climate, rainfall patterns, site size, budget, and vegetation suitability.

It is important to maintain bioswales to ensure the best possible efficiency and effectiveness in removal of pollutants from stormwater runoff. Planning for maintenance is an important step, which can include the introduction of filters or large rocks to prevent clogging. Annual maintenance through soil testing, visual inspection, and mechanical testing is also crucial to the health of a bioswale.

Bioswales are commonly applied along streets and around parking lots, where substantial automotive pollution settles on the pavement and is flushed by the first instance of rain, known as the first flush. Bioswales, or other types of biofilters, can be created around the edges of parking lots to capture and treat stormwater runoff before releasing it to the watershed or storm sewer.

== Contaminants addressed ==
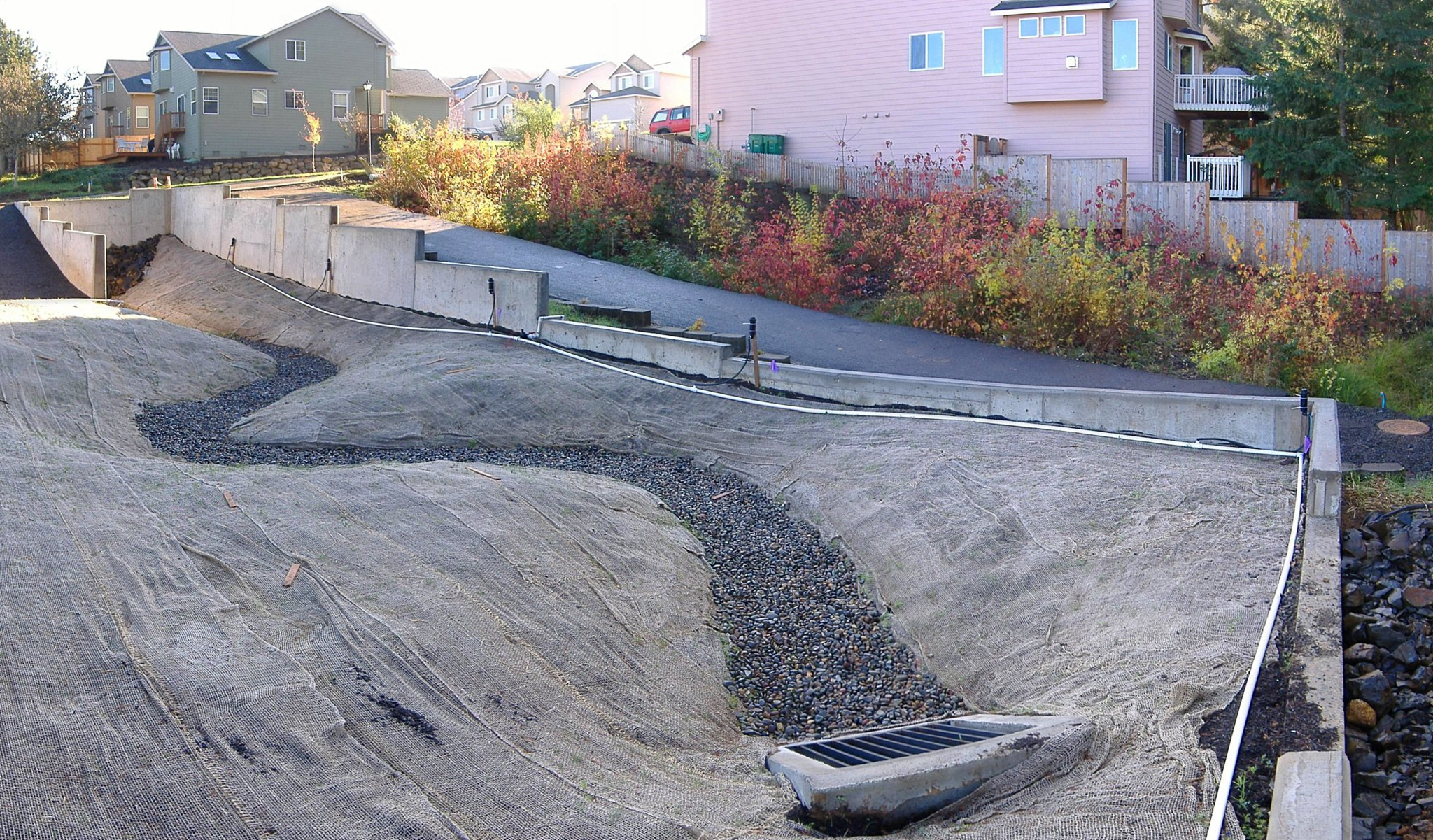
Two bioswales for a housing development. The foreground one is under construction while the background one is established.

Bioswales work to remove pollutants through vegetation and the soil. As the storm water runoff flows through the bioswale, the pollutants are captured and settled by the leaves and stems of the plants. The pollutants then enter the soil where they decompose or can be broken down by bacteria in healthy soil.

There are several classes of water pollutants that may be collected or arrested with bioswales. These fall into the categories of silt, inorganic contaminants, organic chemicals and pathogens.

- Silt. How bioswales and plants are constructed slow the conveyance of silt and reduce the turbidity of receiving waters. Filters can be established to capture debris and silt during the process.
- Organics. Many organic contaminants including polycyclic aromatic hydrocarbons will volatilize or degrade over time and bioswales slow the conveyance of these materials into waterways, and before they can affect aquatic life. Although not all organic material will be captured, the concentration of organic material is greatly reduced by bioswales.
- Pathogens are deprived of a host or from a nutrient supply long enough for them to become the target of a heterotroph.
- Common inorganic compounds are macronutrients such as phosphates and nitrates. Principal sources of these nutrients comes from agricultural runoff attributed to excess fertilization. Excess phosphates and nitrates can cause eutrophication in disposal zones and receiving waters. Specific bioswale plants absorb these excess nutrients.
- Metallic compounds such as mercury, lead, chromium, cadmium and other heavy metals are concentrated in the structures. Unfortunately, these metals slowly poison the surrounding soil. Regular soil removal is required in order to prevent metals from dissolving and releasing back into the environment. Some bioswales are designed to include hyperaccumulator plant species. These plants absorb but do not transform the metals. Cuttings from these plants often decompose back into the pond or are pruned by gardening services that do not know the compost they are collecting is poisonous.

== Best locations ==
Bioswales can be implemented in areas that require stormwater management to regulate the runoff velocity and decontaminate the runoff. Bioswales are created to handle the first flush of pollutants during the event of rain, therefore, locations that have high areas of impervious surface such as roads, parking lots, or rooftops can benefit from additions of bioswales. They can also be integrated into road medians, curb cutouts, sidewalks, or any public space.

== Benefits ==
Bioswales are useful low-impact development work to decrease the velocity of stormwater runoff while removing pollutants from the discharge. They are extremely beneficial in protecting surface water and local waterways from excessive pollution from stormwater runoff. The longer the runoff stays within the bioswale, the better the pollutant removal outcome. It is also beneficial in removing standing ponds that could potentially attract mosquitos. Bioswales can also be designed to be aesthetically pleasing and attract animals and create habitats. Bioswales can also be beneficial for groundwater recharge.

== Maintenance ==
Improper maintenance can lead to high restoration costs to address inefficient bioswales. An accumulation of large sediments, trash, and improper growth of vegetation can all affect the quality and performance of bioswales. It is beneficial at the planning stages to set apart easements to allow for easier maintenance of bioswales, whether it be adequate space to locate machinery or safety to those working. Different types of filters can be used to catch sediments. Grass filter strips or rock inlets can be used to filter sediments and particulates; however, without proper maintenance, runoff could flow away from the bioswales due to blockage. Structural inlets have become more common due to the ease of maintenance, use, and its effectiveness. Avoiding the use of floating mulch and selecting the best fit low-maintenance plants ensure better efficiency in the bioswales. Depending on a community's needs for a bioswale, a four step assessment program can be developed. Visual inspection, capacity testing, synthetic runoff, and monitoring are the four steps that can be used to evaluate performance and maintenance of bioswales.

Routine inspection is required to ensure that the performance and aesthetics of bioswales are not compromised. Time and frequency of inspections vary based on different local governments, but should occur at least once a year. Various aspects of inspection can take place, either visually or mechanically. Visual observation of the vegetation, water, and inlets are all crucial to ensure performance. Some organizations utilize checklists to streamline the visual inspection process.

There are different methods to determine if a bioswale needs maintenance. Bioswales are benchmarked to meet a specific level of infiltration to determine if maintenance is required. A staff gauge is used to measure the infiltration rate. Soil chemistry testing is also required to determine if the soil has a certain off-level of any pollutant. Phosphorus and high levels of salinity in the soil are two common pollutants that should be attended to. Analysis of inflow and outflow pollutant concentration is also another way to determine the performance level of bioswales.

Maintenance can span to three different levels of care. Aesthetic maintenance is required to remove weeds that affect the performance of the other plants and the bioswale itself, clean and remove trash, and maintaining the looks of the vegetation. Partial restoration is needed when the inlet is blocked by sediments or when vegetation needs to be replaced. Full restoration is required when the bioswales no longer filter pollutants adequately and overall performance is severely lacking.

== Design ==
Bioswales experience short, potentially intense, periods of rain, flooding and pollutant loading followed by dry seasons. It is important to take into account how the vegetation selected for the bioswales will grow and understanding what types of plants are considered the best fit.

There are four types of bioswales that can be constructed based on the needs of the location.

- Low grass bioswales utilize low growing grass that can be landscaped, similar to lawns. These types of bioswales tend to be less effective than vegetated bioswales in treating stormwater runoff and sustaining an adequate collection time.
- Vegetated bioswales are created with taller growing plants, ornamental vegetations, shrubs, and even trees. These types can also be lined with rocks to slow down the velocity of stormwater runoff that is flowing through bioswales to increase collection time for decontamination. Vegetated bioswales can also include vegetation that is highly useful in removing certain chemicals in runoffs very efficiently.
- Low water use bioswales are helpful in areas that tend to be drier with hotter climate. Xeriscape bioswales are populated with runoff generally only after rain and storms and stay dry otherwise.
- Wet bioswales are similar to wetlands in which they retain water for a much longer period of time that allows for infiltration of stormwater instead of simply emptying the water at the end of the bioswale into storm drain inlets.

Some bioswale designs include a perforated underdrain beneath the engineered soil or drainage layer, particularly where native soil permeability is insufficient to drain the system between storm events. The underdrain collects filtered water and conveys it toward a designated outlet. This subsurface drainage function is distinct from a surface overflow or bypass system, which directs runoff exceeding the bioswale's storage or treatment capacity away from the facility to reduce uncontrolled ponding and erosion.

Bioswales require a certain soil composition that does not contain more than 5% clay. The soil itself before implementation should not be contaminated. Bioswales should be constructed with a longitudinal slope to allow sediments to settle. Maximum slope of bioswales is 3:1. A minimum clearance is required to ensure that other infrastructure would not be damaged. The overfill drain should be located at least 6 inches above the ground plane to allow for maximum concentration time of stormwater runoff in the bioswales. Rocks can also be used to slow down the runoff velocity. The use of filters is important to prevent inlets from becoming blocked by sediments or trash. Engineered soil amendments have also been tested as bioswale filter media. In a 2025 laboratory flume study, a filter layer of 65% expanded shale and 35% sandy clay removed between 20% and 82% of total suspended solids depending on conditions, with removal improving with a thicker media layer and an active underdrain and declining at higher inflow rates.

== Examples ==
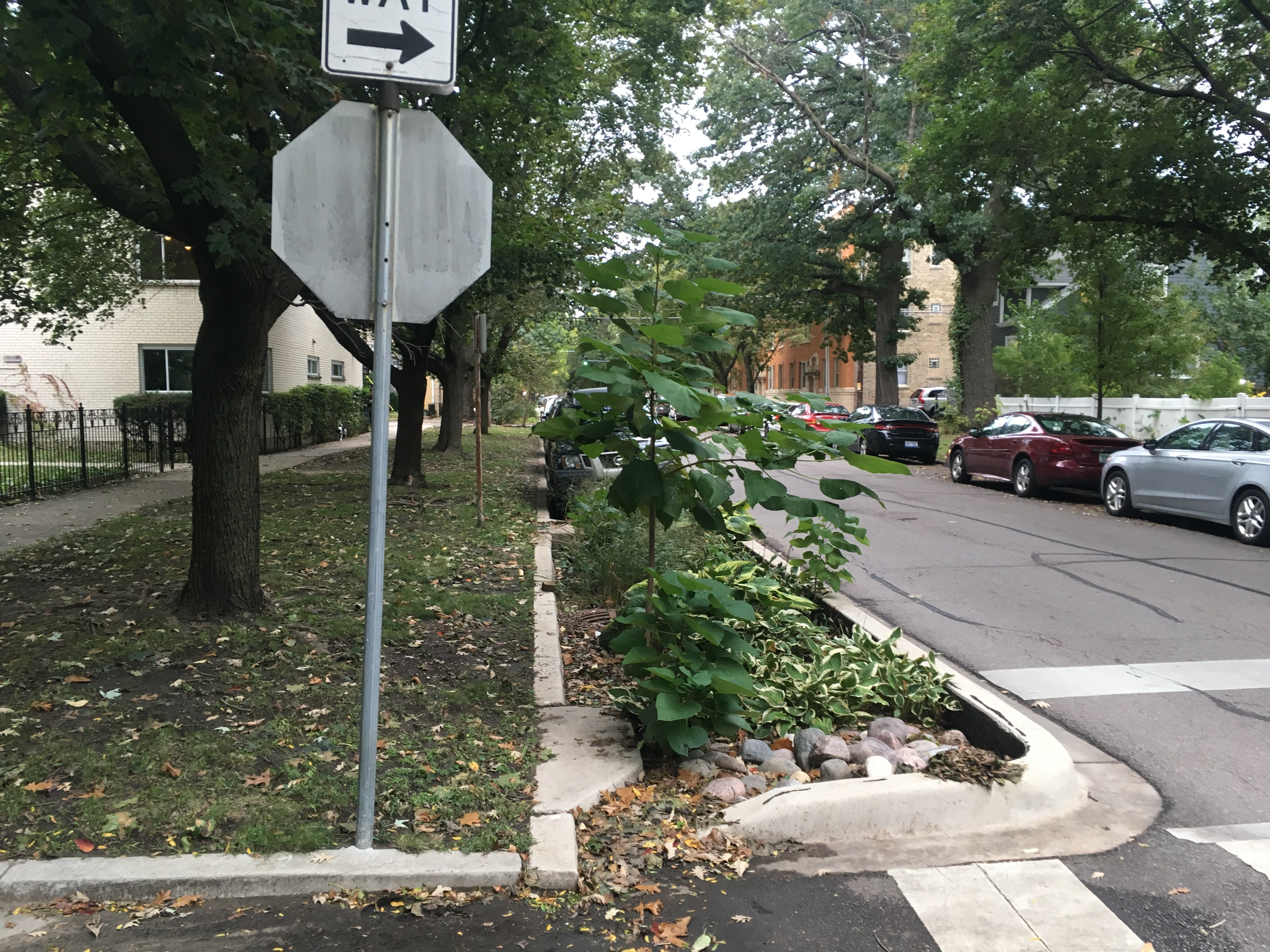
A curbside bioswale in Chicago.

Two early examples of scientifically designed bioswales for large scale applications are found in the western US. In 1996, for Willamette River Park in Portland, Oregon, a total of 2330 lineal feet of bioswale was designed and installed to capture and prevent pollutant runoff from entering the Willamette River. Intermittent check dams were installed to further abet silt capture, which reduced by 50% suspended solids entering the river system.

A second example of a large scale designed bioswale is at the Carneros Business Park, Sonoma County, California. Starting in 1997 the project design team worked with the California Department of Fish and Game and County of Sonoma to produce a detailed design to channel surface runoff at the perimeter of a large parking area. Surface runoff consists of building roof runoff, parking lot runoff and overland flow from properties to the north of the project site. A total of two lineal miles of bioswale was designed into the project. The purpose of the bioswale was to minimize runoff contaminants from entering Sonoma Creek. The bioswale channel is grass-lined and nearly linear in form. Downslope gradient is approximately 4% and cross-slope gradient is approximately 6%.

A relatively recent project established was the "Street Edge Alternatives" (SEA) project in Seattle, Washington, completed in 2001. Rather than using traditional piping, SEA's goal was to create a natural landscape that represented what the area was like before development. The street was 11% more pervious than a standard street and was characterized with evergreen trees and bioswales. The bioswales were planted on graded slopes with wetland and upland plants. Other landscaping also focused on native and salmon-friendly plants. SEA provided a strong benefit for stormwater runoff mitigation that helped continue to protect Seattle's creek ecology. The project street also created a more inviting and aesthetically pleasing site as opposed to hard landscaping.

The New York City Department of Environmental Protection (NYC DEP) has built more than 11,000 curbside bioswales, which are referred to as 'rain gardens'. Rain gardens are constructed throughout the city to manage storm water and to improve the water quality of city waterways. The care and tending of rain gardens is a partnership between the NYC DEP and a group of citizen volunteers called "harbor protectors". Rain gardens are inspected and cleaned at least once a week.

== Permaculture ==
In permaculture, swales are used for water harvesting.

== See also ==
- Bioretention
- Constructed wetland
- Green infrastructure
- Green urbanism
- Infiltration
- Rain gardens
- Riparian zone
- Soil contamination
- Storm water
- Sustainable drainage system
- Urban runoff
- Water-sensitive urban design
