= First flush =

Initial surface runoff of a rainstorm

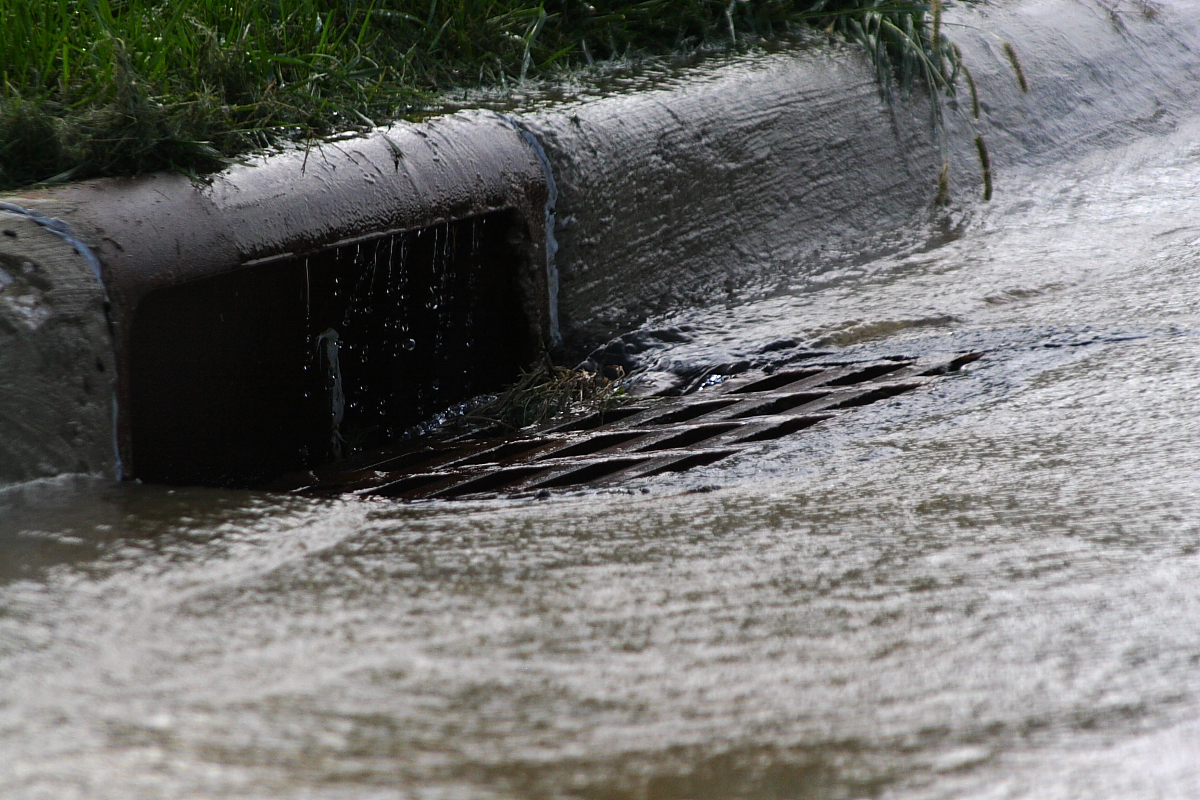
Urban runoff entering a storm drain

First flush is the initial surface runoff of a rainstorm. During this phase, water pollution entering storm drains in areas with high proportions of impervious surfaces is typically more concentrated compared to the remainder of the storm. Consequently, these high concentrations of urban runoff result in high levels of pollutants discharged from storm sewers to surface waters.

== First flush effect ==
The term "first flush effect" refers to rapid changes in water quality (pollutant concentration or load) that occur after early season rains. Soil and vegetation particles wash into streams; sediments and other accumulated organic particles on the river bed are re-suspended, and dissolved substances from soil and shallow groundwater can be flushed into streams. Recent research has shown that this effect has not been observed in relatively pervious areas.

The term is often also used to address the first flood after a dry period, which is supposed to contain higher concentrations than a subsequent one. This is referred to as "first flush flood." There are various definitions of the first flush phenomenon.

== First foul flush ==
Storm water runoff in a combined sewer produces a first foul flush with a suspension of accumulated sanitary solids from the sewer in addition to pollutants from surface runoff. Inflow may produce a foul flush effect in sanitary sewers if flows peak during wet weather. As flow rates increase above average, a relatively small percentage of the total flow contains a disproportionately large percentage of the total pollutant mass associated with overall flow volume through the peak flow event. Sewer solids deposition during low flow periods and subsequent resuspension during peak flow events is the major pollutant source for the first-flush combined-sewer overflow (CSO) phenomenon.

Sanitary sewage solids can either go through the system or settle out in laminar flow portions of the sewer to be available for washout during peak flows. The wetted perimeter of sewers may also be colonized by biofilm nourished by soluble sanitary wastes. Hydraulic design is the underlying reason for solids deposition in sewers. Combined sewers sized for peak runoff events expected once a decade can carry up to 1,000 times the average sanitary flow. Less dramatically oversized sewers are common in new developments and near the upstream end of collection systems. Suspended solids may accumulate when low-flow fluid velocities generate insufficient turbulence. Solids deposition is greatest where velocities are low during dry weather. In large combined sewers it may be impossible to attain sanitary sewage velocities generating sufficient turbulence to keep solids suspended during dry weather.

Biofilm and previously deposited solids may be scoured and re-entrained during peak flow turbulence. The high pollution load in wastewater at the beginning of a runoff event occurs when increased flow rate erodes accumulated sewer sediment. Erosion of sediments in sewers can release pollutants in concentrations exceeding levels found in contributing sources. The initial highly polluting foul flush is released at the start of wet weather flow during speedy erosion of a weak layer of highly concentrated surficial sediment bed-load. When conditions favor dry-weather solids deposition, the first foul flush may contain as much as 30 percent of the annual total suspended solids discharged to a combined sewer system. Combined sewer suspended solids concentrations of several thousand milligrams per liter (mg/L) may be observed during the first foul flush.

Pollutant concentration levels are influenced by the age and condition of the collection system and the amount of infiltration/inflow in comparison to the sanitary flow. Pollutant concentration peaks depend on size and slope of the piping system, time interval between storms, and solids accumulation in the collection system. Steeper sewer gradients and pipe bottom shapes that maintain high velocity flow during low-flow conditions will reduce sediment accumulation in sewers; and periodic sewer flushing of individual lines during dry weather may move accumulated solids to the wastewater treatment plant before stormwater runoff causes simultaneous peak flow in the entire collection system.

== Related terms ==
Because the reference of the first flush is not always clear, the terms "concentration-based first flush" (CBFF) and "mass-based first flush" (MBFF) have been introduced.

Apart from this definition, there are a number of rating parameters in literature to determine the occurrence of a first flush.

== Rainwater harvesting ==
In the context of rainwater harvesting, a first flush diverter is a simple device that is designed to protect a storage cistern from contamination by first flush runoff. This leads to a higher quality of water captured, and less silting of the cistern over time in dusty areas. The diverted first flush water is used for irrigation or other purposes in a fashion similar to greywater. Although many commercial versions are available, these devices are frequently constructed of spare pipe when the cistern is initially installed or thereafter. See Texas Manual on Rainwater Harvesting for calculations on sizing.

== See also ==
- Nationwide Urban Runoff Program - U.S. research project
- Nonpoint source pollution
- Sanitary sewer overflow
- Stormwater
