= Urban runoff =

Surface runoff of water caused by urbanization

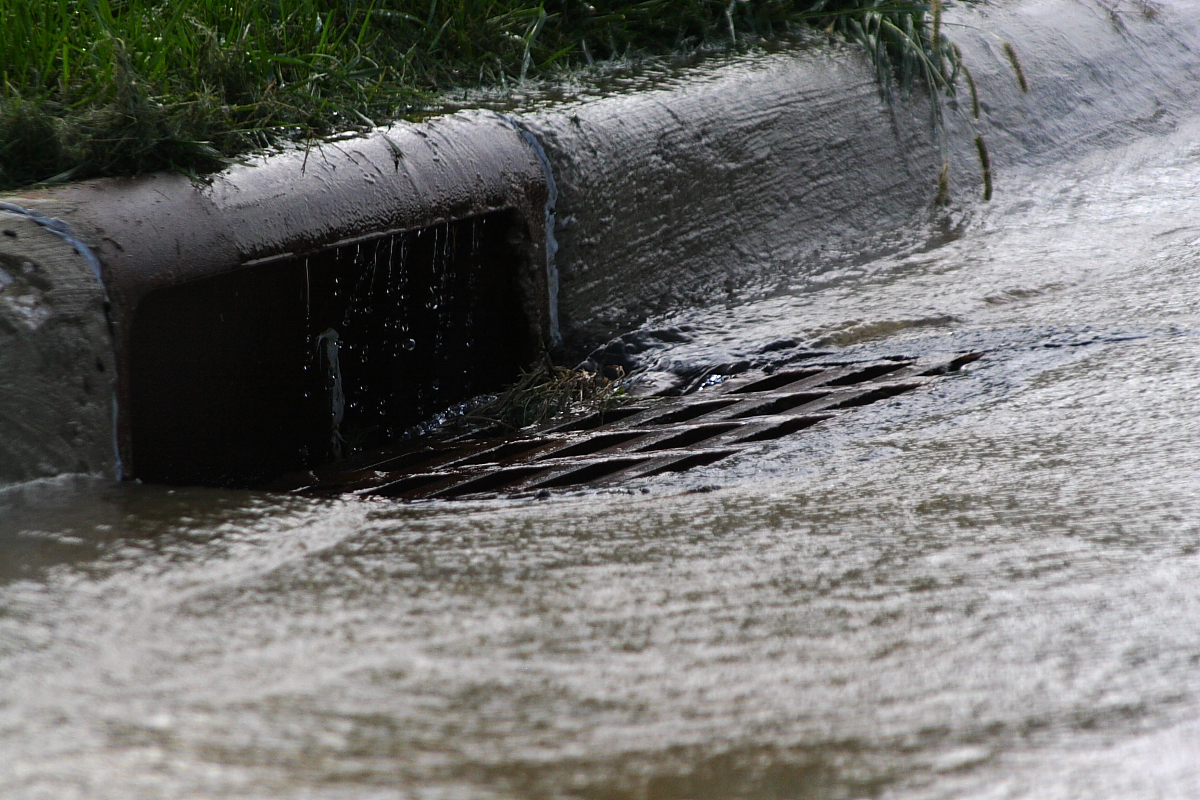
Urban runoff flowing into a storm drain

Urban runoff is surface runoff of rainwater, landscape irrigation, and car washing created by urbanization. Impervious surfaces (roads, parking lots and sidewalks) are constructed during land development. During rain, storms, and other precipitation events, these surfaces (built from materials such as asphalt and concrete), along with rooftops, carry polluted stormwater to storm drains, instead of allowing the water to percolate through soil.

This causes lowering of the water table (because groundwater recharge is lessened) and flooding since the amount of water that remains on the surface is greater. Most municipal storm sewer systems discharge untreated stormwater to streams, rivers, and bays. This excess water can also make its way into people's properties through basement backups and seepage through building walls and floors. Urban runoff can be a major source of urban flooding and water pollution in urban communities worldwide.

== Pollutants ==
Water running off impervious surfaces in urban areas tends to pick up gasoline, motor oil, heavy metals, trash, and other pollutants from roadways and parking lots, as well as fertilizers and pesticides from lawns. Roads and parking lots are major sources of polycyclic aromatic hydrocarbons (PAHs), which are created as the byproducts of the combustion of gasoline and other fossil fuels, as well as of the heavy metals nickel, copper, zinc, cadmium, and lead. Roof runoff contributes high levels of synthetic organic compounds and zinc (from galvanized gutters). Fertilizer use on residential lawns, parks and golf courses is a measurable source of nitrates and phosphorus in urban runoff when fertilizer is improperly applied or when turf is over-fertilized.

Eroding soils or poorly maintained construction sites can often lead to increased sedimentation in runoff. Sedimentation often settles to the bottom of water bodies and can directly affect water quality. Excessive levels of sediment in water bodies can increase the risk of infection and disease through high levels of nutrients present in the soil. These high levels of nutrients can reduce oxygen and boost algae growth while limiting native vegetation growth, which can disrupt aquatic ecosystems. Excessive levels of sediment and suspended solids have the potential to damage existing infrastructure as well. Sedimentation can increase surface runoff by plugging underground injection systems. Increased sedimentation levels can also reduce storage behind reservoir. This reduction of reservoir capacities can lead to increased expenses for public land agencies while also impacting the quality of water recreational areas.

Runoff can also induce bioaccumulation and biomagnification of toxins in ocean life. Small amounts of heavy metals are carried by runoff into the oceans, which can accumulate within aquatic animals to cause metal poisoning. This heavy metal poisoning can also affect humans, since ingesting a poisoned animal increases the risk of heavy metal poisoning.

As stormwater is channeled into storm drains and surface waters, the natural sediment load discharged to receiving waters decreases, but the water flow and velocity increases. In fact, the impervious cover in a typical city creates five times the runoff of a typical woodland of the same size.

== Effects ==
=== Dry weather discharges ===
Overwatering through irrigation by sprinkler may produce runoff reaching receiving waters during low flow conditions. Runoff carries accumulated pollutants to streams with unusually low dilution ratios causing higher pollutant concentrations than would be found during regional precipitation events.

=== Urban flooding ===
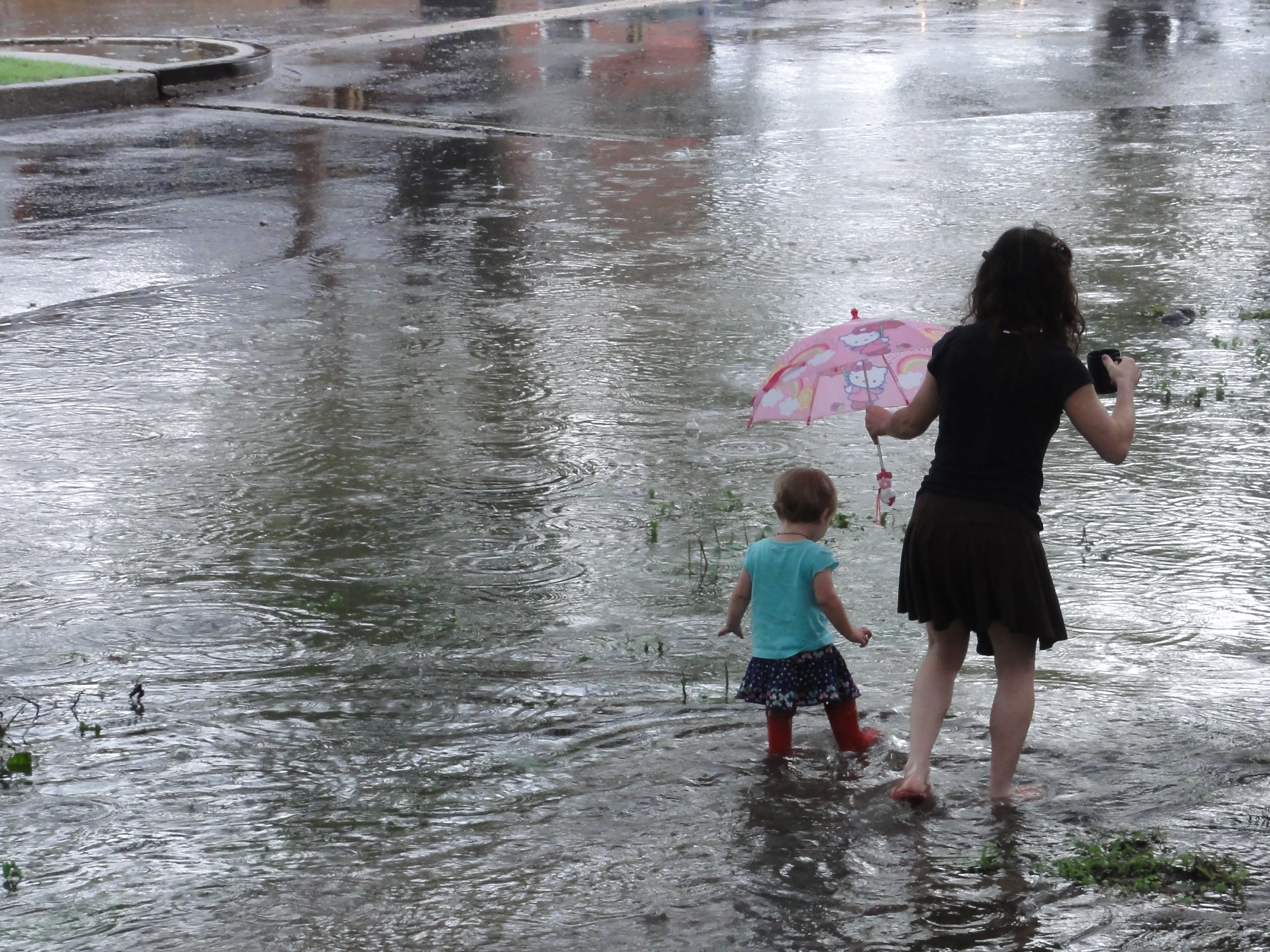
Flooded streets in New Orleans

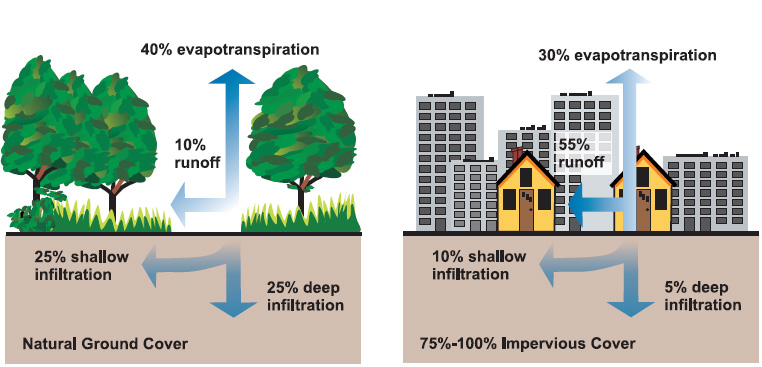
Relationship between impervious surfaces and surface runoff

Urban runoff is a major cause of urban flooding, the inundation of land or property in a built-up environment caused by rainfall overwhelming the capacity of drainage systems, such as storm sewers. Triggered by events such as flash flooding, storm surges, overbank flooding, or snow melts, urban flooding is characterized by its repetitive, costly, and systemic impacts on communities, even when not within floodplains or near any body of water.

There are several ways in which stormwater enters properties: backup through sewer pipes, toilets and sinks into buildings; seepage through building walls and floors; the accumulation of water on the property and in public rights-of-way; and the overflow of water from water bodies such as rivers and lakes. Where properties are built with basements, urban flooding is the primary cause of basement flooding.

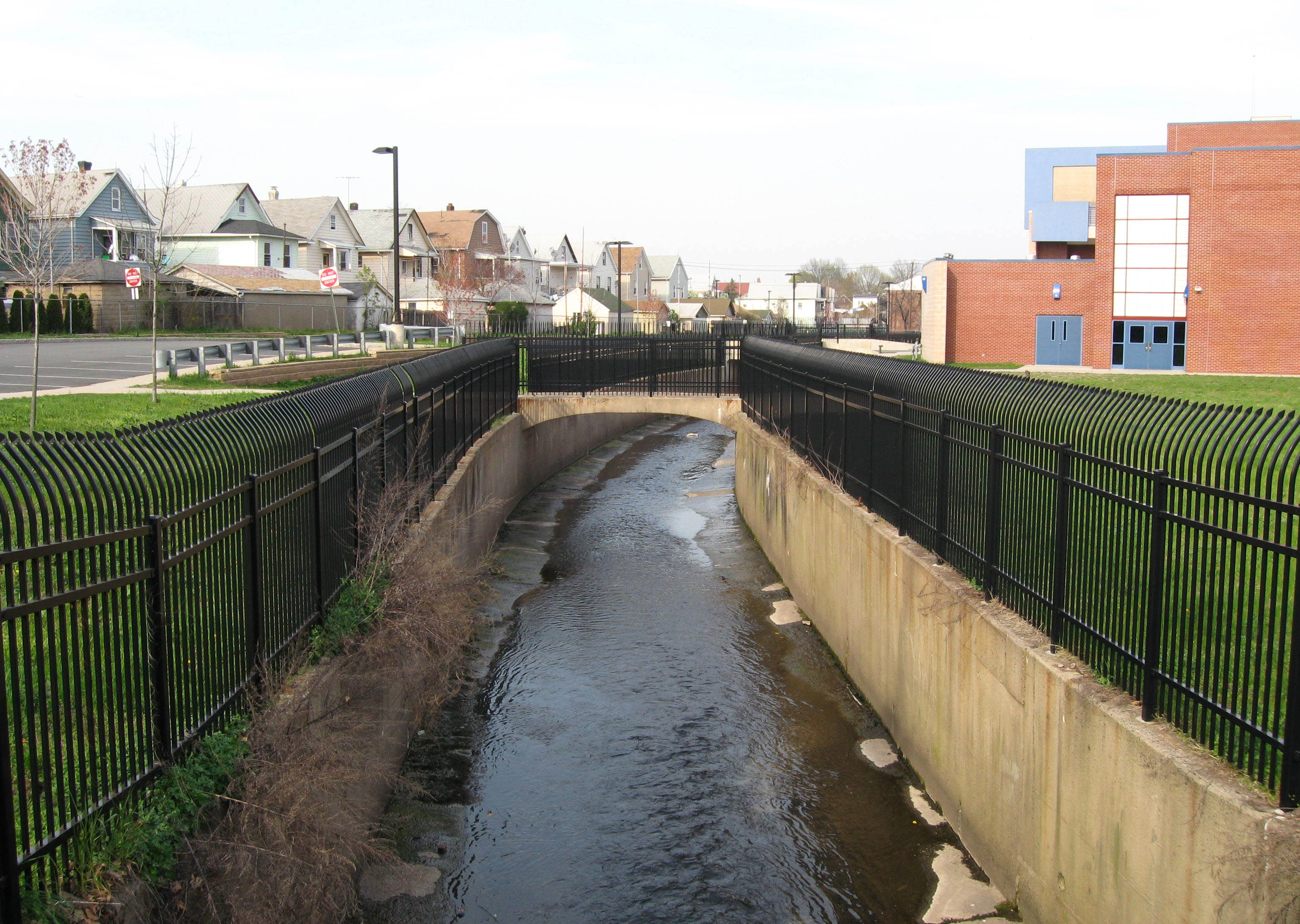
Weasel Brook in Passaic, New Jersey has been channelized with concrete walls to control localized flooding.

=== Water pollution ===
Urban runoff contributes to water quality problems. In 2009 the US National Research Council published a comprehensive report on the effects of urban stormwater and stated that it continues to be a major contamination source in many watersheds throughout the United States. The report explained that "...further declines in water quality remain likely if the land-use changes that typify more diffuse sources of pollution are not addressed... These include land-disturbing agricultural, silvicultural, urban, industrial, and construction activities from which hard-to-monitor pollutants emerge during wet-weather events. Pollution from these landscapes has been almost universally acknowledged as the most pressing challenge to the restoration of waterbodies and aquatic ecosystems nationwide."

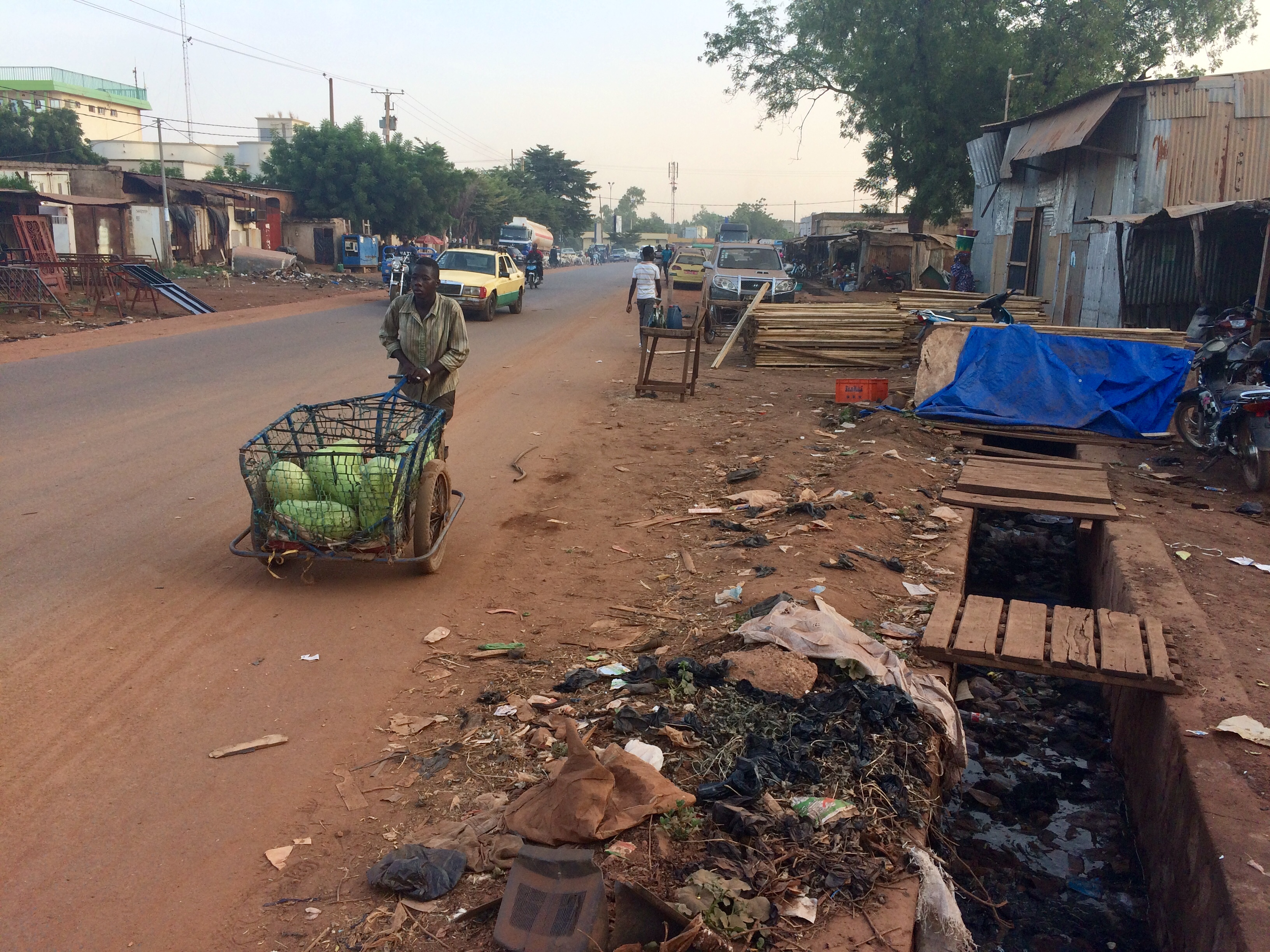
An open runoff system in Mali

The runoff also increases temperatures in streams, harming fish and other organisms. (A sudden burst of runoff from a rainstorm can cause a fish-killing shock of hot water.) Also, road salt used to melt snow on sidewalks and roadways can contaminate streams and groundwater aquifer.

One of the most pronounced effects of urban runoff is on watercourses that historically contained little or no water during dry weather periods (often called ephemeral streams). When an area around such a stream is urbanized, the resultant runoff creates an unnatural year-round streamflow that hurts the vegetation, wildlife and stream bed of the waterway. Containing little or no sediment relative to the historic ratio of sediment to water, urban runoff rushes down the stream channel, ruining natural features such as meanders and sandbars, and creates severe erosion—increasing sediment loads at the mouth while severely carving the stream bed upstream. As an example, on many Southern California beaches at the mouth of a waterway, urban runoff carries trash, pollutants, excessive silt, and other wastes, and can pose moderate to severe health hazards.

Because of fertilizer and organic waste that urban runoff often carries, eutrophication often occurs in waterways affected by this type of runoff. After heavy rains, organic matter in the waterway is relatively high compared with natural levels, spurring growth of algae blooms that soon consume most of the oxygen. Once the naturally occurring oxygen in the water is depleted, the algae blooms die, and their decomposition causes further eutrophication. These algae blooms mostly occur in areas with still water, such as stream pools and the pools behind dams, weirs, and some drop structures. Eutrophication usually comes with deadly consequences for fish and other aquatic organisms.

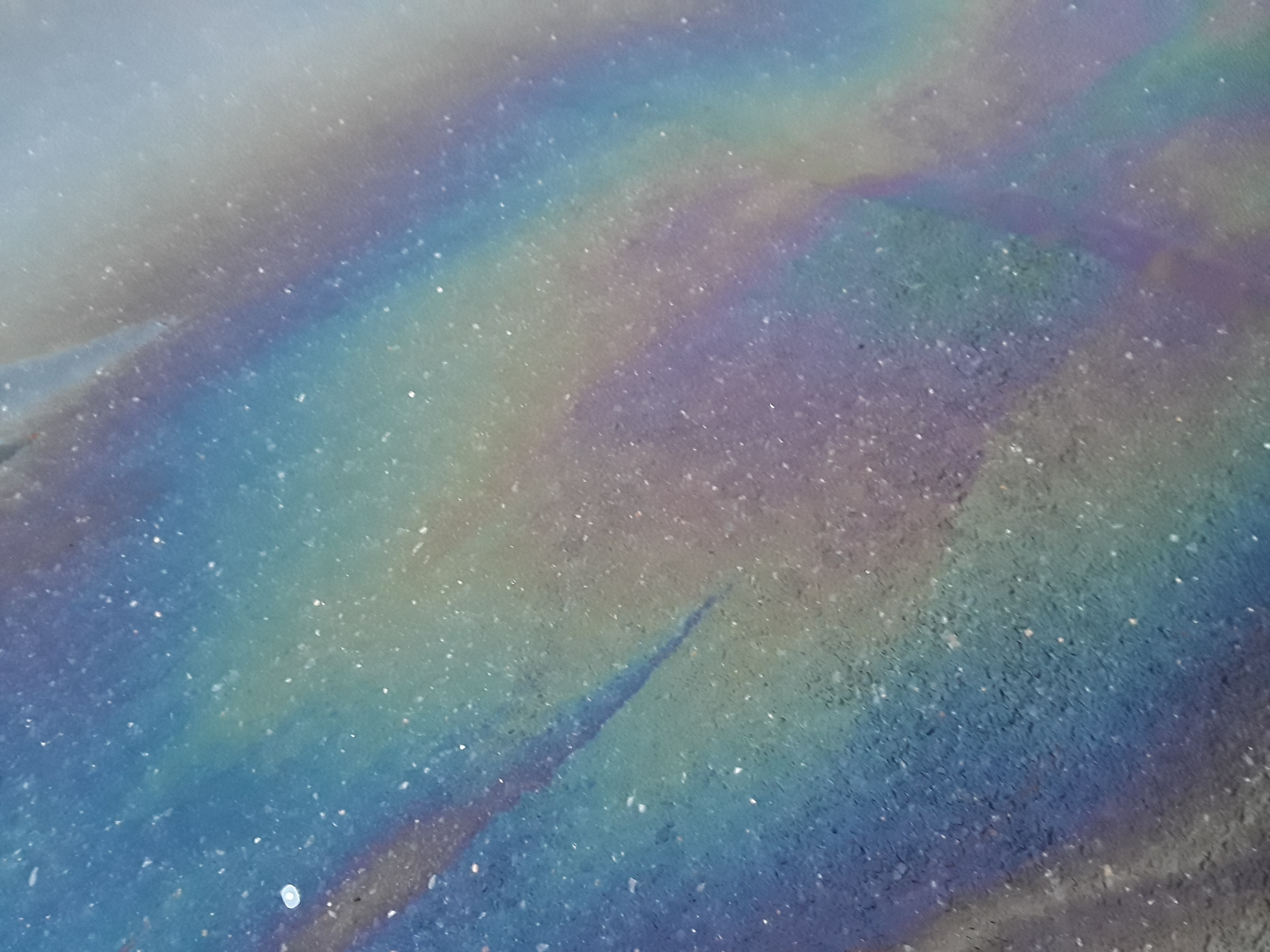
Oil slick created by runoff

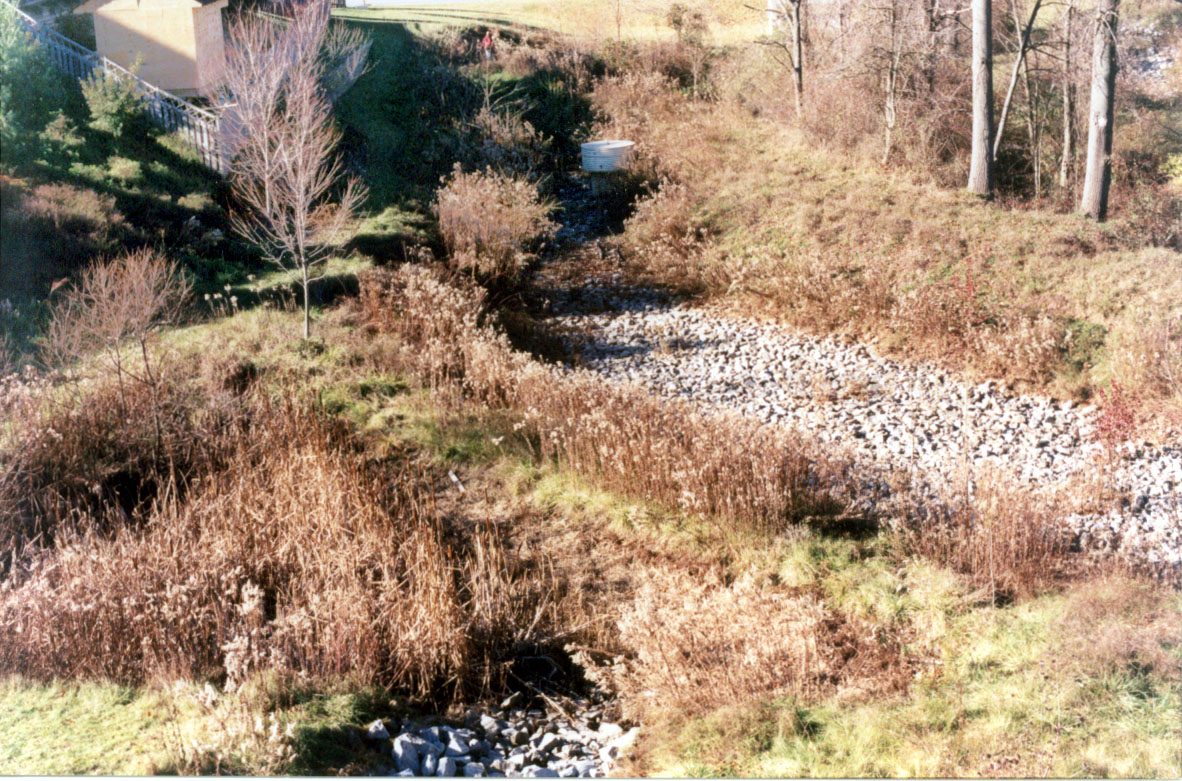
A percolation trench allows infiltration of stormwater through permeable soils into the groundwater aquifer.

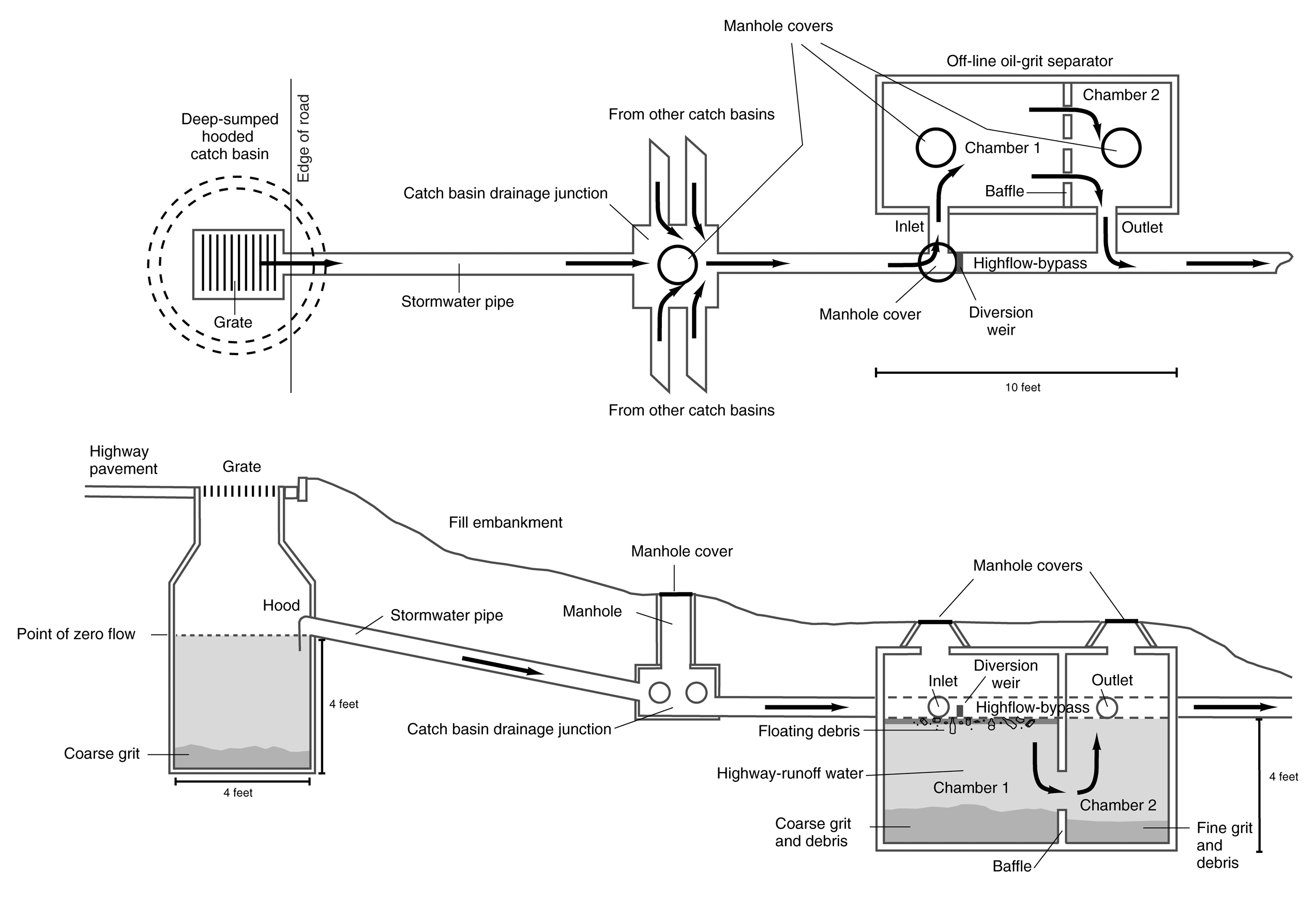
An oil-grit separator is designed to capture settleable solids, oil and grease, debris and floatables in runoff from roads and parking lots

Excessive stream bank erosion may cause flooding and property damage. For many years governments have often responded to urban stream erosion problems by modifying the streams through construction of hardened embankments and similar control structures using concrete and masonry materials. Use of these hard materials destroys habitat for fish and other animals. Such a project may stabilize the immediate area where flood damage occurred, but often it simply shifts the problem to an upstream or downstream segment of the stream. See River engineering.

There are many different ways that polluted urban runoff could harm humans, such as by contaminating drinking water, disrupting food sources and even causing parts of beaches to be closed off due to a risk of illness. After heavy rainfall events that cause stormwater overflows, contaminated water can impact waterways in which people recreate or fish, causing the beaches or water-based activities to be closed. This is because the runoff has likely caused a spike in harmful bacterial growth or inorganic chemical pollution in the water. The contaminants that we often think of as the most damaging are gasoline and oil spillage, but we often overlook the impact that fertilizers and insecticides have. When plants are watered and fields irrigated, the chemicals that lawns and crops have been treated with can be washed into the water table. The new environments that these chemicals are introduced to suffer due to their presence as they kill native vegetation, invertebrates, and vertebrates.

== Prevention and mitigation ==
Effective control of urban runoff involves reducing the velocity and flow of stormwater, as well as reducing pollutant discharges. Local governments use a variety of stormwater management techniques to reduce the effects of urban runoff. These techniques, called best management practices for water pollution (BMPs) in some countries, may focus on water quantity control, while others focus on improving water quality, and some perform both functions.

Pollution prevention practices include low impact development (LID) or green infrastructure techniques - known as Sustainable Drainage Systems (SuDS) in the UK, and Water-Sensitive Urban Design (WSUD) in Australia and the Middle East - such as the installation of green roofs and improved chemical handling (e.g. management of motor fuels & oil, fertilizers, pesticides and roadway deicers). Runoff mitigation systems include infiltration basins, bioretention systems, constructed wetlands, retention basins, and similar devices.

Providing effective urban runoff solutions often requires proper city programs that take into account the needs and differences of the community. Factors such as a city's mean temperature, precipitation levels, geographical location, and airborne pollutant levels can all affect rates of pollution in urban runoff and present unique challenges for management. Human factors such as urbanization rates, land use trends, and chosen building materials for impervious surfaces often exacerbate these issues.

The implementation of citywide maintenance strategies such as street sweeping programs can also be an effective method in improving the quality of urban runoff. Street sweeping vacuums collect particles of dust and suspended solids often found in public parking lots and roads that often end up in runoff.

Educational programs can also be an effective tool for managing urban runoff. Local businesses and individuals can have an integral role in reducing pollution in urban runoff simply through their practices, but often are unaware of regulations. Creating a productive discussion on urban runoff and the importance of effective disposal of household items can help to encourage environmentally friendly practices at a reduced cost to the city and local economy.

Thermal pollution from runoff can be controlled by stormwater management facilities that absorb the runoff or direct it into groundwater, such as bioretention systems and infiltration basins. Bioretention basins tend to be less effective at reducing temperature, as the water may be heated by the sun before being discharged to a receiving stream.

Stormwater harvesting deals with the collection of runoff from creeks, gullies, ephemeral streams, and other ground conveyances. Stormwater harvesting projects often have multiple objectives, such as reducing contaminated runoff to sensitive waters, promoting groundwater recharge, and non-potable applications such as toilet flushing and irrigation.

== See also ==
- Agricultural wastewater treatment - Nutrient runoff
- Bioretention
- Bioswale
- First flush (initial runoff of a rainstorm)
- Infiltration (hydrology)
- Nationwide Urban Runoff Program, a research project conducted by the US Environmental Protection Agency
- Nonpoint source pollution
- Permeable paving
- Rain garden
- Rainwater harvesting
- Rainwater management
- Resin-bound paving
- Riparian zone
- Surface runoff - Agricultural issues
- Tree box filter
- Water conservation
- Water demand management
