= Bioretention =

Process in which contaminants and sedimentation are removed from stormwater runoff

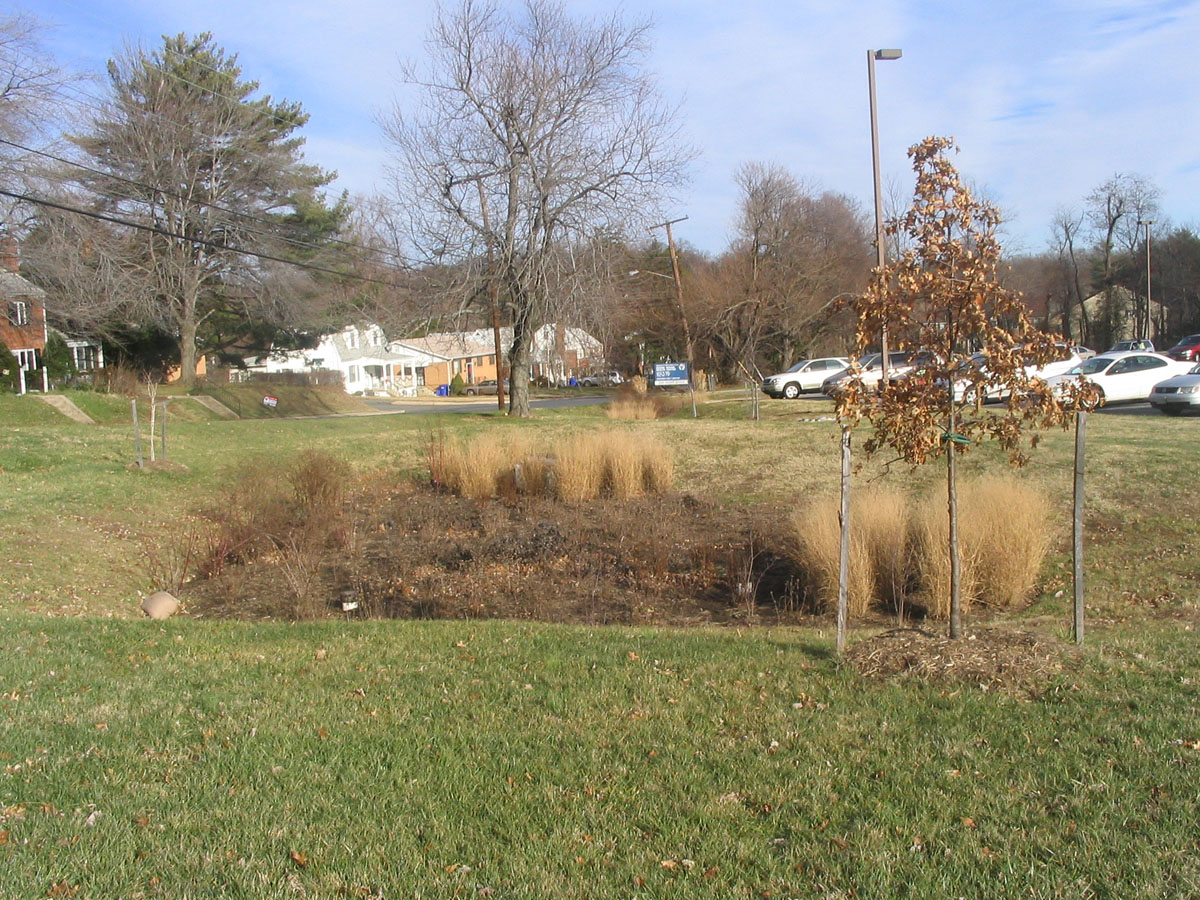
A bioretention cell, also called a rain garden, in the United States. It is designed to treat polluted stormwater runoff from an adjacent parking lot. Plants are in winter dormancy.

Bioretention is the process in which contaminants and sedimentation are removed from stormwater runoff. The main objective of the bioretention cell is to attenuate peak runoff as well as to remove stormwater runoff pollutants.

== Construction of a bioretention area ==
Stormwater is firstly directed into the designed treatment area, which conventionally consists of a sand bed (which serves as a transition to the actual soil), a filter media layer (which consists of layered materials of various composition), and plants atop the filter media. Various soil amendment such as water treatment residue (WTR), Coconut husk, biochar etc have been proposed over the years. These materials were reported to have enhanced performance in terms of pollutant removal. Runoff passes first over or through a sand bed, which slows the runoff's velocity, distributes it evenly along the length of the ponding area, which consists of a surface organic layer and/or groundcover and the underlying planting soil. Stored water in the bioretention area planting soil exfiltrates over a period of days into the underlying soils.

== Pollutant treatment mechanisms ==
The term "Bioretention" refers to the fact that the biomass in the treatment media, such as plants and bacteria, retains, absorbs, breaks down, and cycles contaminants found in runoff. It is the “bio” mass that “retains” and changes the pollutants. These biological processes are essential for transforming harmful pollutants into less toxic forms before they reach downstream water bodies. Over time, microbial communities within the soil matrix adapt to local pollutant loads, enhancing the long-term treatment efficiency of the system. Filtration, adsorption, chemical transformation, and biological degradation are the main methods of pollutant treatment in bioretention. Filtration primarily removes suspended solids, while adsorption binds dissolved contaminants to soil or organic particles. Chemical and biological mechanisms work together to reduce nutrient concentrations and degrade hydrocarbons and pathogens.

== Filtration ==
Each of the components of the bioretention area is designed to perform a specific function. The grass buffer strip reduces incoming runoff velocity and filters particulates from the runoff. The sand bed also reduces the velocity, filters particulates, and spreads flow over the length of the bioretention area. Aeration and drainage of the planting soil are provided by the 0.5 m (20 in) deep sand bed. The ponding area provides a temporary storage location for runoff prior to its evaporation or infiltration. Some particulates not filtered out by the grass filter strip or the sand bed settle within the ponding area.

The organic or mulch layer also filters pollutants and provides an environment conducive to the growth of microorganisms, which degrade petroleum-based products and other organic material. This layer acts in a similar way to the leaf litter in a forest and prevents the erosion and drying of underlying soils. Planted groundcover reduces the potential for erosion as well, slightly more effectively than mulch. The maximum sheet flow velocity prior to erosive conditions is 0.3 meters per second (1 foot per second) for planted groundcover and 0.9 meters per second (3 feet per second) for mulch.

The clay in the planting soil provides adsorption sites for hydrocarbons, heavy metals, nutrients and other pollutants. Stormwater storage is also provided by the voids in the planting soil. The stored water and nutrients in the water and soil are then available to the plants for uptake. The layout of the bioretention area is determined after site constraints such as location of utilities, underlying soils, existing vegetation, and drainage are considered. Sites with loamy sand soils are especially appropriate for bioretention because the excavated soil can be backfilled and used as the planting soil, thus eliminating the cost of importing planting soil. An unstable surrounding soil stratum and soils with a clay content greater than 25 percent may preclude the use of bioretention, as would a site with slopes greater than 20 percent or a site with mature trees that would be removed during construction of the best management practices.

== Nutrient removal and benefits ==
The main nutrients found in stormwater runoff are phosphorus and nitrogen, which are commonly generated by lawn fertilizers, leaf litter, grass clippings, unfertilized soils, detergents, air deposition, and rainfall. If left untreated, these nutrients contribute to eutrophication in downstream aquatic systems, leading to algal blooms and oxygen depletion. Bioretention media designed with optimal soil and organic content can significantly reduce both total and dissolved forms of nitrogen and phosphorus. Bioretention is valued for its compact size, affordability, and aesthetic appeal. These systems improve groundwater recharge, lower peak discharge rates and surface runoff volumes, and greatly improve stormwater quality. They also offer additional advantages habitat building, shade, noise reduction, and mitigating the effects of urban heat islands. When integrated into urban streetscapes or parking lots, bioretention systems provide green space and visual relief in otherwise impervious environments. These additional benefits make them a preferred low-impact development (LID) strategy in both new developments and retrofit applications.

== Heavy metal remediation ==
Contaminant trace metals such as zinc, lead, and copper are found in stormwater runoff from impervious surfaces (e.g. roadways and sidewalks). Treatment systems such as rain gardens and stormwater planters utilize a bioretention layer to remove heavy metals in stormwater runoff. Dissolved forms of heavy metals may bind to sediment particles in the roadway that are then captured by the bioretention system. Additionally, heavy metals may adsorb to soil particles in the bioretention media as the runoff filters through. In laboratory experiments, bioretention cells removed 94%, 88%, 95%, and >95% of zinc, copper, lead, and cadmium, respectively from water with metal concentrations typical of stormwater runoff. While this is a great benefit for water quality improvement, bioretention systems have a finite capacity for heavy metal removal. This will ultimately control the lifetime of bioretention systems, especially in areas with high heavy metal loads.

Metal removal by bioretention cells in cold climates was similar or slightly lower than that in warmer environments. Plants are less active in colder seasons, suggesting that most of the heavy metals remain in the bioretention media rather than being taken up by plant roots. Therefore, removal and replacement of the bioretention layer will become necessary in areas with heavy metal pollutants in stormwater runoff to extend the life of the treatment system.

== See also ==
- Bioswale
- Constructed wetland
- Groundwater recharge
- Infiltration basin
- Organisms involved in water purification
- Phytoremediation
- Rain garden
- Tree box filter
- Urban runoff
