= Sustainable drainage system =

Designed to reduce the potential impact of development

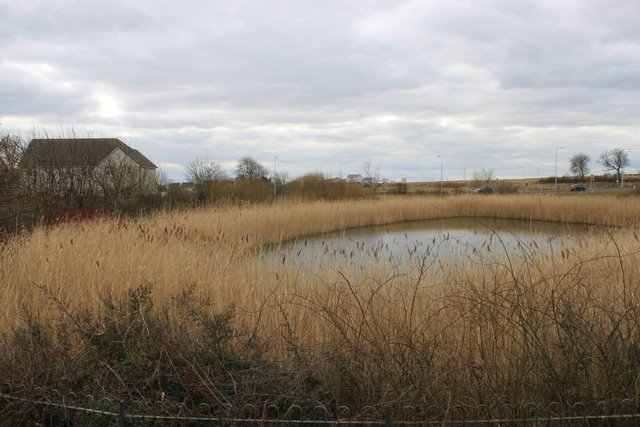
Retention ponds such as this one in Dunfermline, Scotland, are considered components of a sustainable drainage system.

Sustainable drainage systems (also known as SuDS, SUDS, or sustainable urban drainage systems) are a collection of water management practices that aim to align modern drainage systems with natural water processes and are part of a larger green infrastructure strategy. SuDS efforts make urban drainage systems more compatible with components of the natural water cycle such as storm surge overflows, soil percolation, and bio-filtration. These efforts hope to mitigate the effect human development has had or may have on the natural water cycle, particularly surface runoff and water pollution trends.

SuDS have become popular in recent decades as understanding of how urban development affects natural environments, as well as concern for climate change and sustainability, have increased. SuDS often use built components that mimic natural features in order to integrate urban drainage systems into the natural drainage systems or a site as efficiently and quickly as possible. SUDS infrastructure has become a large part of the Blue-Green Cities demonstration project in Newcastle upon Tyne.

== History of drainage systems ==
Drainage systems have been found in ancient cities over 5,000 years old, including Minoan, Indus, Persian, and Mesopotamian civilizations. These drainage systems focused mostly on reducing nuisances from localized flooding and waste water. Rudimentary systems made from brick or stone channels constituted the extent of urban drainage technologies for centuries. Cities in Ancient Rome also employed drainage systems to protect low-lying areas from excess rainfall. When builders began constructing aqueducts to import fresh water into cities, urban drainage systems became integrated into water supply infrastructure for the first time as a unified urban water cycle.

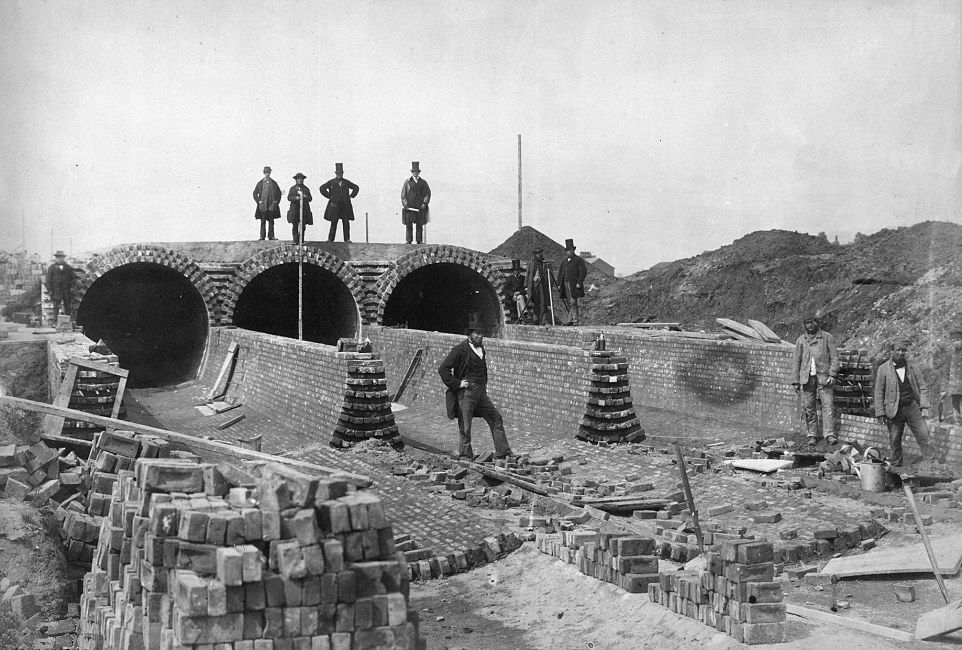
Bazzalgette combined sewer system being built in 1860, London

Modern drainage systems did not appear until the 19th century in Western Europe, although most of these systems were primarily built to deal with sewage issues rising from rapid urbanization. One such example is that of the London sewerage system, which was constructed to combat massive contamination of the River Thames. At the time, the River Thames was the primary component of London's drainage system, with human waste concentrating in the waters adjacent to the densely populated urban center. As a result, several epidemics plagued London's residents and even members of Parliament, including events known as the 1854 Broad Street cholera outbreak and the Great Stink of 1858. The concern for public health and quality of life launched several initiatives, which ultimately led to the creation of London's modern sewerage system designed by Joseph Bazalgette. This new system explicitly aimed to ensure waste water was redirected as far away from water supply sources as possible in order to reduce the threat of waterborne pathogens. Since then, most urban drainage systems have aimed for similar goals of preventing public health crises.

Within past decades, as climate change and urban flooding have become increasingly urgent challenges, drainage systems designed specifically for environmental sustainability have become more popular in both academia and practice. The first sustainable drainage system to utilize a full management train including source control in the UK was the Oxford services motorway station designed by SuDS specialists Robert Bray Associates Originally the term SUDS described the UK approach to sustainable urban drainage systems. These developments may not necessarily be in "urban" areas, and thus the "urban" part of SuDS is now usually dropped to reduce confusion. Other countries have similar approaches in place using a different terminology such as best management practice (BMP) and low-impact development in the United States, water-sensitive urban design (WSUD) in Australia, low impact urban design and development (LIUDD) in New Zealand, and comprehensive urban river basin management in Japan.

The National Research Council's definitive report on urban stormwater management described that urban drainage systems began in the United States after World War II. These structures were based on simple catch basins and pipes to transfer the water outside of the cities. Urban stormwater management started to evolve more in the 1970s when landscape architects focused more on low-impact development and began using practices such as infiltration channels. Parallel to this time, scientists started becoming concerned with other stormwater hazards surrounding pollution. Studies such as the Nationwide Urban Runoff Program showed that urban runoff contained pollutants like heavy metals, sediments, and pathogens, all of which water can pick up as it flows off of impermeable surfaces. It was at the beginning of the 21st century where stormwater infrastructure to allow runoff to infiltrate close to the source became popular. This was around the same time that the term green infrastructure was coined.

== Background ==
Traditional urban drainage systems are limited by various factors including volume capacity, damage or blockage from debris and contamination of drinking water. Many of these issues are addressed by SuDS systems by bypassing traditional drainage systems altogether and returning rainwater to natural water sources or streams as soon as possible. Increasing urbanisation has caused problems with increased flash flooding after sudden rain. As areas of vegetation are replaced by concrete, asphalt, or roofed structures, leading to impervious surfaces, the area loses its ability to absorb rainwater. This rain is instead directed into surface water drainage systems, often overloading them and causing floods.

The goal of all sustainable drainage systems is to use rainfall to recharge the water sources of a given site. These water sources are often underlying the water table, nearby streams, lakes, or other similar freshwater sources. For example, if a site is above an unconsolidated aquifer, then SuDS will aim to direct all rain that falls on the surface layer into the underground aquifer as quickly as possible. To accomplish this, SuDS use various forms of permeable layers to ensure the water is not captured or redirected to another location. Often these layers include soil and vegetation, though they can also be artificial materials.

The paradigm of SuDS solutions should be that of a system that is easy to manage, requiring little or no energy input (except from environmental sources such as sunlight, etc.), resilient to use, and being environmentally as well as aesthetically attractive. Examples of this type of system are basins (shallow landscape depressions that are dry most of the time when it is not raining), rain gardens (shallow landscape depressions with shrub or herbaceous planting), swales (shallow normally-dry, wide-based ditches), filter drains (gravel filled trench drain), bioretention basins (shallow depressions with gravel and/or sand filtration layers beneath the growing medium), reed beds and other wetland habitats that collect, store, and filter dirty water along with providing a habitat for wildlife.

A common misconception of SuDS is that they reduce flooding on the development site. In fact the SuDS is designed to reduce the impact that the surface water drainage system of one site has on other sites. For instance, sewer flooding is a problem in many places. Paving or building over land can result in flash flooding. This happens when flows entering a sewer exceed its capacity and it overflows. The SuDS system aims to minimise or eliminate discharges from the site, thus reducing the impact, the idea being that if all development sites incorporated SuDS then urban sewer flooding would be less of a problem. Unlike traditional urban stormwater drainage systems, SuDS can also help to protect and enhance ground water quality.

== Example features ==
Because SuDS describe a collection of systems with similar components or goals, there is a large crossover between SuDS and other terminologies dealing with sustainable urban development. The following are examples generally accepted as components in a SuDS system:

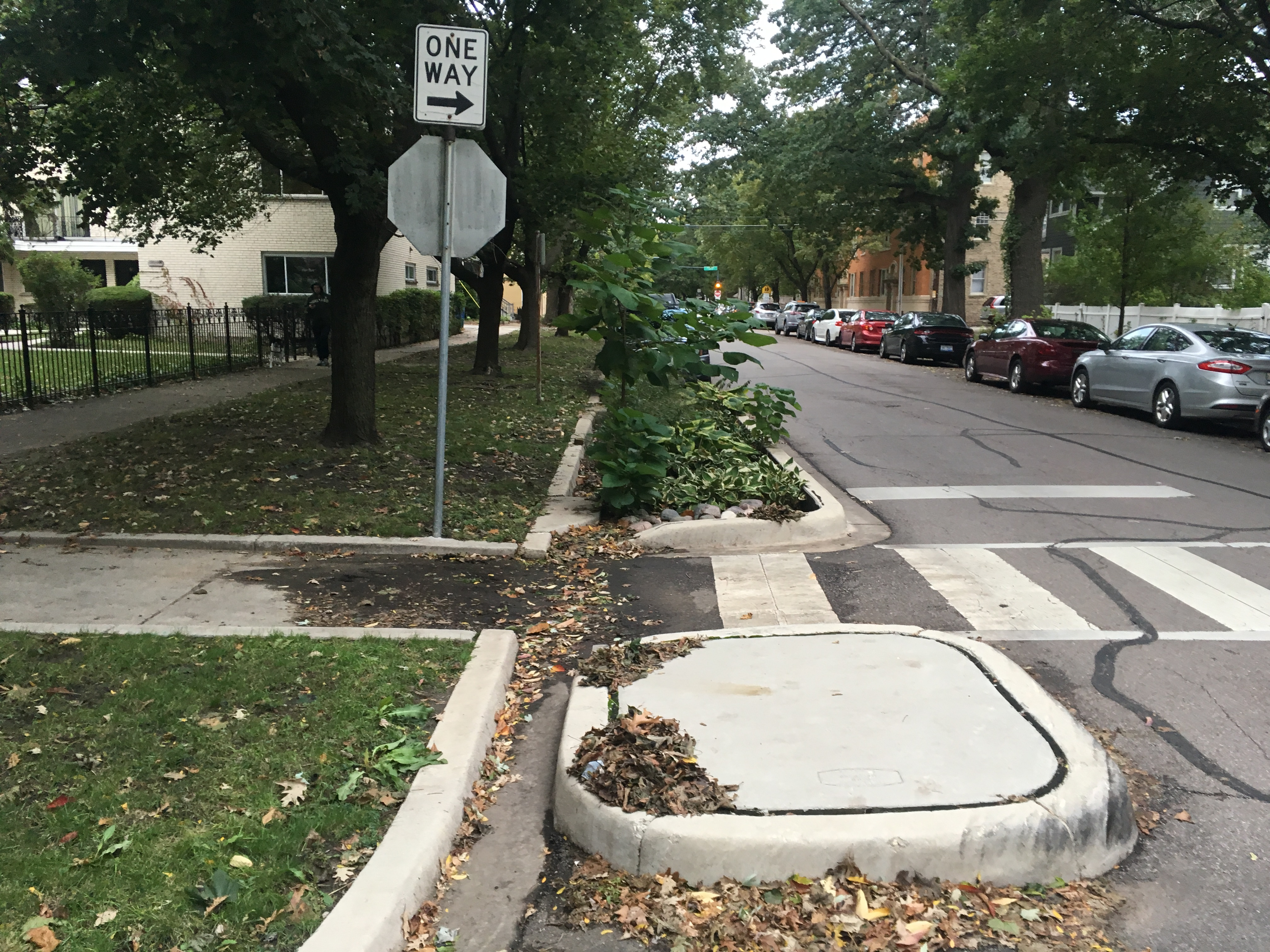
Roadside bioswale designed to filter storm water runoff from street surfaces

=== Bioswales ===
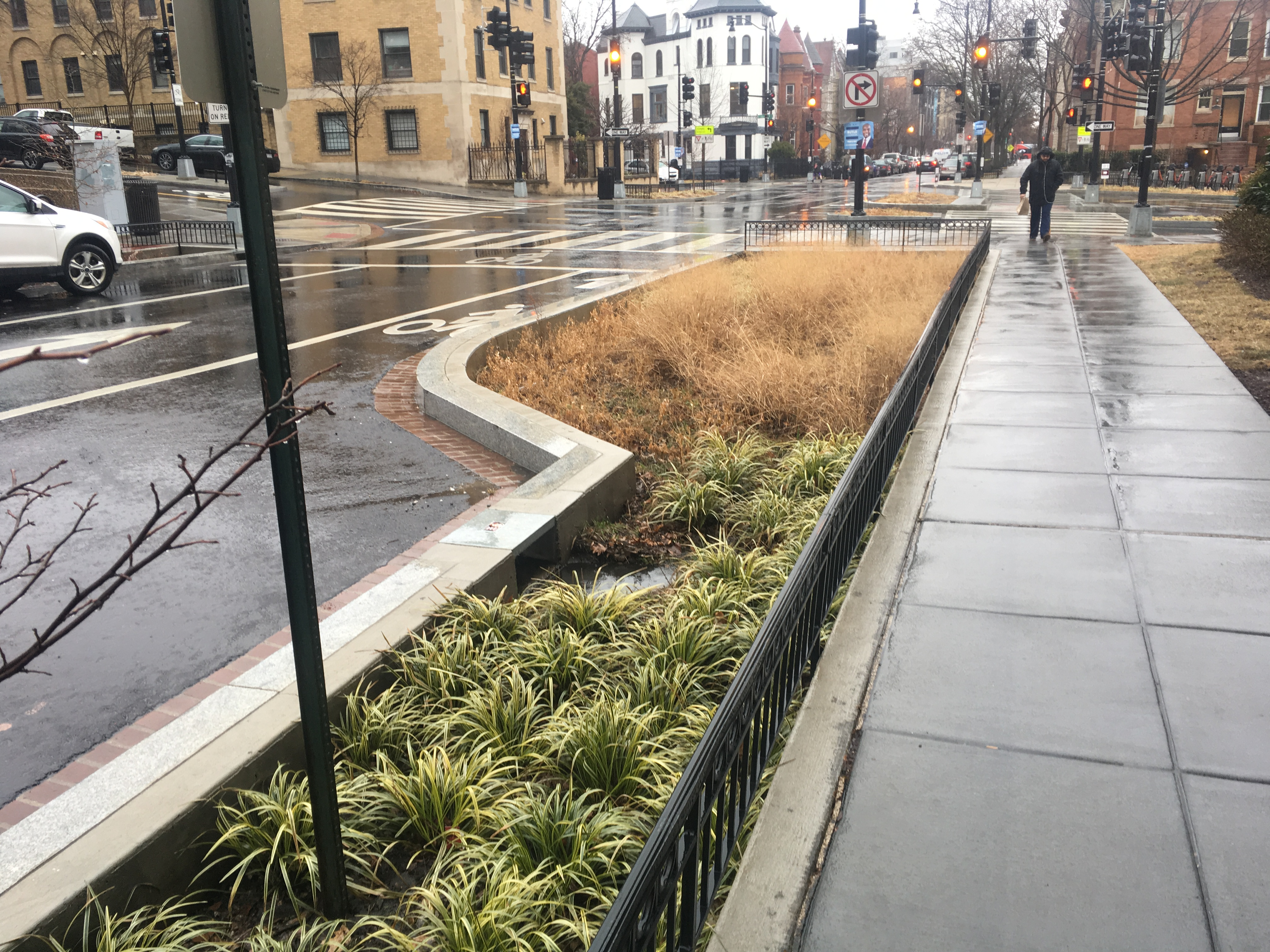
Runoff from the vicinity flows into an adjacent bioswale

Bioswales are channels designed to concentrate and convey stormwater runoff while removing debris and pollution. Bioswales can also be beneficial in recharging groundwater, reducing flooding and erosion, and creating a valuable habitat for pollinators.

Bioswales are typically vegetated, mulched, or xeriscaped. They consist of a swaled drainage course with gently sloped sides (less than 6%). Bioswale design is intended to safely maximize the time water spends in the swale, which aids the collection and removal of pollutants, silt and debris. Depending on the site topography, the bioswale channel may be straight or meander. Check dams are also commonly added along the bioswale to increase stormwater infiltration. A bioswale's make-up can be influenced by many different variables, including climate, rainfall patterns, site size, budget, and vegetation suitability.

It is important to maintain bioswales to ensure the best possible efficiency and effectiveness in removal of pollutants from stormwater runoff. Planning for maintenance is an important step, which can include the introduction of filters or large rocks to prevent clogging. Annual maintenance through soil testing, visual inspection, and mechanical testing is also crucial to the health of a bioswale.

Bioswales are commonly applied along streets and around parking lots, where substantial automotive pollution settles on the pavement and is flushed by the first instance of rain, known as the first flush. Bioswales, or other types of biofilters, can be created around the edges of parking lots to capture and treat stormwater runoff before releasing it to the watershed or storm sewer.

=== Permeable pavement ===
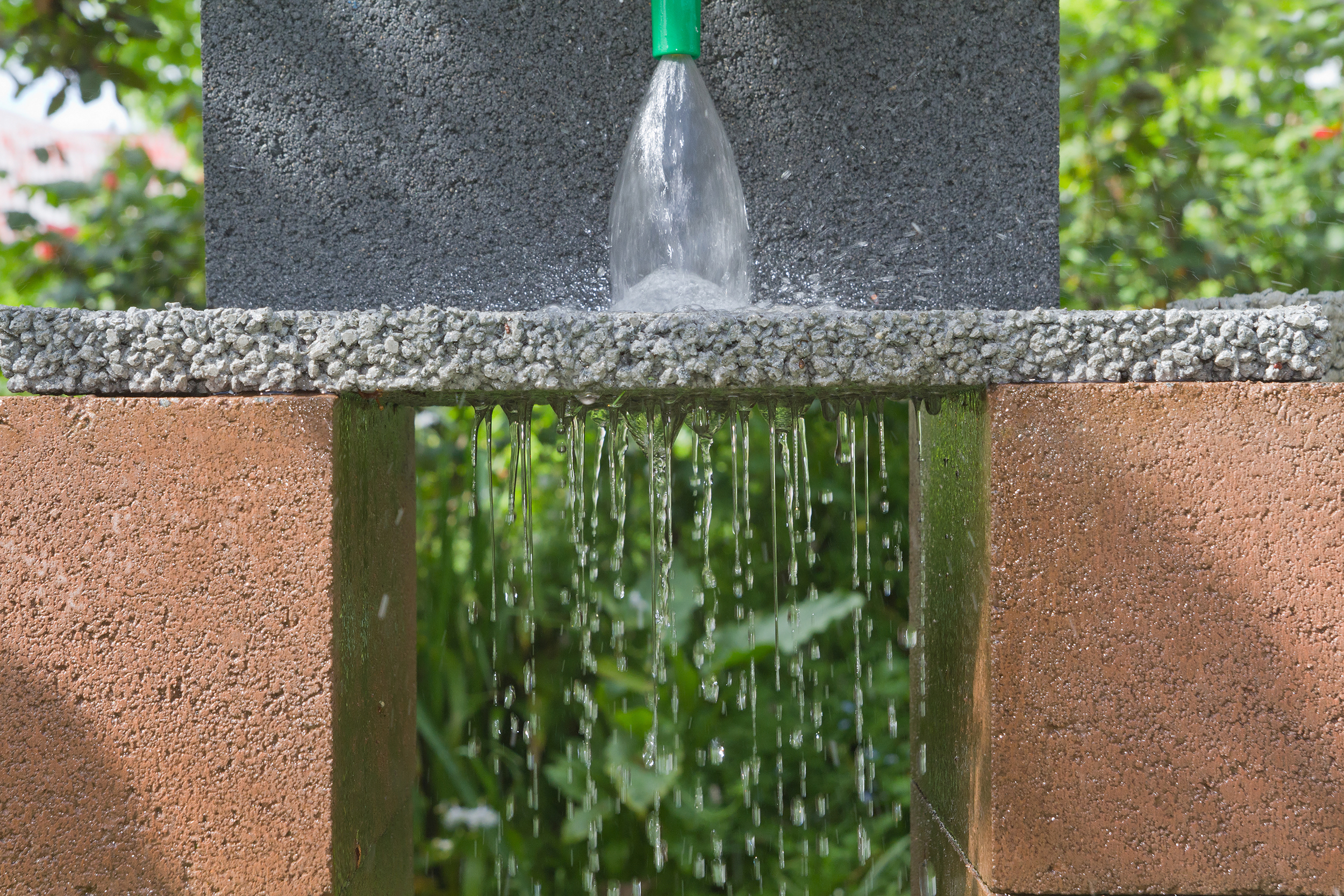
Permeable paving demonstration

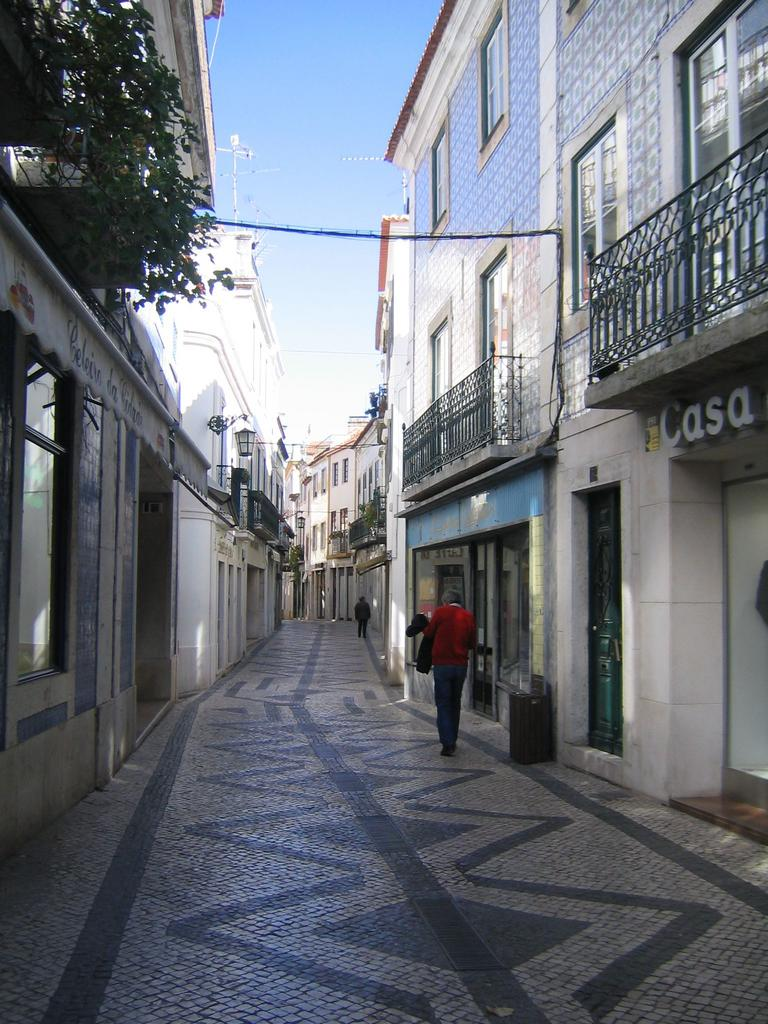
Stone paving in Santarém, Portugal

Permeable paving surfaces are made of either a porous material that enables stormwater to flow through it or nonporous blocks spaced so that water can flow between the gaps. Permeable paving can also include a variety of surfacing techniques for roads, parking lots, and pedestrian walkways. Permeable pavement surfaces may be composed of; pervious concrete, porous asphalt, paving stones, or interlocking pavers. Unlike traditional impervious paving materials such as concrete and asphalt, permeable paving systems allow stormwater to percolate and infiltrate through the pavement and into the aggregate layers and/or soil below. In addition to reducing surface runoff, permeable paving systems can trap suspended solids, thereby filtering pollutants from stormwater.

Permeable pavement is commonly used on roads, paths and parking lots subject to light vehicular traffic, such as cycle-paths, service or emergency access lanes, road and airport shoulders, and residential sidewalks and driveways.

=== Wetlands ===
Artificial wetlands can be constructed in areas that see large volumes of storm water surges or runoff. Built to replicate shallow marshes, wetlands as BMPs gather and filter water at scales larger than bioswales or rain gardens. Unlike bioswales, artificial wetlands are designed to replicate natural wetlands processes as opposed to having an engineered mechanism within the artificial wetland. Because of this, the ecology of the wetland (soil components, water, vegetation, microbes, sunlight processes, etc.) becomes the primary system to remove pollutants. Water in an artificial wetland tends to be filtered slowly in comparison to systems with mechanized or explicitly engineered components.

Wetlands can be used to concentrate large volumes of runoff from urban areas and neighborhoods. In 2012, the South Los Angeles Wetlands Park was constructed in a densely populated inner-city district as a renovation for a former LA Metro bus yard. The park is designed to capture runoff from surrounding surfaces as well as storm water overflow from the city's current drainage system.

=== Retention basins ===
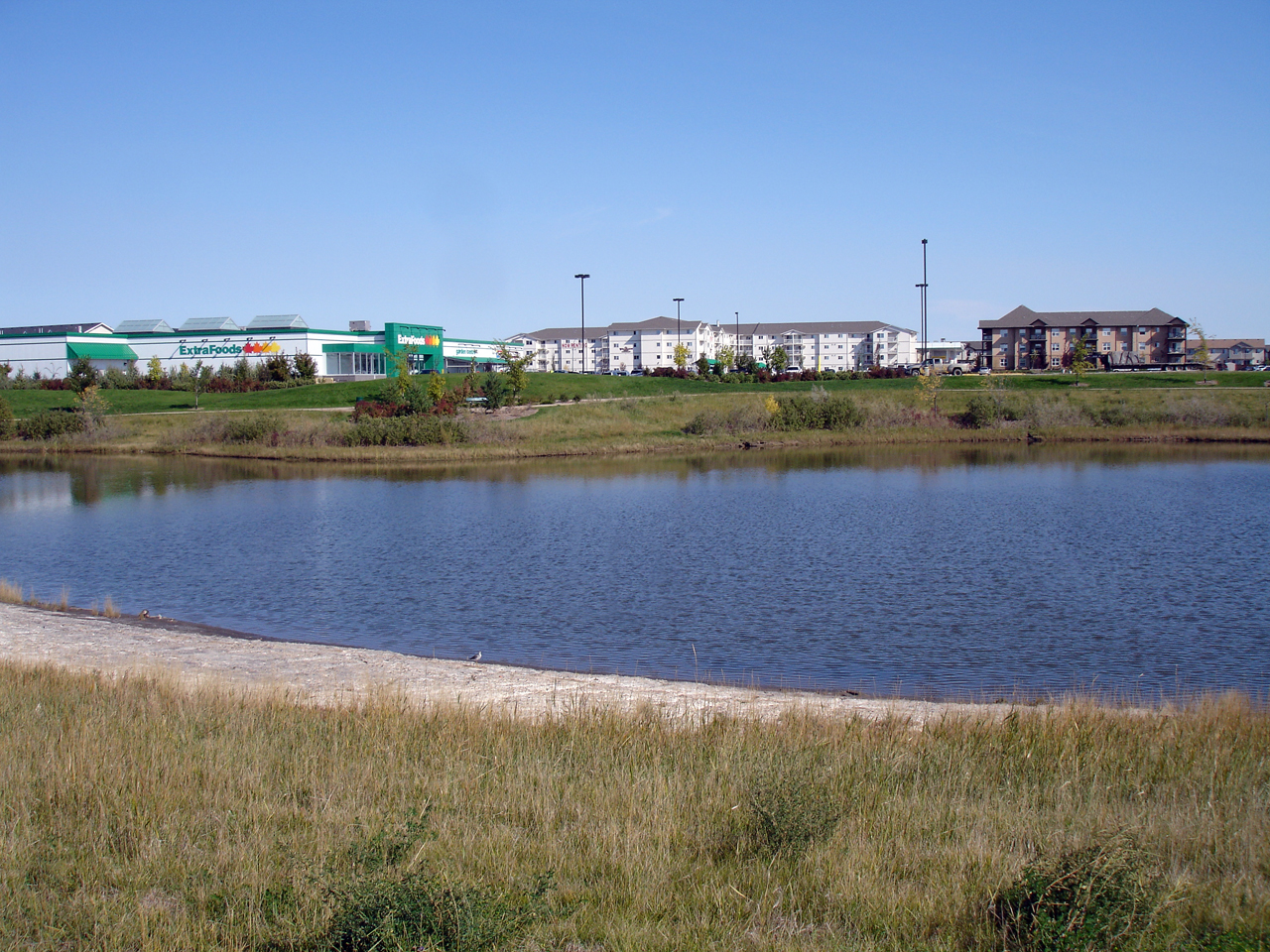
Trounce Pond, a retention basin landscaped with natural grassland plants, in Saskatoon, Saskatchewan, Canada

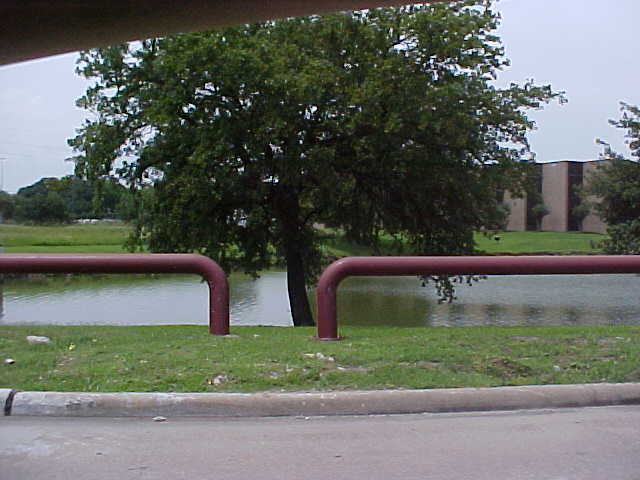
The Corporate Park retention basin in Stafford, Texas, United States

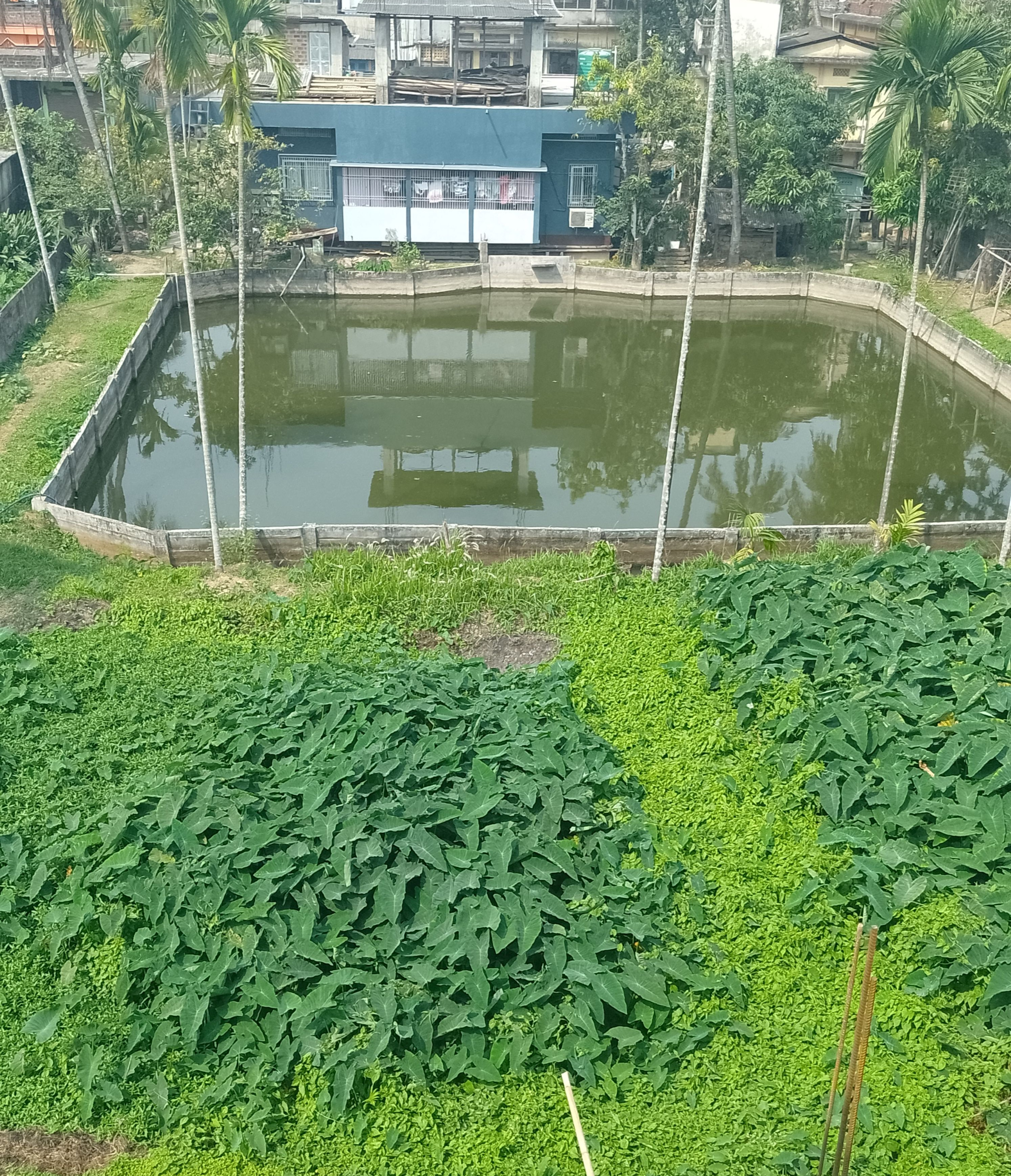
A retention pond guarded by concrete wall and surrounded by taro plants in an semi-urban Indian town

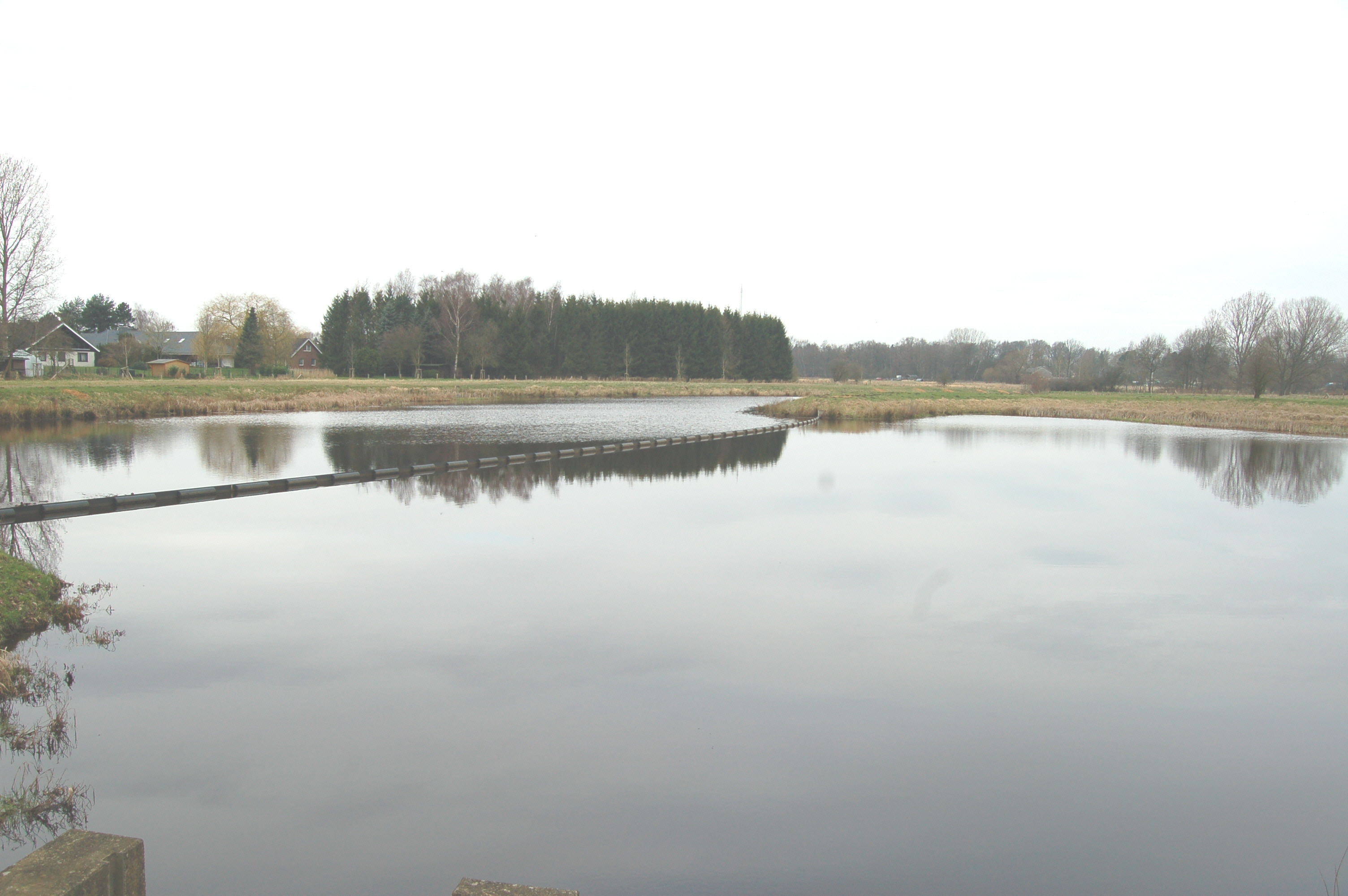
Retention basin in Pinnau, Schleswig-Holstein, Germany

A retention basin, sometimes called a retention pond, wet detention basin, or storm water management pond (SWMP), is an artificial pond with vegetation around the perimeter and a permanent pool of water in its design. It is used to manage stormwater runoff, for protection against flooding, for erosion control, and to serve as an artificial wetland and improve the water quality in adjacent bodies of water.

It is distinguished from a detention basin, sometimes called a "dry pond", which temporarily stores water after a storm, but eventually empties out at a controlled rate to a downstream water body. It also differs from an infiltration basin which is designed to direct stormwater to groundwater through permeable soils.

Wet ponds are frequently used for water quality improvement, groundwater recharge, flood protection, aesthetic improvement, or any combination of these. Sometimes they act as a replacement for the natural absorption of a forest or other natural process that was lost when an area is developed. As such, these structures are designed to blend into neighborhoods and viewed as an amenity.

In urban areas, impervious surfaces (roofs, roads) reduce the time spent by rainfall before entering into the stormwater drainage system. If left unchecked, this will cause widespread flooding downstream. The function of a stormwater pond is to contain this surge and release it slowly. This slow release mitigates the size and intensity of storm-induced flooding on downstream receiving waters. Stormwater ponds also collect suspended sediments, which are often found in high concentrations in stormwater due to upstream construction and sand applications to roadways.

=== Green roofs ===
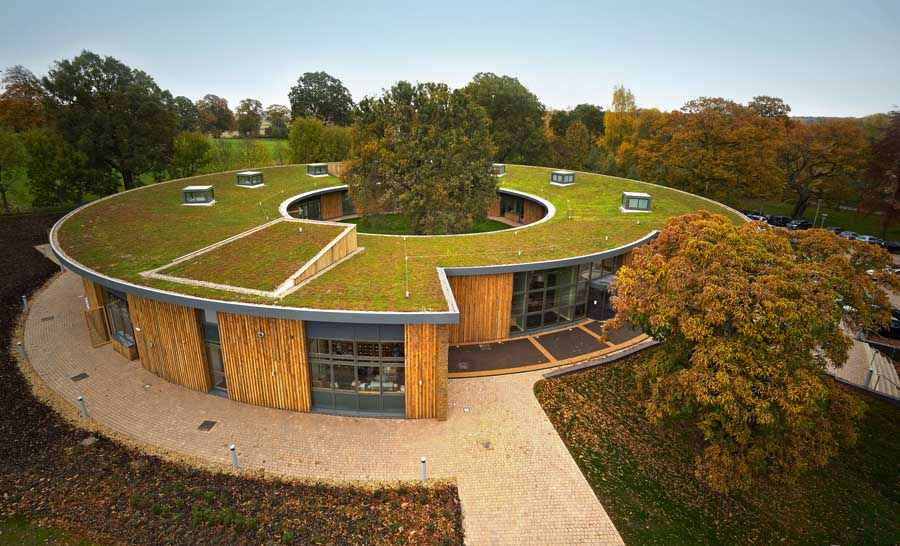
Green roof at the British Horse Society headquarters.

A green roof or living roof is a roof of a building that is partially or completely covered with vegetation and a growing medium, planted over a waterproofing membrane. It may also include additional layers such as a root barrier and drainage, and irrigation systems. Container gardens on roofs, where plants are maintained in pots, are not generally considered to be true green roofs, although this is debated. Rooftop ponds are another form of green roofs, which are used to treat greywater. Vegetation, soil, drainage layer, roof barrier, and irrigation system constitute the green roof.

Green roofs serve several purposes for a building, such as absorbing rainwater, providing insulation, creating a habitat for wildlife, and decreasing stress of the people around the roof by providing a more aesthetically pleasing landscape, and helping to lower urban air temperatures and mitigate the heat island effect. Green roofs are suitable for retrofit or redevelopment projects as well as new buildings and can be installed on small garages or larger industrial, commercial and municipal buildings. They effectively use the natural functions of plants to filter water and treat air in urban and suburban landscapes. There are two types of green roof: intensive roofs, which are thicker, with a minimum depth of 12.8 cm (5 1/16 in), and can support a wider variety of plants but are heavier and require more maintenance, and extensive roofs, which are shallow, ranging in depth from 2 to 12.7 cm (13/16 to 5 in), lighter than intensive green roofs, and require minimal maintenance.

The term green roof may also be used to indicate roofs that use some form of green technology, such as a cool roof, a roof with solar thermal collectors or photovoltaic panels. Green roofs are also referred to as eco-roofs, oikosteges, vegetated roofs, living roofs, greenroofs and VCP_{H} (Horizontal Vegetated Complex Partitions).

=== Rain gardens ===
Rain gardens are a form of stormwater management using water capture. Rain gardens are shallow depressed areas in the landscape, planted with shrubs and plants that are used to collect rainwater from roofs or pavement and allows for the stormwater to slowly infiltrate into the ground. Rain gardens mimic natural landscape functions by capturing stormwater, filtering out pollutants, and recharging groundwater. A study done in 2008 explains how rain gardens and stormwater planters are easy to incorporate into urban areas where they will improve the streets by minimizing the effects of drought and helping out with stormwater runoff. Stormwater planters can easily fit between other street landscapes and ideal in areas where spacing is tight.

=== Downspout disconnection ===
Downspout disconnection is a form of green infrastructure that separates roof downspouts from the sewer system and redirects roof water runoff into permeable surfaces. It can be used for storing stormwater or allowing the water to penetrate the ground. Downspout disconnection is especially beneficial in cities with combined sewer systems. With high volumes of rain, downspouts on buildings can send 12 gallons of water a minute into the sewer system, which increases the risk of basement backups and sewer overflows.

== Benefits for stormwater management ==
Green infrastructure keeps waterways clean and healthy in two primary ways; water retention and water quality. Different green infrastructure strategies prevents runoff by capturing the rain where it lies, allowing it to filter into the ground to recharge groundwater, return to the atmosphere through evapotranspiration, or be reused for another purpose like landscaping. Water quality is also improved by decreasing the amount of stormwater that reaches other waterways and removing contaminants. Vegetation and soil help capture and remove pollutants from stormwater in many ways like adsorption, filtration, and plant uptake. These processes break down or capture many of the common pollutants found in runoff.

=== Reduced flooding ===
With climate change intensifying, heavy storms are becoming more frequent and so is the increasing risk of flooding and sewer system overflows. According to the EPA, the average size of a 100-year floodplain is likely to increase by 45% in the next ten years. Another growing problem is urban flooding being caused by too much rain on impervious surfaces, urban floods can destroy neighborhoods. They particularly affect minority and low-income neighborhoods and can leave behind health problems like asthma and illness caused by mold. Green infrastructure reduces flood risks and bolsters the climate resiliency of communities by keeping rain out of sewers and waterways, capturing it where it falls.

=== Increased water supply ===
More than half of the rain that falls in urban areas covered mostly by impervious surfaces ends up as runoff. Green infrastructure practices reduce runoff by capturing stormwater and allowing it to recharge groundwater supplies or be harvested for purposes like landscaping. Green infrastructure promotes rainfall conservation through the use of capture methods and infiltration techniques, for instance bioswales. As much as 75 percent of the rainfall that lands on a rooftop can be captured and used for other purposes.

=== Heat management ===
A city with miles of dark hot pavement absorbs and radiates heat into the surrounding atmosphere at a greater rate than a natural landscapes do. This is urban heat island effect causing an increase in air temperatures. The EPA estimates that the average air temperature of a city with one million people or more can be 1.8 to 5.4 °F (1.0 to 3.0 °C) warmer than surrounding areas. Higher temperatures reduce air quality by increasing smog. In Los Angeles, a 1 degree temperature increase makes the air roughly 3 percent more smog. Green roofs and other forms of green infrastructure help improve air quality and reduce smog through their use of vegetation. Plants not only provide shade for cooling, but also absorb pollutants like carbon dioxide and help reduce air temperatures through evaporation and evapotranspiration.

=== Health benefits ===
By improving water quality, reducing air temperatures and pollution, green infrastructure provides many public health benefits. Cooler and cleaner air can help reduce heat related illnesses like exhaustion and heatstroke, as well as respiratory problems like asthma. Cleaner and healthier waterways also means less illness from contaminated waters and seafood. Greener areas also promote physical activity and can boost mental health.

=== Reduced costs ===
Green infrastructure is often cheaper than more conventional water management strategies. Philadelphia found that its new green infrastructure plan will cost $1.2 billion over 25 years, compared with the $6 billion a gray infrastructure would have cost. The expenses for implementing green infrastructure are often smaller, planting a rain garden to deal with drainage costs less than digging tunnels and installing pipes. But even when it is not cheaper, green infrastructure still has a good long-term effect. A green roof lasts twice as long as a regular roof, and low maintenance costs of permeable pavement can make for a good long-term investment. The Iowa town of West Union determined it could save $2.5 million over the lifespan of a single parking lot by using permeable pavement instead of traditional asphalt. Green infrastructure also improves the quality of water drawn from rivers and lakes for drinking, which reduces the costs associated with purification and treatment, in some cases by more than 25 percent. And green roofs can reduce heating and cooling costs, leading to energy savings of as much as 15 percent.

== See also ==
- Aquifer storage and recovery
- Blue roof
- French drain
- Low-impact development (U.S. and Canada)
- Resin-bound paving
- Retention basin
- Sponge city
- Stream restoration
- Sustainable city
- Tree box filter
- Urban runoff
