= Roofing =

Roofing can mean:

- Roofing material, used in the construction of a roof
- Rooftopping, roof hacking for high risk photos
- The profession of a roofer
- Roofing, a property of languages and dialects

== See also ==
- Roof, for general description of roofs and roofing
- Blue roof
- Green roof
