= NURP =

NURP may refer to:

- National Undersea Research Program
- Nationwide Urban Runoff Program
