= Permeable paving =

Roads built with water-pervious materials

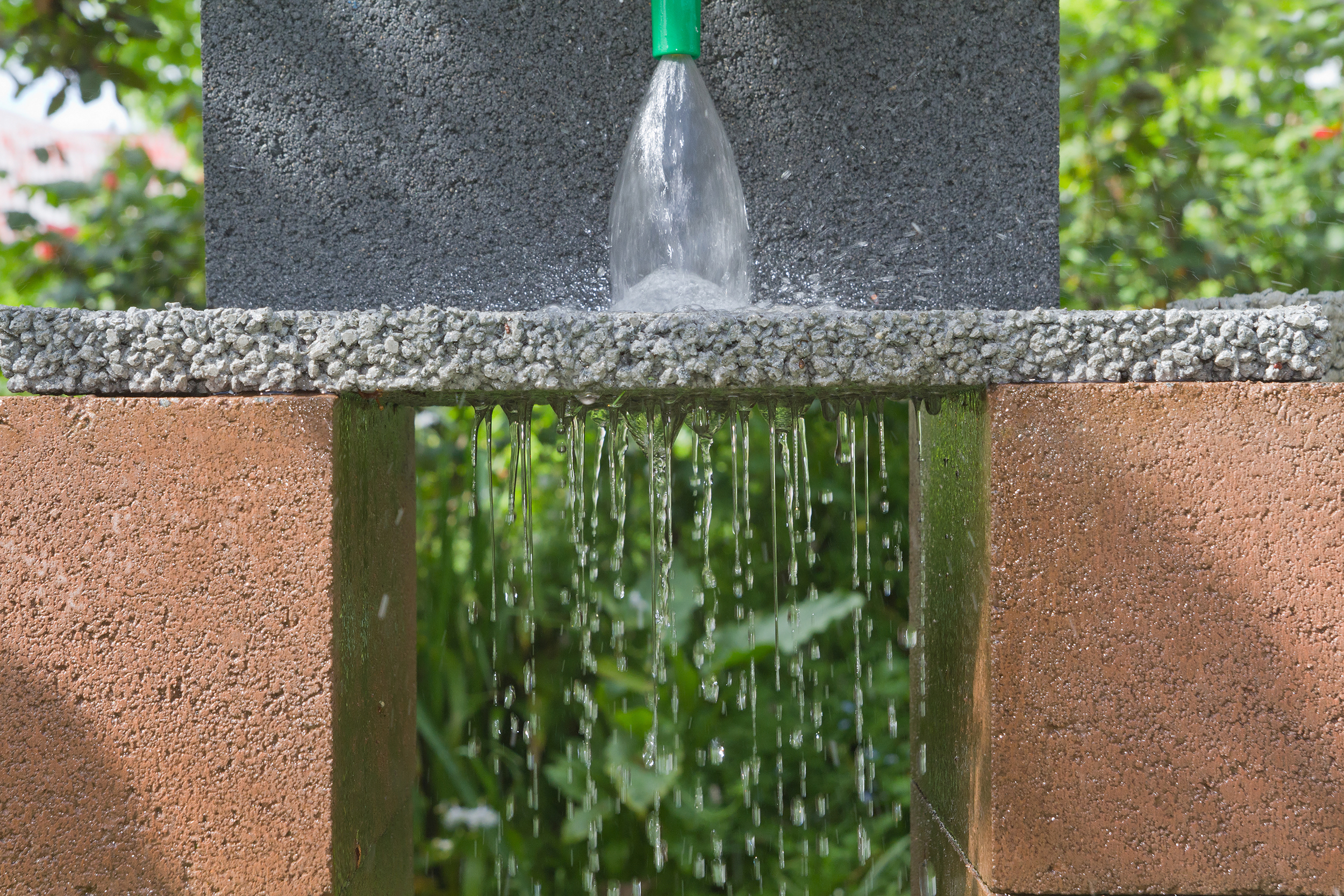
Permeable paving demonstration

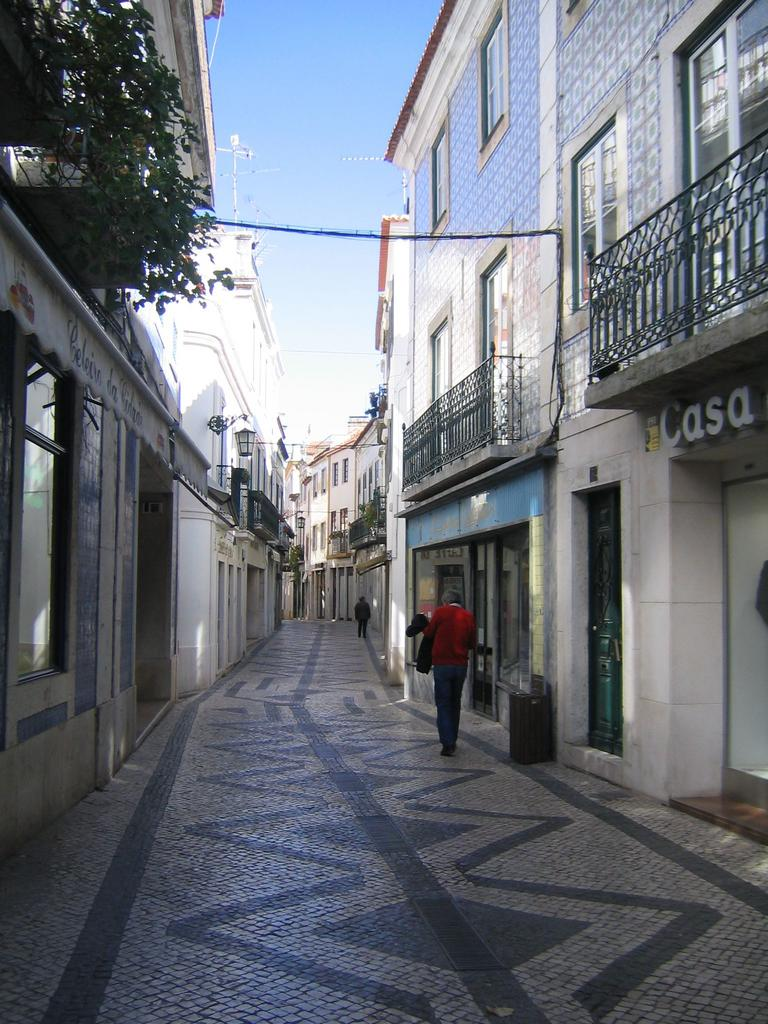
Stone paving in Santarém, Portugal

Permeable paving surfaces are made of either a porous material that enables stormwater to flow through it or nonporous blocks spaced so that water can flow between the gaps. Permeable paving can also include a variety of surfacing techniques for roads, parking lots, and pedestrian walkways. Permeable pavement surfaces may be composed of; pervious concrete, porous asphalt, paving stones, or interlocking pavers. Unlike traditional impervious paving materials such as concrete and asphalt, permeable paving systems allow stormwater to percolate and infiltrate through the pavement and into the aggregate layers and/or soil below. In addition to reducing surface runoff, permeable paving systems can trap suspended solids, thereby filtering pollutants from stormwater.

Permeable pavement is commonly used on roads, paths and parking lots subject to light vehicular traffic, such as cycle-paths, service or emergency access lanes, road and airport shoulders, and residential sidewalks and driveways.

== Description and applications ==
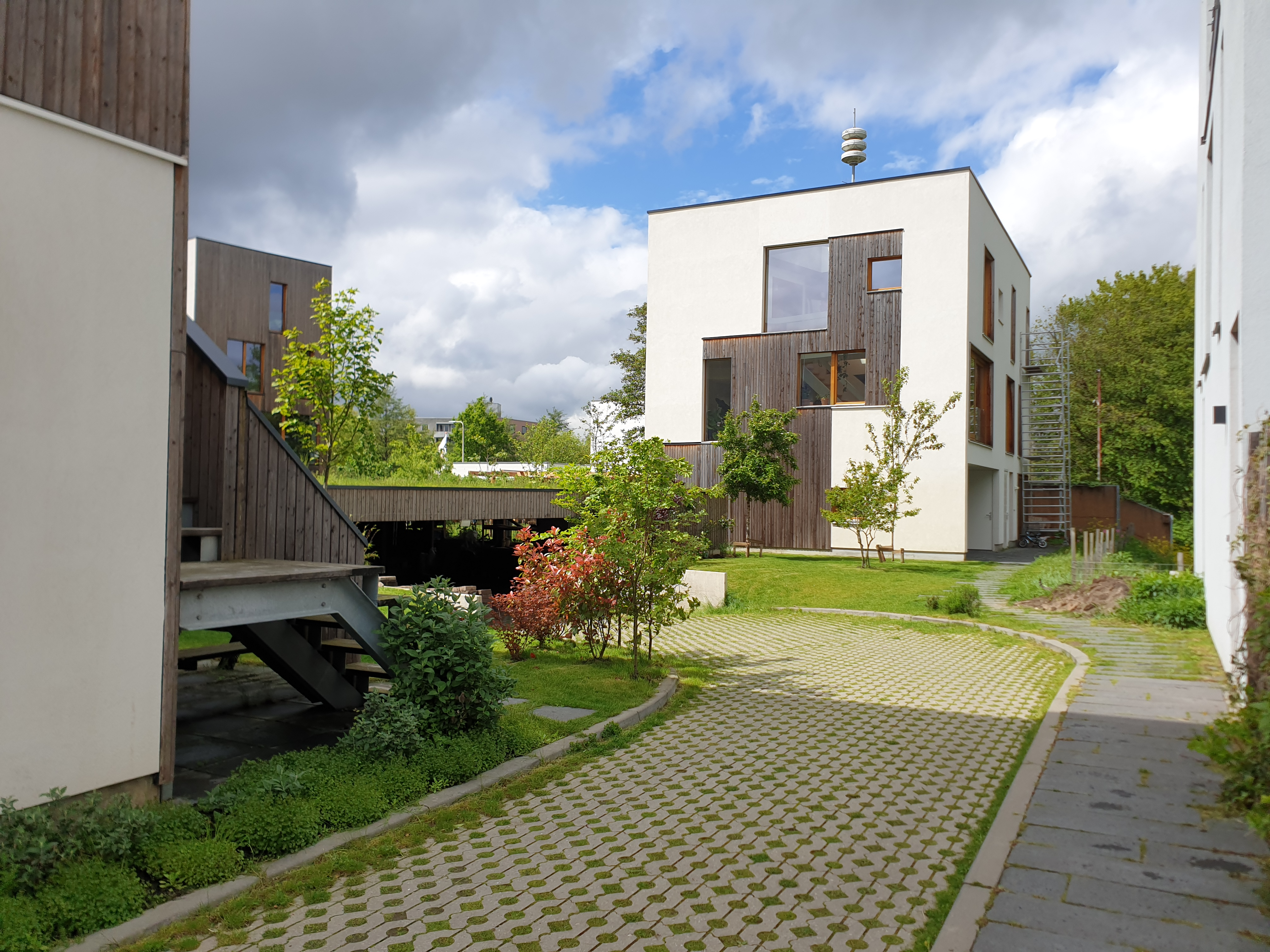
Grass pavers being used for a permeable driveway in the Netherlands

Permeable solutions can be based on porous asphalt and concrete surfaces, concrete pavers (permeable interlocking concrete paving systems – PICP), or polymer-based grass pavers, grids and geocells. Porous pavements such as pervious concrete and pervious asphalt are better suited for urbanized areas that see more frequent vehicular traffic, while concrete pavers, grids, and geocells are better suited for light vehicular traffic, pedestrian and cycling pathways, and overflow parking lots. Pervious concrete pavers allow water to percolate and infiltrate through the pavers and into the aggregate layers and/or soil below. Impervious concrete pavers installed with ample void space between each paver function in the same way as pervious concrete pavers as they enable stormwater to drain into the voids between each paver, either filled with coarse aggregate or vegetation, to a stone and/or soil base layer for on-site infiltration and filtering. Polymer based grass grid or cellular paver systems provide load bearing reinforcement for unpaved surfaces of gravel or turf.

Grass pavers, plastic turf reinforcing grids (PTRG), and geocells (cellular confinement systems) are honeycombed 3D grid-cellular systems, made of thin-walled HDPE plastic or other polymer alloys. These provide grass reinforcement, ground stabilization and gravel retention. The 3D structure reinforces infill and transfers vertical loads from the surface, distributing them over a wider area. Selection of the type of cellular grid depends to an extent on the surface material, traffic and loads. The cellular grids are installed on a prepared base layer of open-graded stone (higher void spacing) or engineered stone (stronger). The surface layer may be compacted gravel or topsoil seeded with grass and fertilizer. In addition to load support, the cellular grid reduces compaction of the soil to maintain permeability, while the roots improve permeability due to their root channels.

In new suburban growth, porous pavements protect watersheds by delaying and filtering the surge flow. In existing built-up areas and towns, redevelopment and reconstruction are opportunities to implement stormwater water management practices. Permeable paving is an important component in Low Impact Development (LID), a process for land development in the United States that attempts to minimize impacts on water quality and the similar concept of sustainable drainage systems (SuDS) in the United Kingdom.

The infiltration capacity of the native soil is a key design consideration for determining the depth of base rock for stormwater storage or for whether an underdrain system is needed.

== Advantages ==
=== Managing runoff ===
Permeable paving surfaces have been demonstrated as effective in managing runoff from paved surfaces and recharging groundwater aquifers. Large volumes of urban runoff causes serious erosion and siltation in surface water bodies. Permeable pavers provide a solid ground surface, strong enough to take heavy loads, like large vehicles, while at the same time they allow water to filter through the surface and reach the underlying soils, mimicking natural ground absorption. They can reduce downstream flooding and stream bank erosion, and maintain base flows in rivers to keep ecosystems self-sustaining. Permeable pavers also combat erosion that occurs when grass is dry or dead, by replacing grassed areas in suburban and residential environments. The goal is to control stormwater at the source, reduce runoff and improve water quality by filtering pollutants in the subsurface layers.

=== Controlling pollutants ===
To control pollutants found in surface runoff, permeable paving surfaces capture the stormwater in the soil or aggregate base below the road or pathway, and subsequently treat the runoff via percolation, which allows water to infiltrate, supporting groundwater recharge or contain the stormwater to be released back into municipal stormwater management systems after a storm. Permeable paving systems have shown effective in reducing suspended solids, Biochemical Oxygen Demand (BOD), chemical oxygen demand, and ammonium concentrations within groundwater. In areas where infiltration is not possible due to unsuitable soil conditions, permeable pavements are used in the attenuation mode where water is retained in the pavement and slowly released to surface water systems between storm events.

=== Trees ===
Permeable pavements may give urban trees the rooting space they need to grow to full size. A "structural-soil" pavement base combines structural aggregate with soil; a porous surface admits vital air and water to the rooting zone. This integrates healthy ecology and thriving cities, with the living tree canopy above, the city's traffic on the ground, and living tree roots below. The benefits of permeables on urban tree growth have not been conclusively demonstrated and many researchers have observed tree growth is not increased if construction practices compact materials before permeable pavements are installed.

=== Reducing heat island effect ===
Research findings indicate that employing high albedo (reflective) and permeable pavement has the potential to alleviate near-surface heat island effects and enhance air quality, while also potentially improving human thermal comfort. In comparison to impermeable pavement, permeable pavement exhibits minimal thermal impact on the near-surface air due to its capacity for heat exchange.

== Disadvantages ==
=== Runoff volumes ===
Permeable pavements are designed to replace Effective Impervious Areas (EIAs), but can be used, in some cases, to manage stormwater from other impervious surfaces on site. Use of this technique must be part of an overall on site management system for stormwater, and is not a replacement for other techniques.

During large storm events, the water table below the porous pavement can rise to a higher level, preventing the precipitation from being absorbed into the ground. Some additional water is stored in the open graded or crushed drain rock base, and remains until the subgrade can absorb the water. For clay-based soils, or other low to 'non'-draining soils, it is important to increase the depth of the crushed drain rock base to allow additional capacity for the water as it waits to be infiltrated.

=== Pollutant load ===
Runoff across some land uses may become contaminated, where pollutant concentrations exceed those typically found in stormwater. These "hot spots" include commercial plant nurseries, recycling facilities, fueling stations, industrial storage, marinas, some outdoor loading facilities, public works yards, hazardous materials generators (if containers are exposed to rainfall), vehicle service, washing, and maintenance areas, and steam cleaning facilities. Since porous pavement is an infiltration practice, it should not be applied at stormwater hot spots due to the potential for groundwater contamination. All contaminated runoff should be prevented from entering municipal storm drain systems by using best management practices (BMPs) for the specific industry or activity.

=== Weight and traffic volumes ===
Reference sources differ on whether low or medium traffic volumes and weights are appropriate for porous pavements due to the variety of physical properties of each system. For example, around truck loading docks and areas of high commercial traffic, porous pavement is sometimes cited as being inappropriate. However, given the variability of products available, the growing number of existing installations in North America and targeted research by both manufacturers and user agencies, the range of accepted applications seems to be expanding. Some concrete paver companies have developed products specifically for industrial applications. Working examples exist at fire halls, busy retail complex parking lots, and on public and private roads, including intersections in parts of North America with quite severe winter conditions.

=== Siting ===
Permeable pavements may not be appropriate when land surrounding or draining into the pavement exceeds a 20 percent slope, where pavement is down slope from buildings or where foundations have piped drainage at their footers. The key is to ensure that drainage from other parts of a site is intercepted and dealt with separately rather than being directed onto permeable surfaces.

=== Climate ===
Cold climates may present special challenges. Road salt contains chlorides that could migrate through the porous pavement into groundwater. Snow plow blades could catch block edges of concrete pavers or other block installations, damaging surfaces and creating potholes. Sand cannot be used for snow and ice control on porous surfaces because it will plug the pores and reduce permeability. Although there are design modifications to reduce the risks, infiltrating runoff may freeze below the pavement, causing frost heave. Another issue is spalling damage, which exclusively occurs on porous concrete pavement from salt application during the winter season. Thus porous paving is suggested for warmer climates. However, other materials have proven to be effective, even lowering winter maintenance costs by preserving salt in the pavement itself. This also reduces the amount of storm water runoff that is contaminated with salt chlorides. Pervious concrete and asphalt designed to reduce frost heave and spalling damage has been used successfully in Norway and New Hampshire. Furthermore, experience suggests that preventive measures with rapid drainage below porous surfaces be taken in order to increase the rate of snow melt above ground.

=== Cost ===
It can be difficult to compare cost impacts between conventional impervious surfaces and permeable surfaces given the variables such as lifespan, geographic location, type of permeable paving system and site specific factors. Some estimates put the cost of permeable paving at about one third more expensive than that of conventional impervious paving. Using permeable paving, however, can reduce the cost of providing larger or more stormwater BMPs on site, and these savings should be factored into any cost analysis. In addition, the off-site environmental impact costs of not reducing on-site stormwater volumes and pollution have historically been ignored or assigned to other groups (local government parks, public works and environmental restoration budgets, fisheries losses, etc.). Permeable paving systems, specifically pervious concrete pavers, have shown significant cost benefits after a Life Cycle Assessment was performed, as the reduction in total weight of material needed for each unit is reduced by nature of the porous design.

=== Longevity and maintenance ===
Permeable paving systems, especially those with porous surfaces, require maintenance in order to keep the pores clear of fine aggregates as to not hinder the systems ability to infiltrate stormwater. The frequency of cleaning is again dependent on many site specific factors, such as runoff volume, neighboring sites and climate. Often, cleaning of permeable paving systems is done by suction excavators, which are alternatively used for excavation in sensitive areas and therefore are becoming increasingly common. If maintenance is not carried out on a regular basis, the porous pavements can begin to function more like impervious surfaces. With more advanced paving systems the levels of maintenance needed can be greatly decreased, elastomerically bound glass pavements requires less maintenance than regular concrete paving as the glass bound pavement has 50% more void space.

Plastic grid systems, if selected and installed correctly, are becoming more and more popular with local government maintenance personnel owing to the reduction in maintenance efforts: reduced gravel migration and weed suppression in public park settings.

Some permeable paving products are prone to damage from misuse, such as drivers who tear up patches of plastic & gravel grid systems by "joy riding" on remote parking lots at night. The damage is not difficult to repair but can look unsightly in the meantime. Grass pavers require supplemental watering in the first year to establish the vegetation, otherwise they may need to be re-seeded. Regional climate also means that most grass applications will go dormant during the dry season. While brown vegetation is only a matter of aesthetics, it can influence public support for this type of permeable paving.

Traditional permeable concrete paving bricks tend to lose their color in relatively short time which can be costly to replace or clean and is mainly due to the problem of efflorescence.

== Types of permeable pavement ==
Installation of porous pavements is no more difficult than that of dense pavements, but has different specifications and procedures which must be strictly adhered to. Nine different families of porous paving materials present distinctive advantages and disadvantages for specific applications. Here are examples:

=== Pervious concrete ===
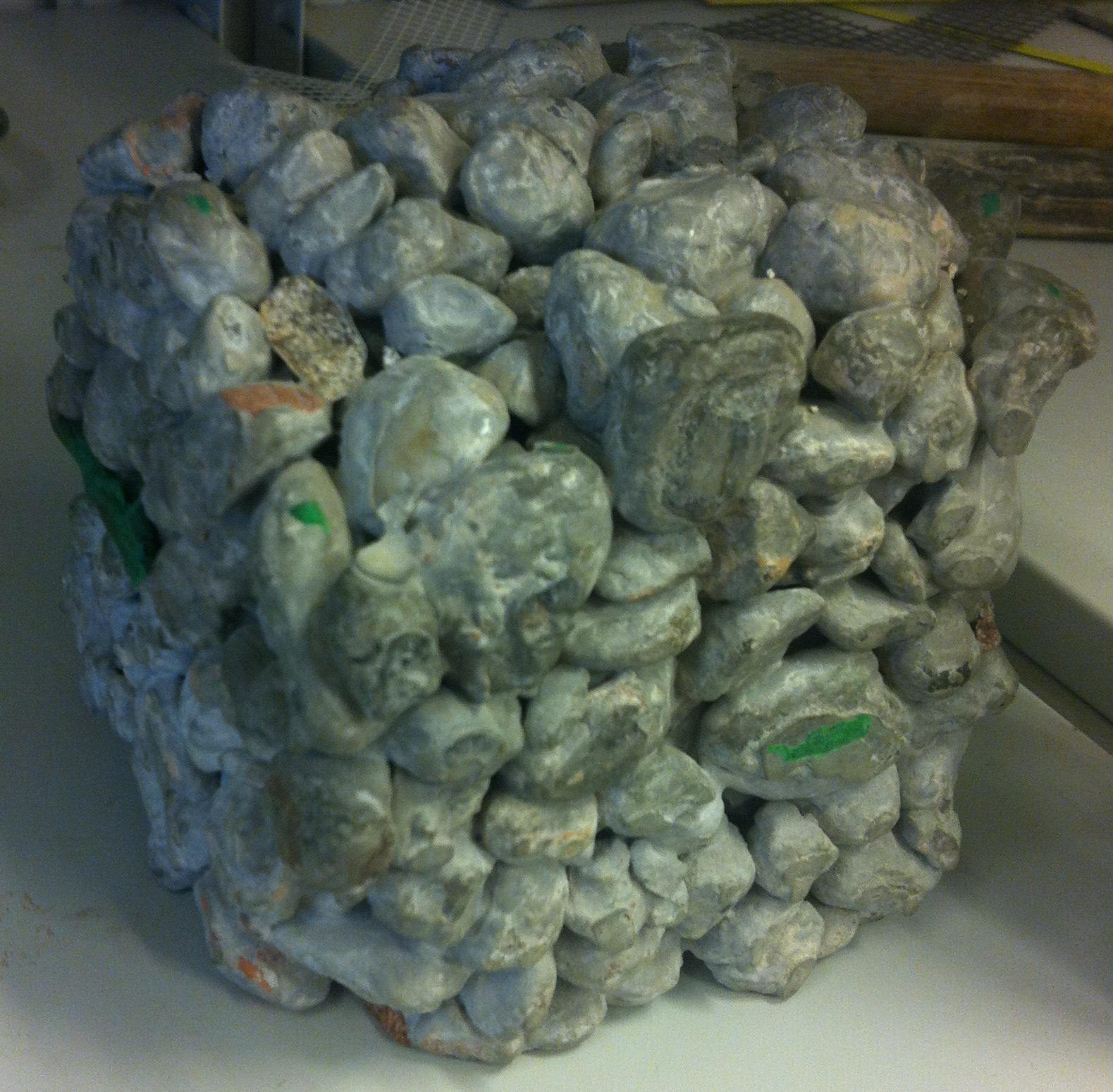
Pervious concrete

Pervious concrete is widely available, can bear frequent traffic, and is universally accessible. Pervious concrete quality depends on the installer's knowledge and experience.

=== Plastic grids ===
Plastic grids allow for a 100% porous system using structural grid systems for containing and stabilizing either gravel or turf. These grids come in a variety of shapes and sizes depending on use; from pathways to commercial parking lots. These systems have been used readily in Europe for over a decade, but are gaining popularity in North America due to requirements by government for many projects to meet LEED environmental building standards. Plastic grid systems are also popular with homeowners due to their lower cost to install, ease of installation, and versatility. The ideal design for this type of grid system is a closed cell system, which prevents gravel/sand/turf from migrating laterally.

=== Porous asphalt ===
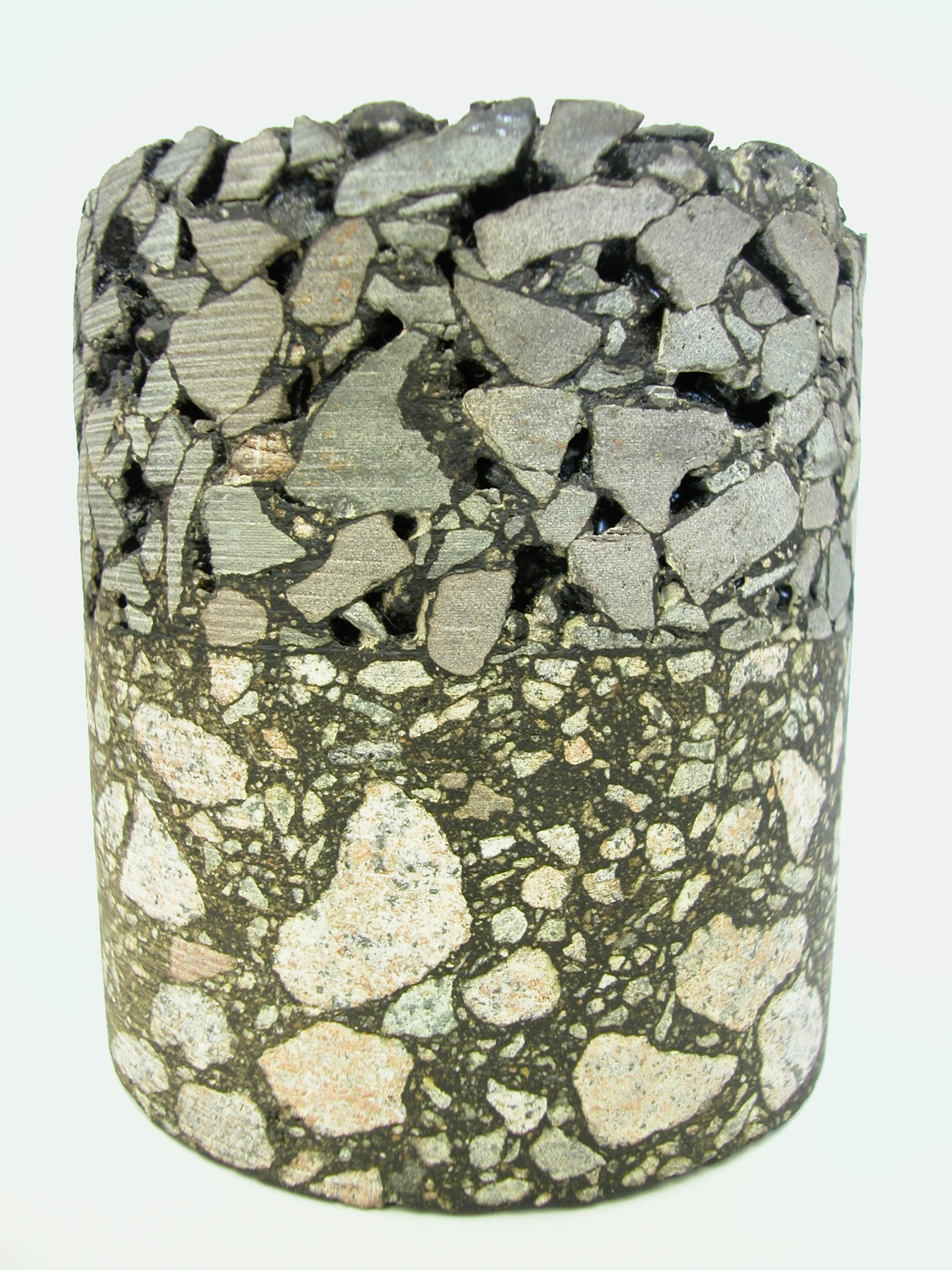
Core porous asphalt

Porous asphalt is produced and placed using the same methods as conventional asphalt concrete; it differs in that fine (small) aggregates are omitted from the asphalt mixture. The remaining large, single-sized aggregate particles leave open voids that give the material its porosity and permeability. To ensure pavement strength, fiber may be added to the mix or a polymer-modified asphalt binder may be used. Generally, porous asphalt pavements are designed with a subsurface reservoir that holds water that passes through the pavement, allowing it to evaporate and/or percolate slowly into the surround soils.

Open-graded friction courses (OGFC) are a porous asphalt surface course used on highways to improve driving safety by removing water from the surface. These use an open-graded mix design for the top layer of asphalt. Unlike a full-depth porous asphalt pavement, OGFCs do not drain water to the base of a pavement. Instead, they allow water to infiltrate the top 19 to 38 millimetres (3/4–1 1/2 in) of the pavement and then drain out to the side of the roadway. This can improve the friction characteristics of the road and reduce road spray.

In the Netherlands and Belgium, porous asphalt is colloquially referred to as "fluisterasfalt" (whisper asphalt) for its reduced noise level.

=== Single-sized aggregate ===
Single-sized aggregate without any binder, e.g. loose gravel, stone-chippings, is another alternative. Although it can only be safely used in walkways and very low-speed, low-traffic settings, e.g. car-parks and drives, its potential cumulative area is great.

=== Porous turf ===
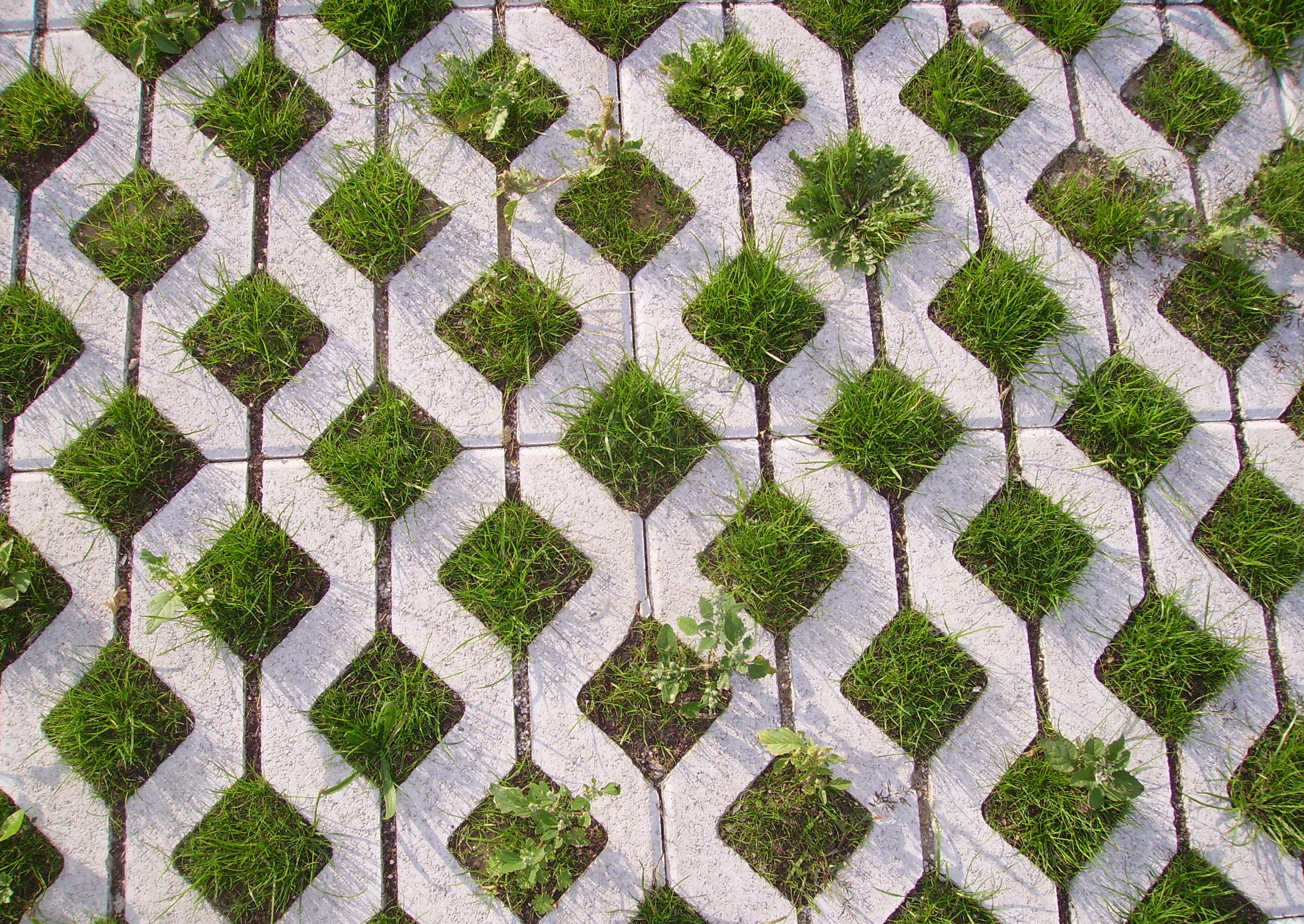
Grass pavement

Porous turf, if properly constructed, can be used for occasional parking like that at churches and stadia. Plastic turf reinforcing grids can be used to support the increased load. Living turf transpires water, actively counteracting the "heat island" with what appears to be a green open lawn.

=== Permeable interlocking concrete pavements ===
Permeable interlocking concrete pavements are concrete units with open, permeable spaces between the units. More recently manufacturers in America have introduced styles with smaller joint allowing for better ADA compliance and still capturing a significant amount of stormwater. They give an architectural appearance, and can bear both light and heavy traffic, particularly interlocking concrete pavers, excepting high-volume or high-speed roads. Some products are polymer-coated and have an entirely porous face.

=== Permeable clay brick pavements ===
Permeable clay brick pavements are fired clay brick units with open, permeable spaces between the units. Clay pavers provide a durable surface that allows stormwater runoff to permeate through the joints.

=== Resin-bound paving ===
Resin bound paving is a mixture of resin binder and aggregate. Clear resin is used to fully coat each aggregate particle before laying. Enough resin is used to allow each aggregate particle to adhere to one another and to the base yet leave voids for water to permeate through. Resin bound paving provides a strong and durable surface that is suitable for pedestrian and vehicular traffic in applications such as pathways, driveways, car parks and access roads.

=== Stabilized decomposed granite ===
Stabilized decomposed granite is a mixture of a non-resin binder and aggregate (decomposed granite). The binder, which may include color, is mixed with the decomposed granite and the mixture is moistened either before it is put in place or after. Stabilized decomposed granite provides a strong and durable surface that is suitable for pedestrian and vehicular traffic in applications such as pathways, driveways, car parks and access roads. The surface is ADA compliant and can be painted on..

=== Bound recycled glass porous pavement ===
Elastomerically bound recycled glass porous pavement consisting of bonding processed post-consumer glass with a mixture of resins, pigments, granite and binding agents. Approximately 75 percent of glass in the U.S. is disposed in landfills.

=== Wood permeable pavement ===
Wood permeable pavement is a natural and sustainable building material. Architects and landscape designers turning towards permeable pavers will find that some types of highly durable hardwoods (e.g. black locust) are an effective permeable pavers material. Wood paver blocks made of black locust provide a highly permeable, durable surface that will last for decades because of the characteristics of the wood. Black locust lumber wood pavers exceed 70.19 kilopascals (10.180 psi) and have a Janka hardness of 7.6 kilonewtons (1,700 lbf). They are suitable for pedestrian and vehicular traffic in the form of pathways and driveways and are placed upon permeable foundations.

== See also ==
Stormwater management practices related to roadways:

- Bioretention
- Bioswale
- Hoggin

=== Other related pages ===
- Pavement engineering
- Blue roof
