= Low-impact development (U.S. and Canada) =

Conservation-oriented land use planning

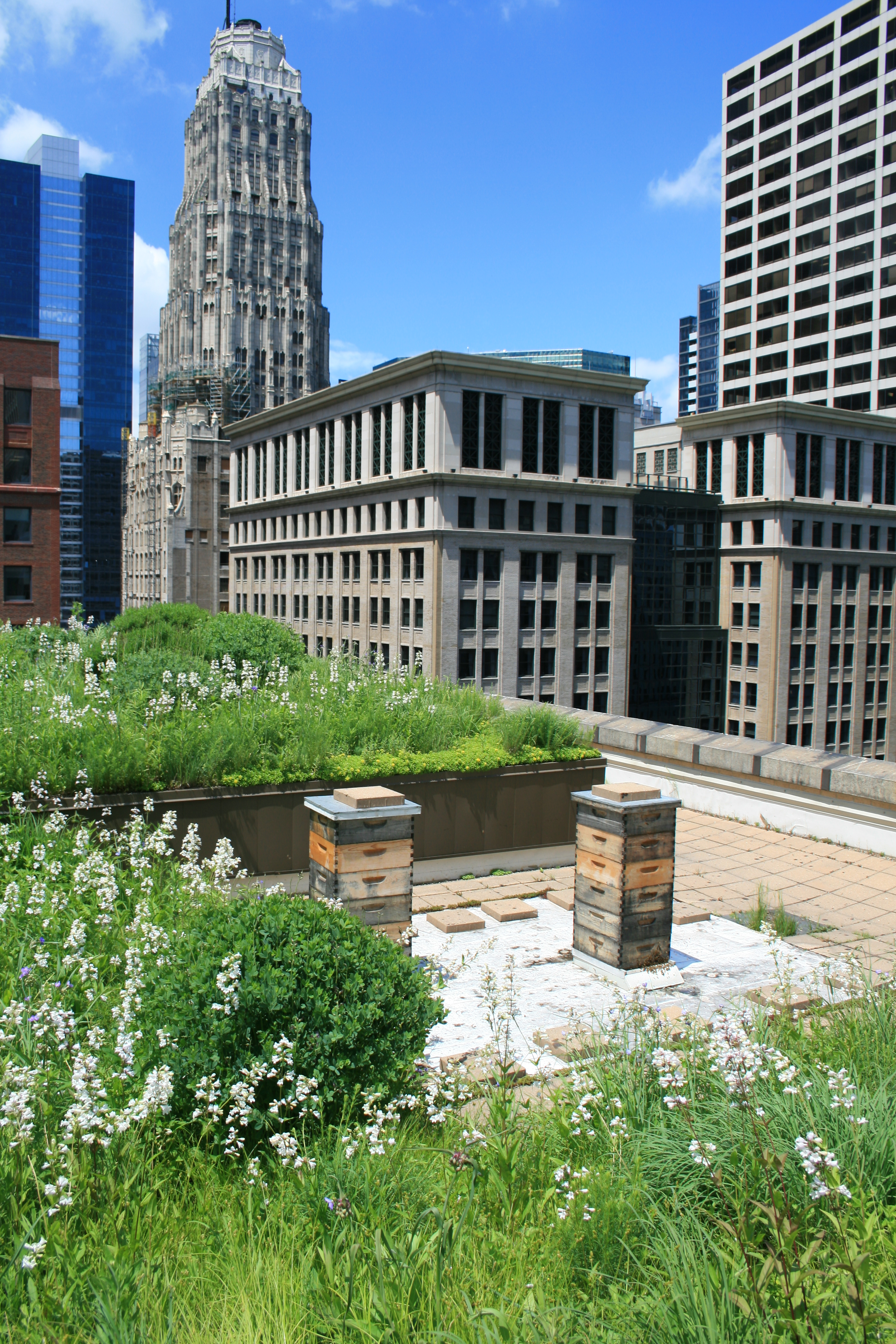
A green roof installed at Chicago City Hall

Low-impact development (LID) is a term used in Canada and the United States to describe a land planning and engineering design approach to manage stormwater runoff as part of green infrastructure. LID emphasizes conservation and use of on-site natural features to protect water quality. This approach implements engineered small-scale hydrologic controls to replicate the pre-development hydrologic regime of watersheds through infiltrating, filtering, storing, evaporating, and detaining runoff close to its source. Green infrastructure investments are one approach that often yields multiple benefits and builds city resilience.

Broadly equivalent terms used elsewhere include Sustainable drainage systems (SuDS) in the United Kingdom (where LID has a different meaning), water-sensitive urban design (WSUD) in Australia, natural drainage systems in Seattle, Washington, "Environmental Site Design" as used by the Maryland Department of the Environment, and "Onsite Stormwater Management", as used by the Washington State Department of Ecology.

== Alternative to conventional stormwater management practices ==
A concept that began in Prince George's County, Maryland in 1990, LID began as an alternative to traditional stormwater best management practices (BMPs) installed at construction projects. Officials found that the traditional practices such as detention ponds and retention basins were not cost-effective and the results did not meet water quality goals. The Low Impact Development Center, Inc., a non-profit water resources research organization, was formed in 1998 to work with government agencies and institutions to further the science, understanding, and implementation of LID and other sustainable environmental planning and design approaches, such as Green Infrastructure and the Green Highways Partnership.

The LID design approach has received support from the U.S. Environmental Protection Agency (EPA) and is being promoted as a method to help meet goals of the Clean Water Act. Various local, state, and federal agency programs have adopted LID requirements in land development codes and implemented them in public works projects. LID techniques can also play an important role in Smart Growth and Green infrastructure land use planning.

== Designing for low-impact development ==
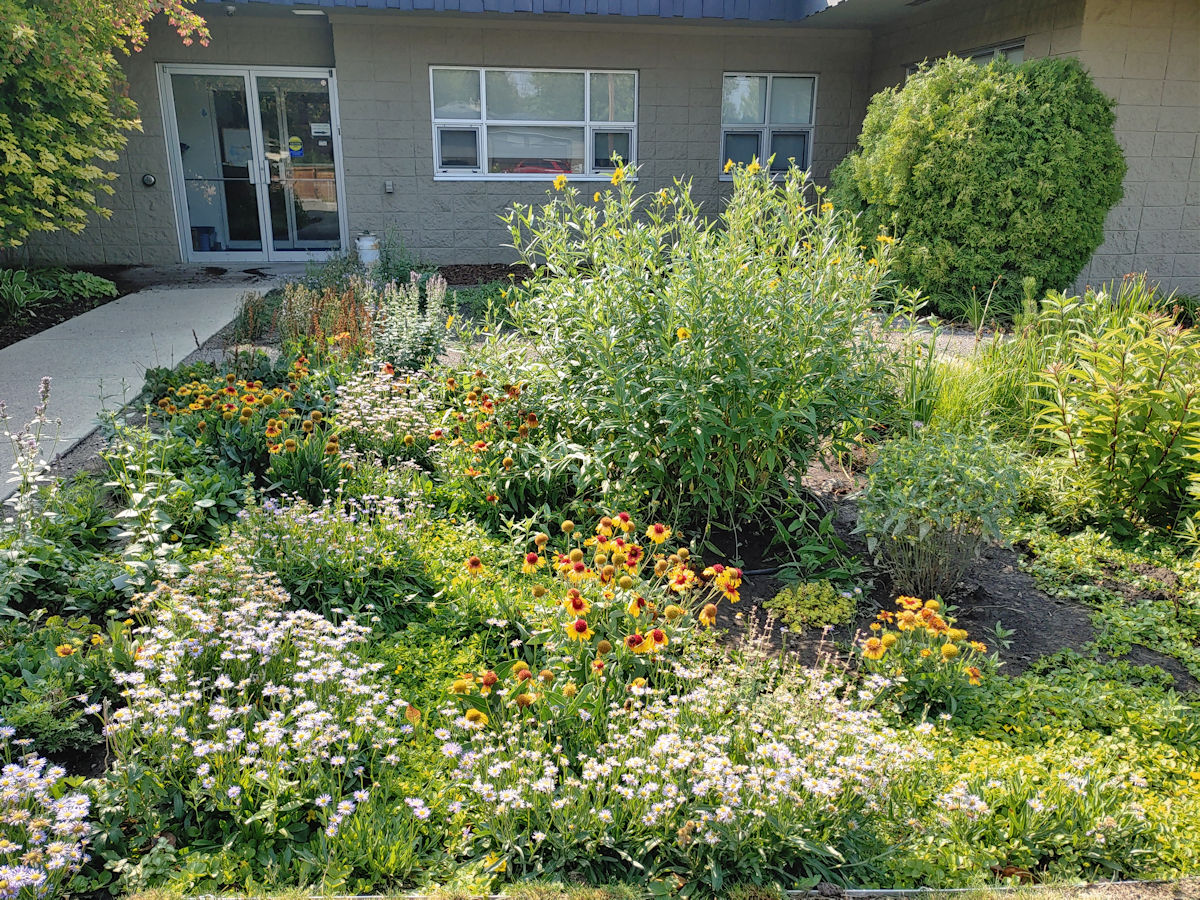
Rain garden in Calgary, Alberta harvesting rainwater from roof

The basic principle of LID to use nature as a model and manage rainfall at the source is accomplished through sequenced implementation of runoff prevention strategies, runoff mitigation strategies, and finally, treatment controls to remove pollutants. Although Integrated Management Practices (IMPs) — decentralized, microscale controls that infiltrate, store, evaporate, and detain runoff close to the source — get most of the attention by engineers, it is crucial to understand that LID is more than just implementing a new list of practices and products. It is a strategic design process to create a sustainable site that mimics the undeveloped hydrologic properties of the site. It requires a prescriptive approach that is appropriate for the proposed land use.

Design using LID principles follows four simple steps.

1. Determine pre-developed conditions and identify the hydrologic goal (some jurisdictions suggest going to wooded conditions).
2. Assess treatment goals, which depend on site use and local keystone pollutants.
3. Identify a process that addresses the specific needs of the site.
4. Implement a practice that utilizes the chosen process and that fits within the site's constraints.

The basic processes used to manage stormwater include pretreatment, filtration, infiltration, and storage and reuse.

=== Pre-treatment ===
Pre-treatment is recommended to remove pollutants such as trash, debris, and larger sediments. Incorporation of a pretreatment system, such as a hydrodynamic separator, can prolong the longevity of the entire system by preventing the primary treatment practice from becoming prematurely clogged.

=== Filtration ===
When stormwater is passed through a filter media, solids and other pollutants are removed. Most media remove solids by mechanical processes. The gradation of the media, irregularity of shape, porosity, and surface roughness characteristics all influence solids removal. Many other pollutants such as nutrients and metals can be removed through chemical and/or biological processes. Filtration is a key component to LID sites, especially when infiltration is not feasible. Filter systems can be designed to remove the primary pollutants of concern from runoff and can be configured in decentralized small-scale inlets. This allows for runoff to be treated close to its source without additional collection or conveyance infrastructure.

=== Infiltration ===
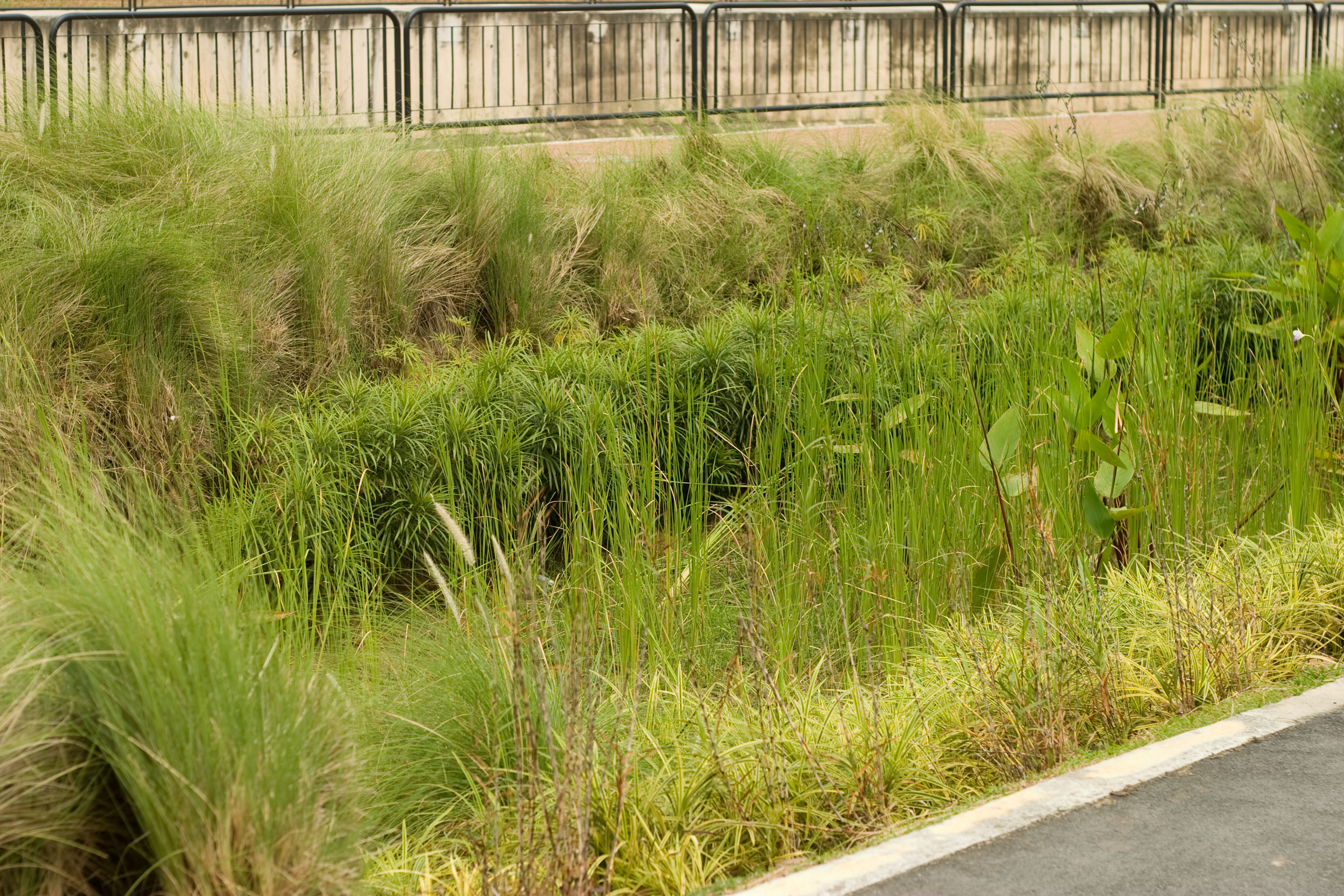
Balam Estate stormwater Rain garden, Singapore

Infiltration reclaims stormwater runoff and allows for groundwater recharge. Runoff enters the soil and percolates through to the subsurface. The rate of infiltration is affected by soil compaction and storage capacity, and will decrease as the soil becomes saturated. The soil texture and structure, vegetation types and cover, water content of the soil, soil temperature, and rainfall intensity all play a role in controlling infiltration rate and capacity. Infiltration plays a critical role in LID site design. Some of the benefits of infiltration include improved water quality (as water is filtered through the soil) and reduction in runoff. When distributed throughout a site, infiltration can significantly help maintain the site's natural hydrology.

=== Storage and reuse ===
Capturing and reusing stormwater as a resource helps maintain a site's predevelopment hydrology while creating an additional supply of water for irrigation or other purposes. Rainwater harvesting is an LID practice that facilitates the reuse of stormwater.

== Five principles of low-impact development ==
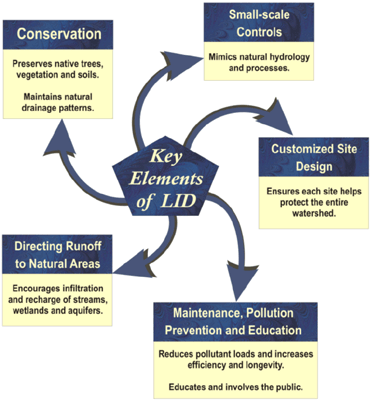

There are 5 core requirements when it comes to designing for LID.

1. Conserve natural areas wherever possible (don't pave over the whole site if you don't need to).
2. Minimize the development impact on hydrology.
3. Maintain runoff rate and duration from the site (don't let the water leave the site).
4. Scatter integrated management practices (IMPs) throughout your site – IMPs are decentralized, microscale controls that infiltrate, store, evaporate, and/or detain runoff close to the source.
5. Implement pollution prevention, proper maintenance and public education programs.

== Typical practices and controls ==
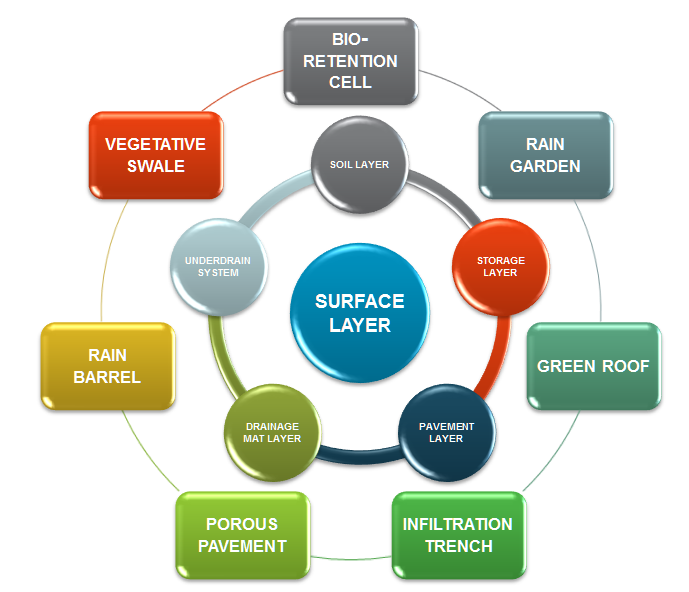
LID features

Planning practices include several related approaches that were developed independently by various practitioners. These differently named approaches include similar concepts and share similar goals in protecting water quality.

- Conservation design, also called conservation development
- Better site design
- Green infrastructure.

Planners select structural LID practices for an individual site in consideration of the site's land use, hydrology, soil type, climate and rainfall patterns. There are many variations on these LID practices, and some practices may not be suitable for a given site. Many are practical for retrofit or site renovation projects, as well as for new construction. Optimal places for retrofitting LID are single houses, school/university areas, and parks. Frequently used practices include:

- Bioretention cells, also known as rain gardens
- Cisterns and rain barrels
- Green roofs
- Pervious concrete, also called "porous pavement", similar to permeable paving
- Grassed swales, also known as bioswales.
- Commercially manufactured stormwater management devices that capture pollutants (e.g., media filters) and/or aid in on-site infiltration.
- Tree pits

== Limitations for LID progress ==
Urban areas are especially prone to create barriers for LID practices. The most common limits are:

- Lack of suitable places for LID facilities in existing complex infrastructure of urban areas
- Lack of design standards that can be applicable around the world
- Lack of knowledge about LID technology among local governments and residents
- Varied performance due to lack of understanding of climate difference
- False belief that LID practices are difficult to maintain and/or the maintenance cost is high.

== Benefits ==
LID has multiple benefits, such as protecting animal habitats, improving management of runoff and flooding, and reducing impervious surfaces. For example, Dr. Allen Davis from the University of Maryland, College Park conducted research on the runoff management from LID rain gardens. His data indicated that LID rain gardens can hold up to 90% of water after a major rain event and release this water over a time scale of up to two weeks. LID also improves groundwater quality and increases its quantity, which increases aesthetics, therefore raising community value.

LID can also be used to eliminate the need for stormwater ponds, which occupy expensive land. Incorporating LID into designs enables developers to build more homes on the same plot of land and maximize their profits.

In some municipalities, LID can be a cost-effective way to reduce the incidence of combined sewer overflows (CSO).

According to the co-benefits approach, LID is an opportunity to technically mitigate urban heat island (UHI) phenomenon with higher compatibilities in cool pavement and green infrastructures. Although there are some intrinsic discrepancies among understandings of LID and UHI mitigation towards blue infrastructure, the osmotic pool, wet pond, and regulating pond are essential supplements to urban water bodies, performing their roles in nourishing vegetation and evaporating for cooling in UHI mitigation. LID pilot projects have already provided the financial foundation for taking the UHI mitigation further. It is an attempt for people in different disciplines to synergistically think about how to mitigate UHI effects, which is conducive to the generation of holistic policies, guidelines and regulations. Furthermore, the inclusion of UHI mitigation can be a driver to public participation in SPC construction, which can consolidate the PPP model for more funds.

== See also ==
- Rainwater harvesting
- Sustainable development
- Sustainable urban drainage systems
- Water pollution

=== Synonyms ===
- Nature-based solutions (European Union)
- Water-sensitive urban design (Australia)
- Sponge city (China)
- ABC water (Singapore)
