= Pervious concrete =

High-porosity, water-permeable concrete

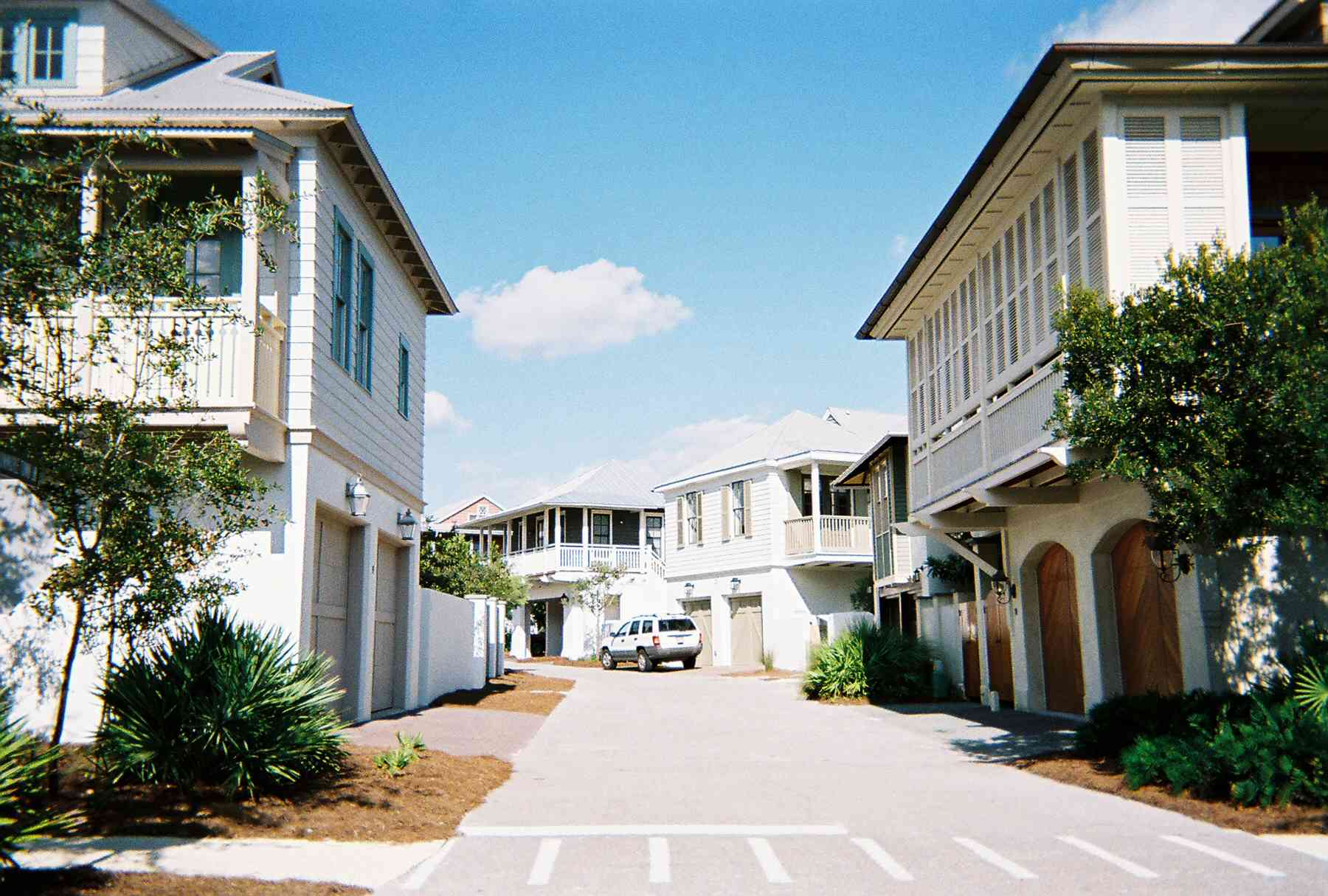
A pervious concrete street in 2005

Pervious concrete (also called porous concrete, permeable concrete, no fines concrete and porous pavement) is a special type of concrete with a high porosity used for concrete flatwork applications that allows water from precipitation and other sources to pass directly through, thereby reducing the runoff from a site and allowing groundwater recharge.

Pervious concrete is made using large aggregates with little to no fine aggregates. The concrete paste then coats the aggregates and allows water to pass through the concrete slab. Pervious concrete is traditionally used in parking areas, areas with light traffic, residential streets, pedestrian walkways, and greenhouses. It is an important application for sustainable construction and is one of many low impact development techniques used by builders to protect water quality.

== History ==
Pervious concrete was first used in the 1800s in Europe as pavement surfacing and load bearing walls. Cost efficiency was the main motive due to a decreased amount of cement. It became popular again in the 1920s for two storey houses in Scotland and England. It became increasingly viable in Europe after WWII due to the scarcity of cement. It did not become as popular in the US until the 1970s. In India it became popular in 2000.

== Stormwater management ==
The proper utilization of pervious concrete is a recognized Best Management Practice by the U.S. Environmental Protection Agency (EPA) for providing first flush pollution control and stormwater management. As regulations further limit stormwater runoff, it is becoming more expensive for property owners to develop real estate, due to the size and expense of the necessary drainage systems. Pervious concrete lowers the NRCS Runoff Curve Number or CN by retaining stormwater on site. This allows the planner/designer to achieve pre-development stormwater goals for pavement intense projects. Pervious concrete reduces the runoff from paved areas, which reduces the need for separate stormwater retention ponds and allows the use of smaller capacity storm sewers. This allows property owners to develop a larger area of available property at a lower cost. Pervious concrete also naturally filters storm water and can reduce pollutant loads entering into streams, ponds, and rivers.

Pervious concrete functions like a storm water infiltration basin and allows the storm water to infiltrate the soil over a large area, thus facilitating recharge of precious groundwater supplies locally. All of these benefits lead to more effective land use. Pervious concrete can also reduce the impact of development on trees. A pervious concrete pavement allows the transfer of both water and air to root systems to help trees flourish even in highly developed areas.

== Properties ==
Pervious concrete consists of cement, coarse aggregate (size should be 9.5 mm to 12.5 mm) and water with little to no fine aggregates. The addition of a small amount of sand will increase the strength. The mixture has a water-to-cement ratio of 0.28 to 0.40 with a void content of 15 to 25 percent.

The correct quantity of water in the concrete is critical. A low water to cement ratio will increase the strength of the concrete, but too little water may cause surface failure. A proper water content gives the mixture a wet-metallic appearance. As this concrete is sensitive to water content, the mixture should be field checked. Entrained air may be measured by a Rapid Air system, where the concrete is stained black and sections are analyzed under a microscope.

A common flatwork form has riser strips on top such that the screed is 3/8-1/2 inches (9 to 12 mm) above final pavement elevation. Mechanical screeds are preferable to manual. The riser strips are removed to guide compaction. Immediately after screeding, the concrete is compacted to improve the bond and smooth the surface. Excessive compaction of pervious concrete results in higher compressive strength, but lower porosity (and thus lower permeability).

Jointing varies little from other concrete slabs. Joints are tooled with a rolling jointing tool prior to curing or saw cut after curing. Curing consists of covering concrete with 6 mil plastic sheeting within 20 minutes of concrete discharge. However, this contributes to a substantial amount of waste sent to landfills. Alternatively, preconditioned absorptive lightweight aggregate as well as internal curing admixture (ICA) have been used to effectively cure pervious concrete without waste generation.

== Testing and inspection ==
Pervious concrete has a common strength of 600–1,500 pounds per square inch (4.1–10.3 MPa) though strengths up to 4,000 psi (28 MPa) can be reached. There is no standardized test for compressive strength. Acceptance is based on the unit weight of a sample of poured concrete using ASTM standard no. C1688. An acceptable tolerance for the density is plus or minus 5 pounds (2.3 kg) of the design density. Slump and air content tests are not applicable to pervious concrete because of the unique composition. The designer of a storm water management plan should ensure that the pervious concrete is functioning properly through visual observation of its drainage characteristics prior to opening of the facility.

== Cold climates ==
Concerns over the resistance to the freeze-thaw cycle have limited the use of pervious concrete in cold weather environments. The rate of freezing in most applications is dictated by the local climate. Entrained air may help protect the paste as it does in regular concrete. The addition of a small amount of fine aggregate to the mixture increases the durability of the pervious concrete. Avoiding saturation during the freeze cycle is the key to the longevity of the concrete. Related, having a well prepared 8 to 24 inch (200 to 600 mm) sub-base and a good drainage preventing water stagnation will reduce the possibility of freeze-thaw damage.

Using permeable concrete for pavements can make them safer for pedestrians in the winter because water won't settle on the surface and freeze leading to dangerously icy conditions. Roads can also be made safer for cars by the use of permeable concrete as the reduction in the formation of standing water will reduce the possibility of aquaplaning, and porous roads will also reduce tire noise.

== Maintenance ==
To prevent reduction in permeability, pervious concrete needs to be cleaned regularly. Cleaning can be accomplished through wetting the surface of the concrete and vacuum sweeping.

== See also ==
- Green infrastructure – Sustainable and resilient infrastructure
- Permeable paving – Roads built with water-pervious materials
- Urban runoff – Surface runoff of water caused by urbanization
- Impervious surface – Artificial structures such as pavements covered with water-tight materials
- Types of concrete – Building material consisting of aggregates cemented by a binder
