= Hydrodynamic separator =

Stormwater management device which filters out pollutants

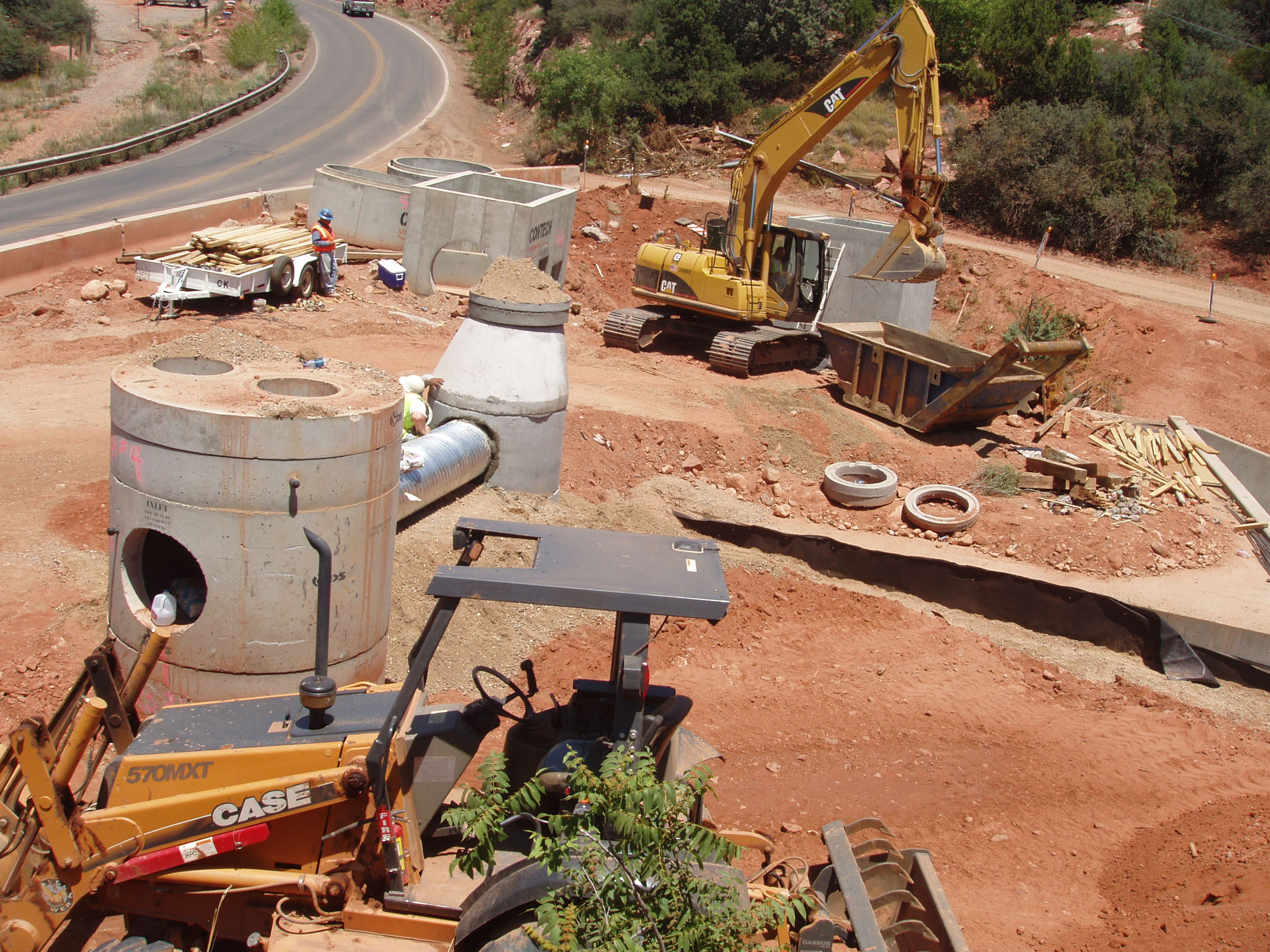
Installation of a hydrodynamic separator along an Arizona highway

In civil engineering (specifically hydraulic engineering), a hydrodynamic separator (HDS), also called a swirl separator, is a stormwater management device that uses cyclonic separation to control water pollution. They are designed as flow-through structures with a settling or separation unit to remove sediment and other pollutants. HDS are considered structural best management practices (BMPs), and are used to treat and pre-treat stormwater runoff, and are particularly suitable for highly impervious sites, such as roads, highways and parking lots.

== Design and applications ==
HDS systems use the physics of flowing water to remove a variety of pollutants and are characterized by an internal structure that either creates a swirling vortex or plunges the water into the main sump. Along with supplemental features to reduce velocity, an HDS system is designed to separate floatables (trash, debris and oil) and settleable particles, like sediment, from stormwater. HDS systems are not effective for the removal of very fine solids or dissolved pollutants. The systems are also subject to scour and sediment washout during large storm events, e.g. a 10-year storm.

== Evaluation ==
A number of factors are relevant in selecting a hydrodynamic separator product for a site.

=== Sizing, treatment performance and evaluation ===
HDS systems should be sized based on treatment objectives including desired level of pollutant removal, drainage basin characteristics, climate of the region, and particle size to be targeted. Performance is also sensitive to water temperature, i.e. season. Care must be taken to avoid routing excess flow through the device and compromising performance. Each vendor’s product has different pollutant removal rates that should be evaluated before selecting the system.

The Technology Assessment Protocol-Ecology (TAPE) and Technology Acceptance and Reciprocity Partnership (TARP) are evaluation programs sponsored by several state agencies in the U.S. These programs include lab and field testing and provide specific sizing criteria for hydrodynamic separation systems.

Currently, the Environmental & Water Resources Institute (a component of the American Society of Civil Engineers) and ASTM International are developing comprehensive verification guidelines and standard test methods for assessing the performance of these devices.

=== Maintenance and inspection requirements ===
HDS systems are not maintenance-intensive, when compared with land-based BMPs. Each manufactured system has a slightly different design, therefore maintenance and inspection requirements should be looked at closely when purchasing an HDS system. Vacuum trucks are typically used for maintenance, so unobstructed access to accumulated pollutants for removal is critical.

=== Installation and operating costs ===
Costs for HDS systems depend on site-specific conditions such as land characteristics, amount of runoff to be treated, system depth and performance requirements. Various brands of HDS systems differ in their treatment performance, and basing a decision solely on the installation and operating cost of a system may compromise system performance and the environment. Long-term maintenance costs should also be considered with overall costs when purchasing or selecting a stormwater BMP as initial installation and operating costs may not reflect the long-term investment needed to maintain the system.

=== Land cost considerations ===
According to the U.S. Environmental Protection Agency (EPA), "Catch basin inserts may be more suitable when available land is limited, such as in urbanized areas. Swirl separators tend to need more space than catch basin inserts but can still function when space is limited."

== Regulations ==
As stormwater regulations become increasingly stringent, many states and municipalities have developed criteria to govern the use and sizing of HDS systems, and publish lists that identify acceptable HDS systems. Other jurisdictions evaluate the applicability of HDS on a site-specific basis. It is increasingly common to use HDS as the first component of a treatment train, a combination of BMPs in series, to remove coarse solids and floatable pollutants that can rapidly clog other BMPs thus prolonging their maintenance cycle.

== See also ==
- Centrifuge
- Hydrocyclone
