= Best management practice for water pollution =

Type of water pollution control in the US and Canada

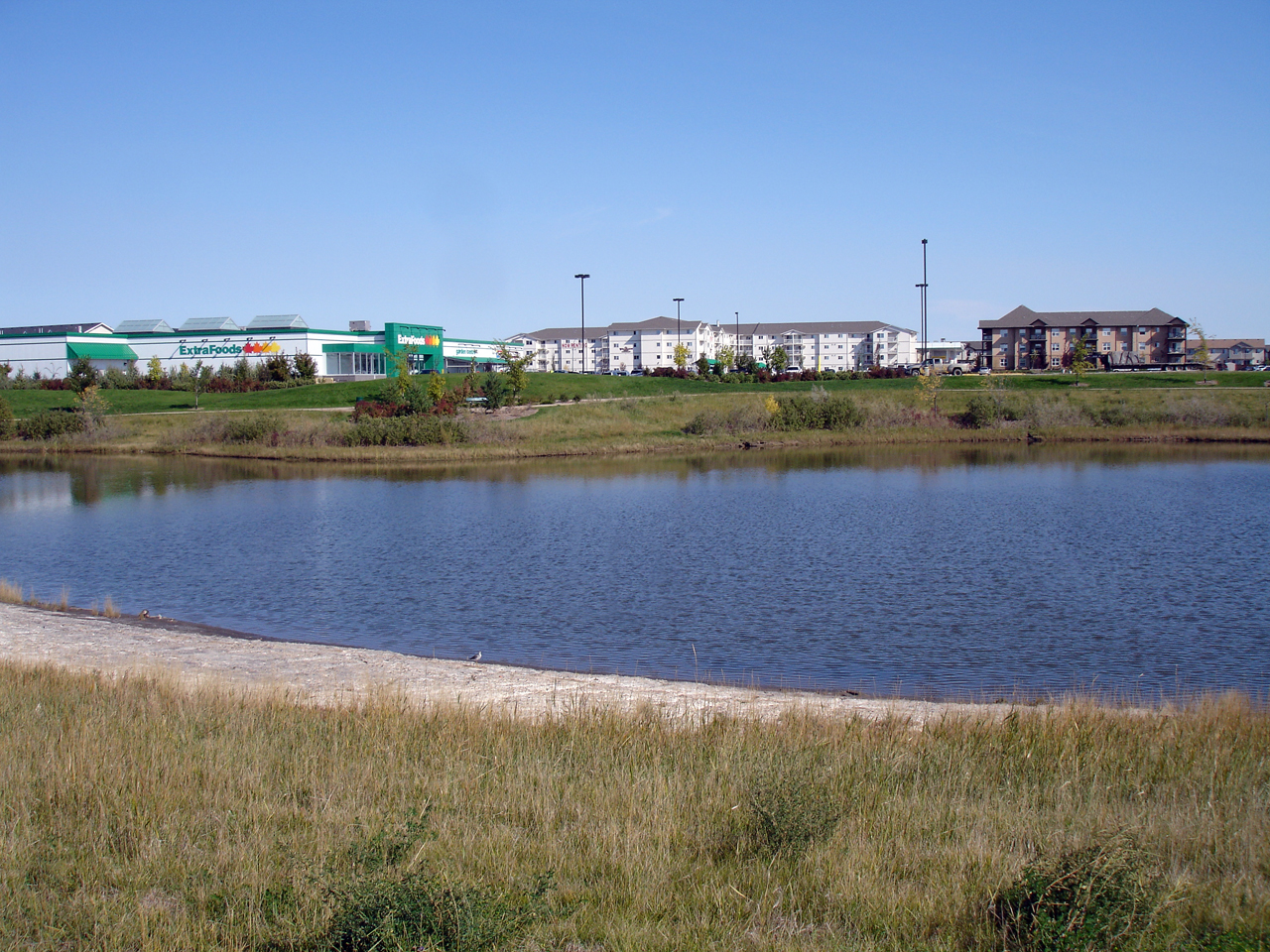
A retention pond for treatment of urban runoff (stormwater).

Best management practices (BMPs) is a term used in the United States and Canada to describe a type of water pollution control. Historically the term has referred to auxiliary pollution controls in the fields of industrial wastewater control and municipal sewage control, while in stormwater management (both urban and rural) and wetland management, BMPs may refer to a principal control or treatment technique as well.

== Terminology ==
Beginning in the 20th century, designers of industrial and municipal sewage pollution controls typically utilized engineered systems (e.g. filters, clarifiers, biological reactors) to provide the central components of pollution control systems, and used the term "BMPs" to describe the supporting functions for these systems, such as operator training and equipment maintenance.

Stormwater management, as a specialized area within the field of environmental engineering, emerged later in the 20th century, and some practitioners have used the term BMP to describe both structural or engineered control devices and systems (e.g. retention ponds) to treat polluted stormwater, as well as operational or procedural practices (e.g. minimizing use of chemical fertilizers and pesticides). Other practitioners prefer to use the term Stormwater control measure, due to the varied definitions of the term "BMP" and its use in non-stormwater practice.

== U.S. Clean Water Act References to "BMP" ==
Congress referred to BMP in several sections of the U.S. Clean Water Act (CWA) but did not define the term.

- The 1977 CWA used the term in describing the areawide waste treatment planning program and in procedures for controlling toxic pollutants associated with industrial discharges. The "Section 404" program, which covers dredge and fill permits, refers to BMPs in one of the enforcement exemptions.
- References to stormwater BMPs first appear in the 1987 amendment to the CWA in describing the Nonpoint Source Management Demonstration Program.
- Another stormwater BMP reference was added in 2001 with the authorization for a Wet Weather Watershed Pilot Project program.

== EPA definitions ==
In implementing the CWA, the U.S. Environmental Protection Agency (EPA) defined BMP in the federal wastewater permit regulations, initially to refer to auxiliary procedures for industrial wastewater controls.

...schedules of activities, prohibitions of practices, maintenance procedures, and other management practices to prevent or reduce the pollution of waters of the United States, BMPs also include treatment requirements, operating procedures, and practices to control plant site runoff, spillage or leaks, sludge or waste disposal, or drainage from raw material storage.

Later the Agency added a reference to stormwater management BMPs.

...each NPDES permit shall include conditions meeting the following requirements when applicable... (k) Best management practices (BMPs) to control or abate the discharge of pollutants when: ... (2) Authorized under section 402(p) of the CWA for the control of storm water discharges...

== Industrial wastewater BMPs ==
Industrial wastewater BMPs are considered an adjunct to engineered treatment systems. Typical BMPs include operator training, maintenance practices, and spill control procedures for treatment chemicals. There are also many BMPs available which are specific to particular industrial processes, for example:

- source reduction practices in metal finishing industries (e.g. substituting less toxic solvents or using water-based cleaners);
- in the chemical industry, capturing equipment washdown waters for recycle/reuse at various process stages;
- in the paper industry, using process control monitoring to optimize bleaching processes, and reduce the overall amount of bleach used.

== Stormwater management BMPs ==
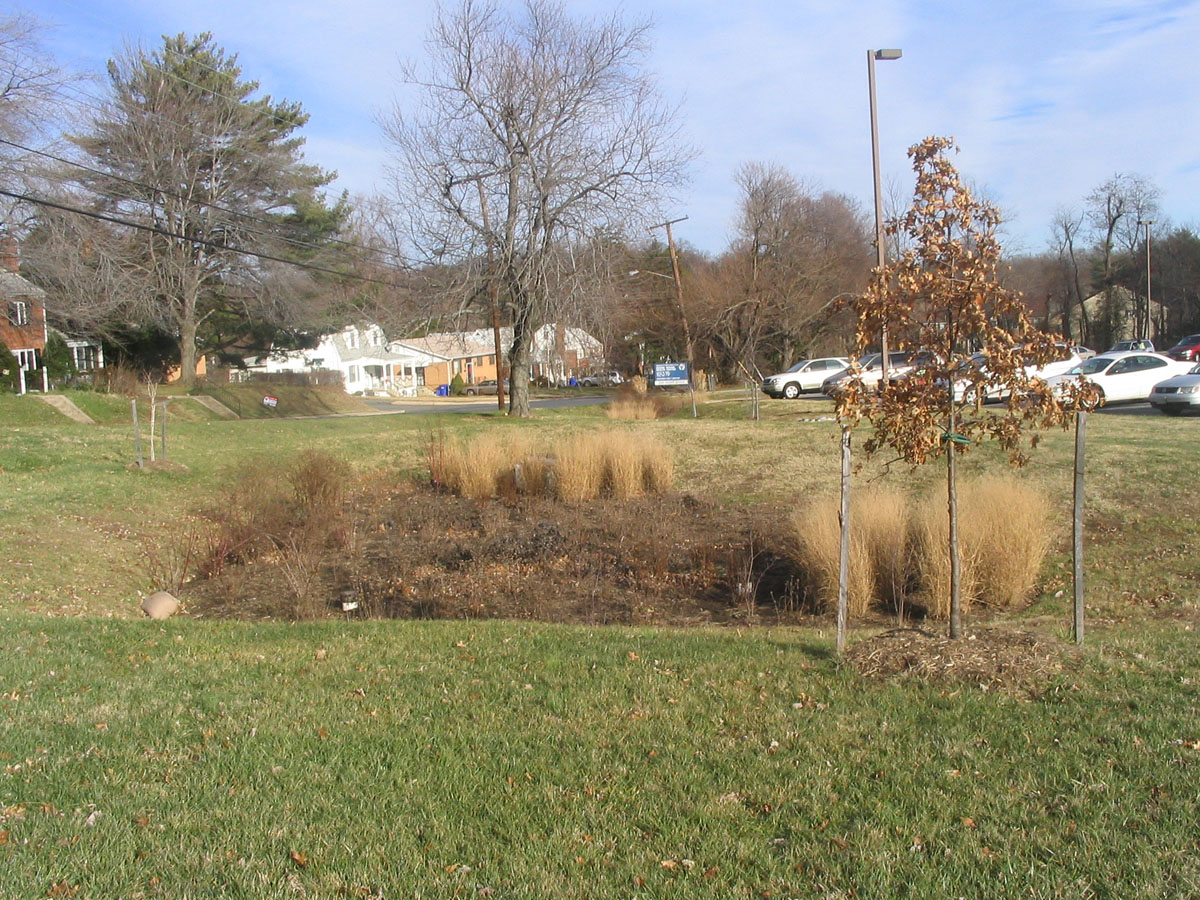
A rain garden for infiltration of urban runoff

Stormwater management BMPs are control measures taken to mitigate changes to both quantity and quality of urban runoff caused through changes to land use. Generally BMPs focus on water quality problems caused by increased impervious surfaces from land development. BMPs are designed to reduce stormwater volume, peak flows, and/or nonpoint source pollution through evapotranspiration, infiltration, detention, and filtration or biological and chemical actions. BMPs also can improve receiving-water quality by extending the duration of outflows in comparison to inflow duration (known as hydrograph extension), which dilutes the stormwater discharged into a larger volume of upstream flow. Although structural BMPs can be effective for reducing stormwater loads to receiving waters, studies indicate that they cannot improve in-stream water quality where receiving-water quality is poor.

Stormwater BMPs can be classified as "structural" (i.e., devices installed or constructed on a site such as silt fences, rock filter dams, fiber rolls (also called erosion control logs or excelsior wattles), sediment traps and numerous other proprietary products) or "non-structural" (procedures, such as modified landscaping practices, soil disturbing activity scheduling, or street sweeping). There are a variety of BMPs available; selection typically depends on site characteristics and pollutant removal objectives. EPA has published a series of stormwater BMP fact sheets for use by local governments, builders and property owners.

Stormwater management BMPs can be also categorized into four basic types:

1. Storage practices: ponds; recovery; green infrastructure design.
2. Vegetative practices: buffers; channels; green roofs; wetlands; functional art; stormwater wetland park design; wetland park engineering & design.
3. Filtration/Infiltration practices: filtering; infiltration; rain gardens; porous pavement; civic infrastructure and design; functional stormwater design.
4. Water sensitive development: better site design (revisions of local land development rules); open space site design; low impact development.

== See also ==
- Industrial wastewater treatment
- Low Impact Development (LID)
- Nationwide Urban Runoff Program (NURP) - EPA research program on stormwater BMPs
- Stochastic Empirical Loading and Dilution Model for modeling the performance of BMPs
- Sustainable urban drainage systems
- Blue-Green cities - Incorporating many of the same concepts into a holistic approach for city design.
