= Nationwide Urban Runoff Program =

US pollution research program

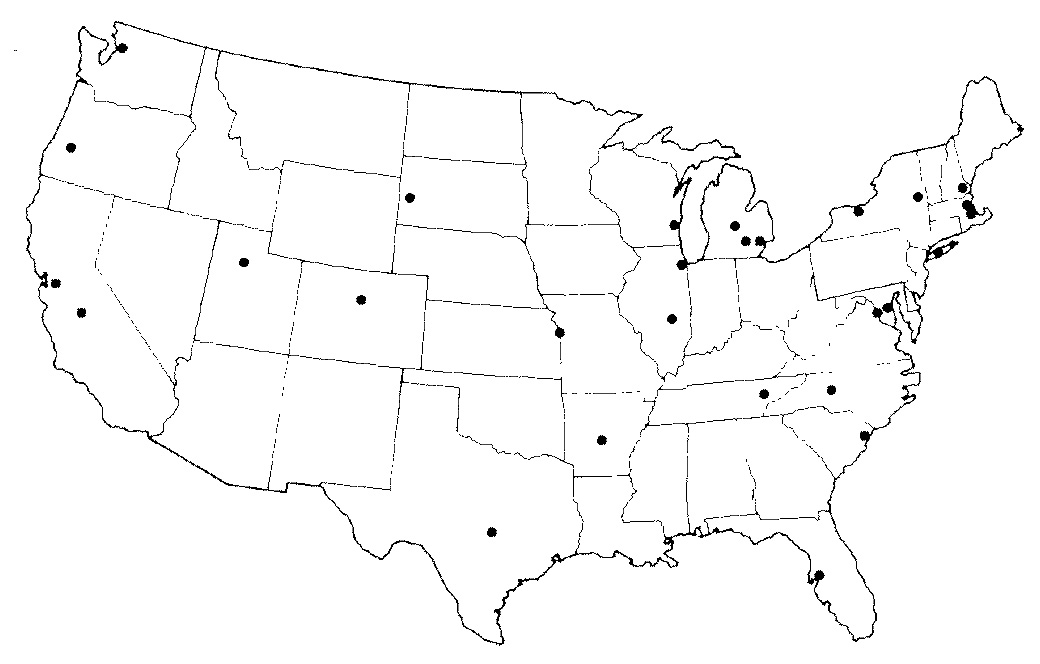
Map showing locations of 28 NURP projects

The Nationwide Urban Runoff Program (NURP) was a research project conducted by the United States Environmental Protection Agency (EPA) between 1979 and 1983. It was the first comprehensive study of urban stormwater pollution across the United States.

== Study objectives ==
The principal focus areas of the study consisted of:

- Examine the water quality aspects of urban runoff, and a comparison of results across various urban sites
- Assess the impact of urban runoff on overall water quality
- Implement stormwater management best practices.

A major component of the project was an analysis of water samples collected during 2,300 storms in 28 major metropolitan areas.

== Findings ==
Among the conclusions of the report are the following:

- "Heavy metals (especially copper, lead and zinc) are by far the most prevalent priority pollutant constituents found in urban runoff...Copper is suggested to be the most significant [threat] of the three."
- "Coliform bacteria are present at high levels in urban runoff."
- "Nutrients are generally present in urban runoff, but... [generally] concentrations do not appear to be high in comparison with other possible discharges."
- "Oxygen demanding substances are present in urban runoff at concentrations approximating those in secondary treatment plant discharges."
- "The physical aspects of urban runoff, e.g. erosion and scour, can be a significant cause of habitat disruption and can affect the type of fishery present."
- "Detention basins... [and] recharge devices are capable of providing very effective removal of pollutants in urban runoff."
- "Wet basins (designs which maintain a permanent water pool) have the greatest performance capabilities."
- "Wetlands are considered to be a promising technique for control of urban runoff quality."

An interesting finding of the NURP was that street sweeping was considered to be, "ineffective as a technique for improving the quality of urban runoff".

=== Impact of the report ===
In 1987, the results of the report were used as the basis of an amendment to the Clean Water Act requiring local governments and industry to address the pollution sources indicated by the report. The amendment requires all industrial stormwater dischargers (including many construction sites) and municipal storm sewer systems, affecting virtually all cities and towns in the country, to obtain discharge permits. EPA published national stormwater regulations in 1990 and 1999. EPA and state agencies began issuing stormwater permits in 1991. See Stormwater management permits.

== About "NURP ponds" ==
The term "NURP ponds" refers to retention basins (also called "wet ponds") that capture sediment from stormwater runoff as it is detained, and that are designed to perform to the level of the more effective ponds observed in the NURP studies. Some practitioners may assume that a "NURP pond" design conforms to some particular standard issued by EPA, but in fact EPA has issued no regulations or other requirements regarding the design of stormwater ponds. (However, some states and municipalities have issued stormwater design manuals, and these publications may include a reference to a "NURP pond".)

== See also ==
- Green infrastructure
- Stormwater management
- Water pollution in the United States
