= Blue roof =

Roof of a building that is designed to provide temporary water storage

A blue roof is a roof of a building that is designed explicitly to provide initial temporary water storage and then gradual release of stored water, typically rainfall. Blue roofs are constructed on flat or low sloped roofs in urban communities where flooding is a risk due to a lack of permeable surfaces for water to infiltrate, or seep back into the ground.

Water is stored in blue roof systems until it either evaporates or is released downstream after the storm event has passed. Blue roofs that are used for temporary rooftop storage can be classified as "active" or "passive" depending on the types of control devices used to regulate drainage of water from the roof. Blue roofs can provide a number of benefits depending on design. These benefits include temporary storage of rainfall to mitigate runoff impacts, storage for reuse such as irrigation or cooling water makeup, or recreational opportunities.

== Stormwater management and other benefits ==
=== Flood mitigation ===
Due to the density of urban development, there is a general lack of permeable surfaces in cities. This lack of area for stormwater to infiltrate back into the ground leaves cities vulnerable to flooding.

A number of blue roof pilot projects have been implemented around the United States, the results from which highlight their efficacy in reducing stormwater runoff during and after severe weather events.

=== Pollution reduction ===
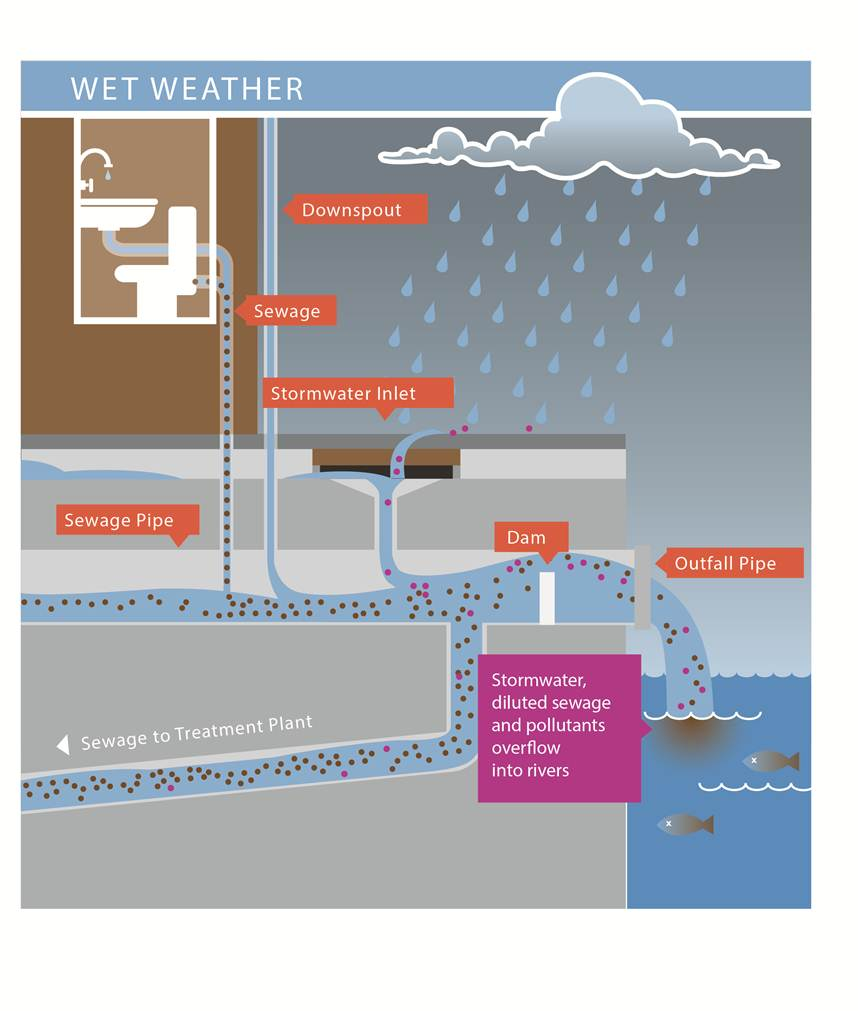
Pollution caused by combined sewer system overflows

While blue roofs do not remove pollutants from water by temporarily detaining it, they do reduce the load severe rain events place on storm sewers which stops emergency overflow from combined sewer systems from discharging untreated wastewater into rivers, streams, and coastal waters.

A significant blue roof pilot project intended to evaluate the potential of the systems for mitigating combined sewer overflow impacts was conducted between 2010 and 2012 by the New York City Department of Environmental Protection. The NYCDEP blue-roof projects are the first to utilize a novel passive blue roof tray design which relies on the lateral transitivity of non-woven filter fabric for drawdown control in a full scale pilot. Monitoring of these systems has demonstrated their performance as an effective means for mitigation of peak flows and alteration of timing in combined sewer systems.

=== Water scarcity ===
On the opposite side of the spectrum, cities with limited rainfall are vulnerable to drought and extended periods of restricted water usage. In drier climates, blue roofs act as a water conservation tool harvesting the water that falls on a roof's surface and collecting it at a controlled rate.

=== Design compatibility ===
Another major benefit of blue roofs are their ability to work alongside other rooftop systems such as solar panels (both solar thermal and PV), and HVAC mechanical equipment.

Some recreational blue roofs integrate rooftop waterplay areas that can also be used to irrigate a green roof, or to cool the roof of a building on hot days, in order to eliminate or at least reduce the HVAC load placed on mechanical refrigeration equipment.

Some blue roofs utilize stored water for beneficial on-site purposes cooling of solar panels and irrigation of a green roof. One example of a blue roof that provide ancillary services was the winning entry (First Place, 10,000 Euro prize) in the 2004 Coram Sustainable Design Award, by Steve Mann.

== Types ==
=== Active blue roof ===
Active blue roof systems control the rate at which water drains from a rooftop through mechanical means. Sometimes referred to as automated roof runoff management systems, active blue roofs use valve configurations and controls to monitor and regulate the discharge of stormwater runoff from roofs. Water ponded on the roof can be released in several ways, including via a pneumatically or hydraulically actuated pinch valve, an electronically controlled valve connected to a timer, or manually opening the valve. Active blue roofs for stormwater detention using forecast integration were first proposed in 2008.

=== Passive blue roof ===
Passive blue roof systems control the rate at which water drains from a rooftop through non-mechanical means. Unlike active systems which inhibit water flow through drainage pipes, passive systems temporarily detain water on the surface of the roof by lengthening the path the water must take in order to reach outlet drains. Blue roofs can include open water surfaces, storage within or beneath a porous media or modular surface, or below a raised decking surface or cover.

- Roof-integrated passive blue roof designs are built to retain water directly on a roof's surface, protected by a waterproof membrane, for extended periods of time. This ponding of water can be done either within a porous media, such as gravel, or free standing on the roof surface. The release rate of the stored water is controlled by weirs on the roof drain. Roof-integrated designs are most effective in new construction as achievable storage volume on existing flat roofs is often quite limited.
- Modular tray designs allow existing roofs to be retrofitted for stormwater retention capabilities with the addition of plastic or metal trays. Similarly to roof-integrated designs, water collected in the trays can either be ponded within a porous media or free standing within the tray. Modular tray blue roofs allow for more flexibility in the size and location of detention areas on a rooftop than a roof-integrated design. This selective placement of trays makes avoiding roof areas which cannot support the additional structural load, as well as any roof obstructions easier than other blue roof designs. Trays also have the added advantage of not using the roof material itself as a component of the detention structure and thus decrease instead of increase the hydraulic head on the underlying roofing membrane. As the water drains from the trays, it is released onto the roof surface itself and drains normally.
- Roof-dams or roof-checks physically interrupt the flow path of the water as it travels towards the roof drain. Similar to roof-integrated designs, the roof surface is the primary location of water detention with these impermeable or slow-releasing dams forcing water to pond behind them. The height of the dam and the size of weep holes can be used to control the detention time of the structures.
- Blue-green roof designs are aesthetically similar to green roofs in that they are vegetative roofs, but functionally different in that they have additional water storage capacity beneath the growing media to facilitate in stormwater retention.

=== Blue colored roof ===
A different type of "blue roof" has been proposed by researchers at the Lawrence Berkeley National Laboratory, who researched a pigment used by the ancient Egyptians known as "Egyptian blue". This color, derived from calcium copper silicate, absorbs visible light, and emits light in the near-infrared range, helping keep roofs and walls cool.

== See also ==
- Eco-village
- Energy-efficient landscaping
- Greywater
- Rainwater harvesting
- Rainwater tank
- Sod roof
- Sustainable city
