= Flood management =

Methods for reducing detrimental effects of flood waters

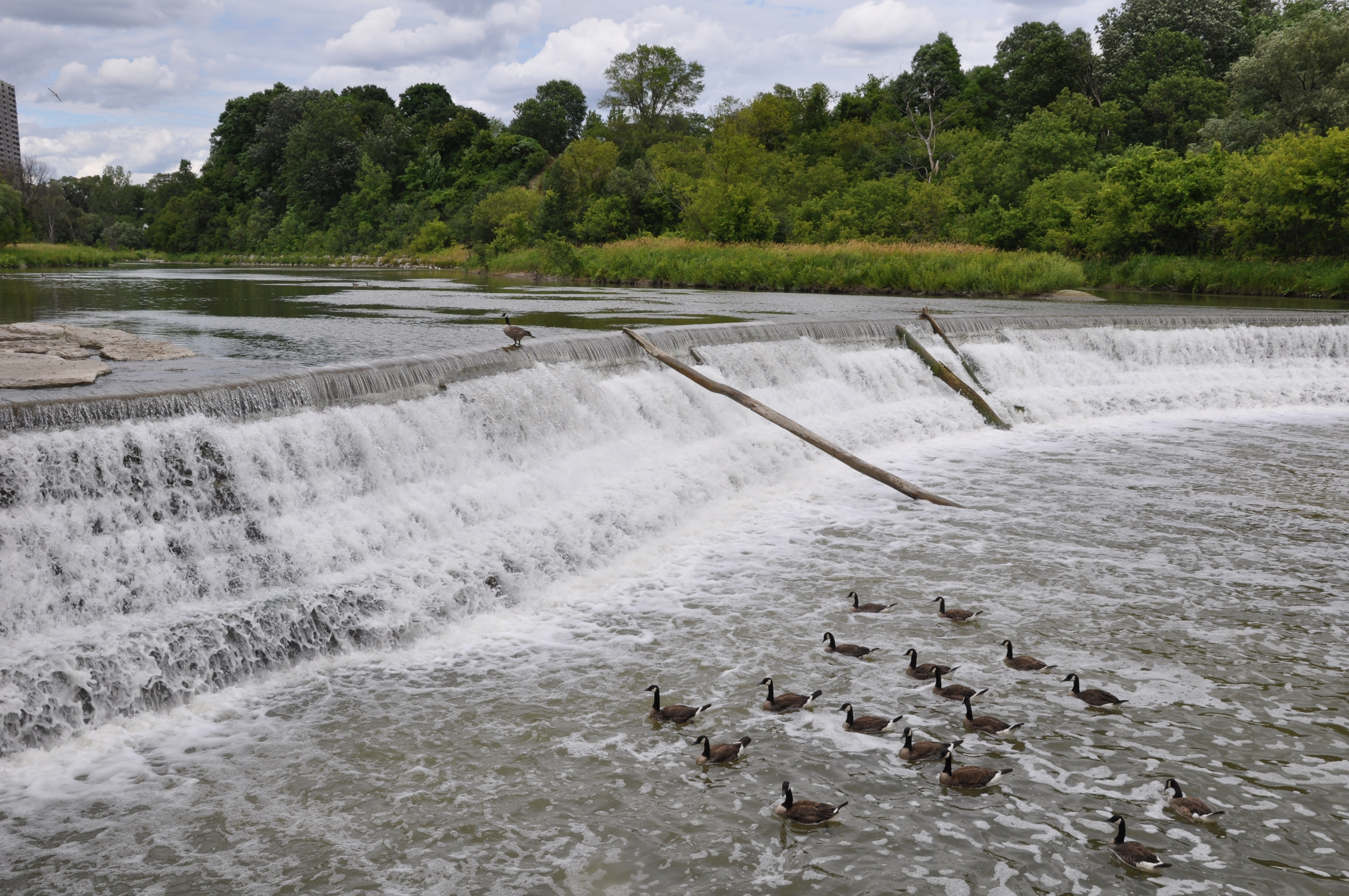
A weir was built on the Humber River (Ontario) to prevent a recurrence of a catastrophic flood.

Flood management or flood control are methods used to reduce or prevent the detrimental effects of flood waters. Flooding can be caused by a mix of both natural processes, such as extreme weather upstream, and human changes to waterbodies and runoff. Flood management methods can be either of the structural type (i.e. flood control) and of the non-structural type. Structural methods hold back floodwaters physically, while non-structural methods do not. Building hard infrastructure to prevent flooding, such as flood walls, is effective at managing flooding. However, it is best practice within landscape engineering to rely more on soft infrastructure and natural systems, such as marshes and flood plains, for handling the increase in water.

Flood management can include flood risk management, which focuses on measures to reduce risk, vulnerability and exposure to flood disasters and providing risk analysis through, for example, flood risk assessment. Flood mitigation is a related but separate concept describing a broader set of strategies taken to reduce flood risk and potential impact while improving resilience against flood events.

As climate change has led to increased flood risk an intensity, flood management is an important part of climate change adaptation and climate resilience. For example, to prevent or manage coastal flooding, coastal management practices have to handle natural processes like tides but also sea level rise due to climate change. The prevention and mitigation of flooding can be studied on three levels: on individual properties, small communities, and whole towns or cities.

== Terminology ==
Flood management is a broad term that includes measures to control or mitigate flood waters, such as actions to prevent floods from occurring or to minimize their impacts when they do occur.

Flood management methods can be structural or non-structural:

- Structural flood management (i.e.: flood control) is the reduction of the effects of a flood using physical solutions, such as reservoirs, levees, dredging and diversions.
- Non-structural flood management includes land-use planning, advanced warning systems and flood insurance. Further examples are: "zoning ordinances and codes, flood forecasting, flood proofing, evacuation and channel clearing, flood fight activities, and upstream land treatment or management to control flood damages without physically restraining flood waters".

There are several related terms that are closely connected or encompassed by flood management.

Flood management can include flood risk management, which focuses on measures to reduce risk, vulnerability and exposure to flood disasters and providing risk analysis through, for example, flood risk assessment. In the context of natural hazards and disasters, risk management involves "plans, actions, strategies or policies to reduce the likelihood and/or magnitude of adverse potential consequences, based on assessed or perceived risks".

Flood control, flood protection, flood defence and flood alleviation are all terms that mean "the detention and/or diversion of water during flood events for the purpose of reducing discharge or downstream inundation". Flood control is part of environmental engineering. It involves the management of water movement, such as redirecting flood run-off through the use of floodwalls and flood gates to prevent floodwaters from reaching a particular area.

Flood mitigation is a related but separate concept describing a broader set of strategies taken to reduce flood risk and potential impact while improving resilience against flood events. These methods include prevention, prediction (which enables flood warnings and evacuation), proofing (e.g.: zoning regulations), physical control (nature-based solutions and physical structures like dams and flood walls) and insurance (e.g.: flood insurance policies).

Flood relief methods are used to reduce the effects of flood waters or high water levels during a flooding event. They include evacuation plans and rescue operations. Flood relief is part of the response and recovery phase in a flood management plan.

== Causes of flooding ==
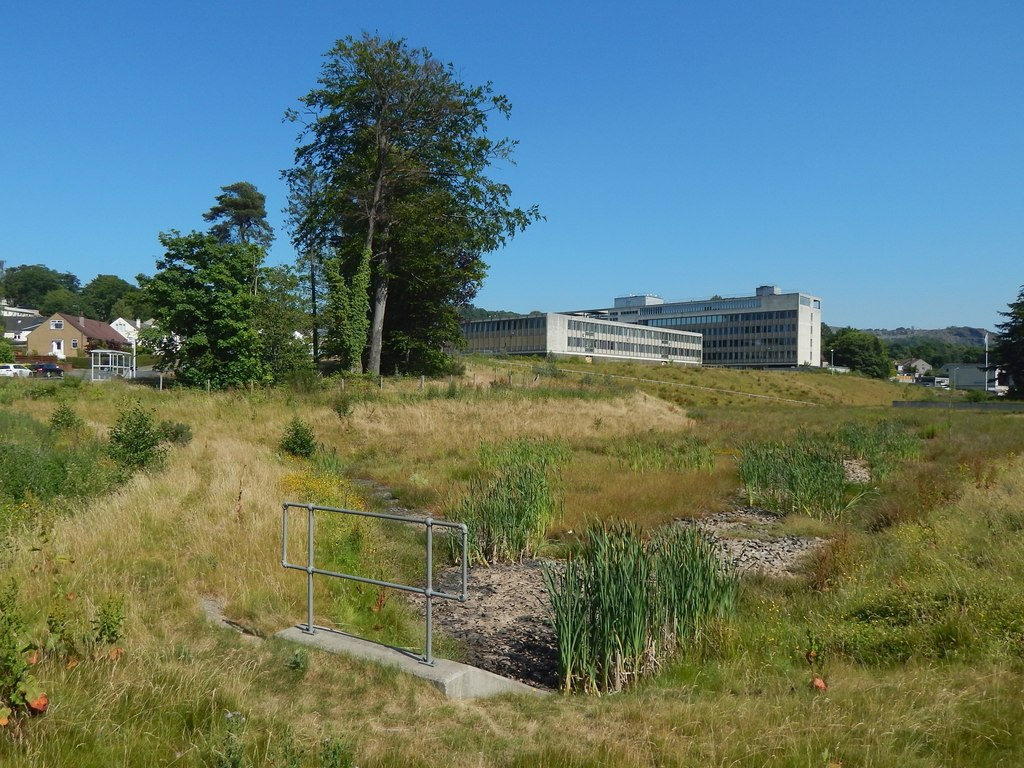
A floodwater storage pond, in its usual empty state. It is intended to soak up flood water and release it slowly.

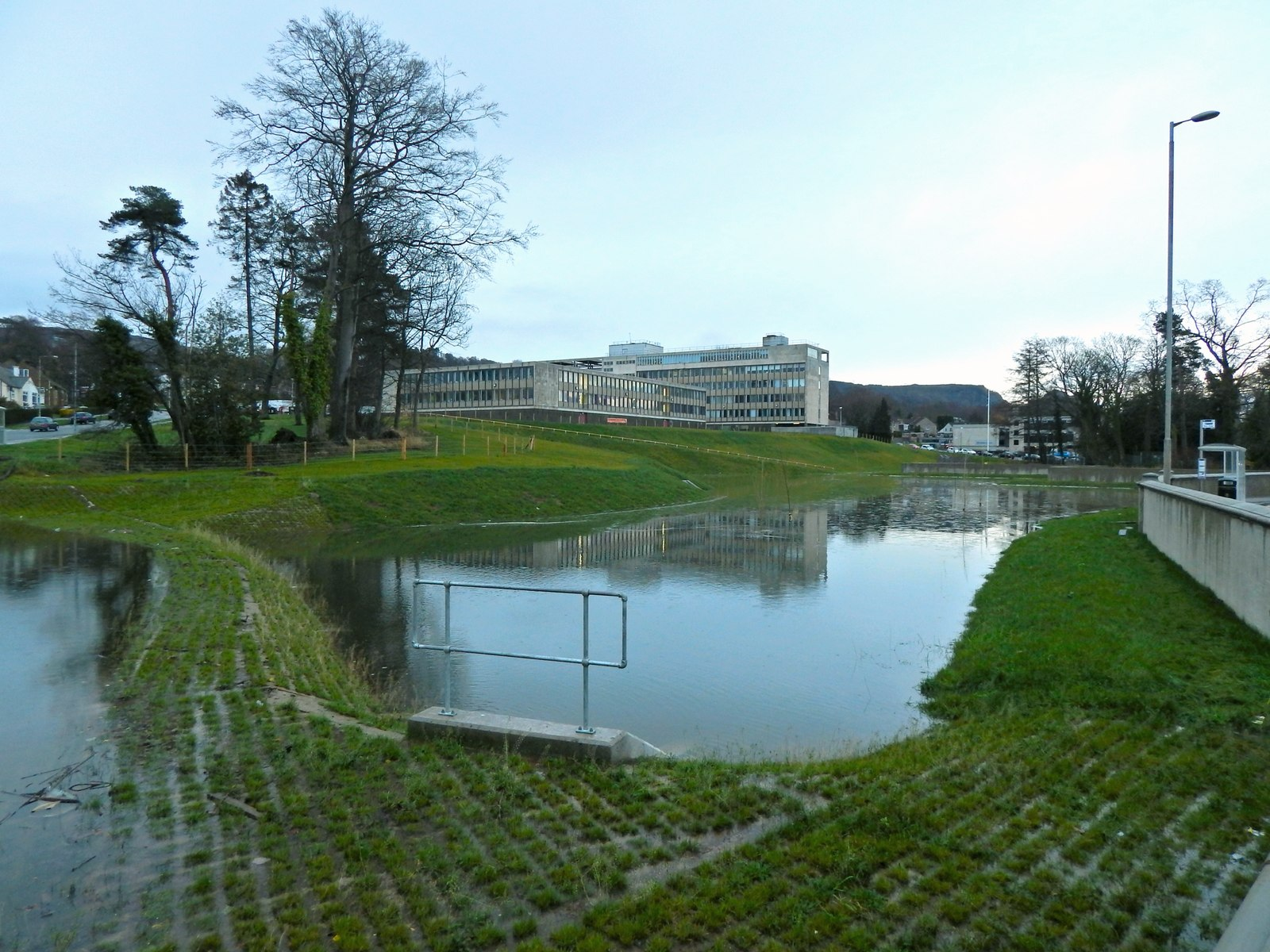
The same pond, full of the water it is detaining, during a flood. Once the peak of the flood has passed, it will slowly drain again.

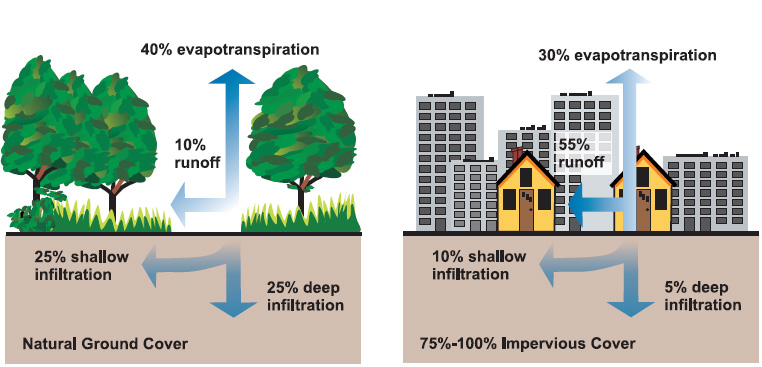
Relationship between impervious surfaces and surface runoff

=== Precipitation, absorption, and runoff ===
Floods are caused by many factors or a combination of any of these generally prolonged heavy rainfall (locally concentrated or throughout a catchment area), highly accelerated snowmelt, severe winds over water, unusual high tides, tsunamis, or failure of dams, levees, retention ponds, or other structures that retained the water. Flooding can be exacerbated by increased amounts of impervious surface or by other natural hazards such as wildfires, which reduce the supply of vegetation that can absorb rainfall.

During times of rain, some of the water is retained in ponds or soil, some is absorbed by grass and vegetation, some evaporates, and the rest travels over the land as surface runoff. Floods occur when ponds, lakes, riverbeds, soil, and vegetation cannot absorb all the water.

This has been exacerbated by human activities such as draining wetlands that naturally store large amounts of water and building paved surfaces that do not absorb any water. Water then runs off the land in quantities that cannot be carried within stream channels or retained in natural ponds, lakes, and human-made reservoirs. About 30 percent of all precipitation becomes runoff and that amount might be increased by water from melting snow.

=== Flood levels: blunting the peak ===
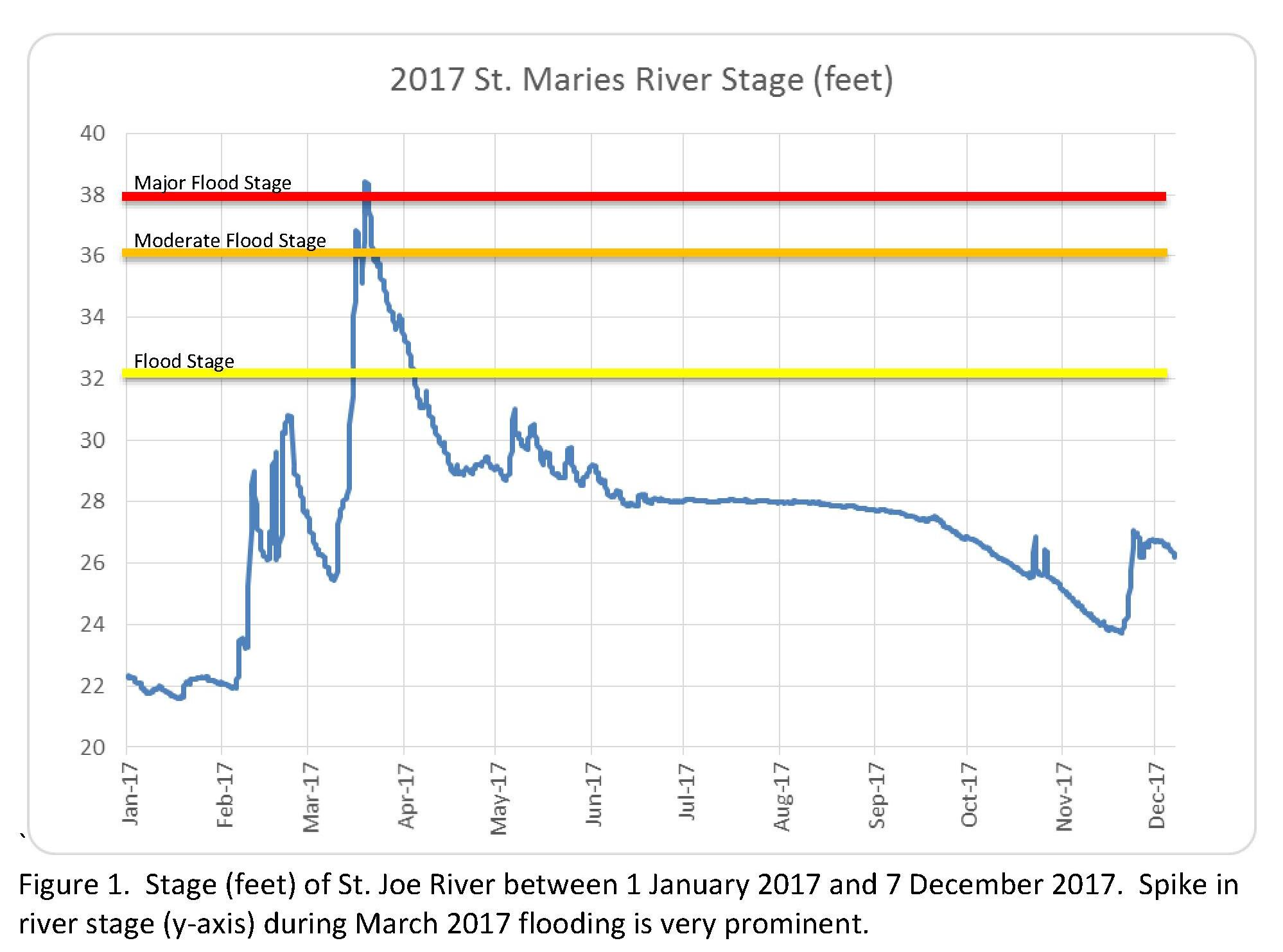
Really bad floods are caused by really brief spikes of river level. Slowing the water, soaking it up then letting it drain again once the peak is past, spreads the flow out over time and blunts the flood peak.

Water levels during a flood tend to rise, then fall, very abruptly. The peak flood level occurs as a very steep, short spike; a quick spurt of water. Anything that slows the surface runoff (marshes, meanders, vegetation, porous materials, turbulent flow, the river spreading over a floodplain) will slow some of the flow more than other parts, spreading the flow over time and blunting the spike. Even slightly blunting the spike significantly decreases the peak flood level. Generally, the higher the peak flood level, the more flood damage is done. Modern flood control seeks to "slow the flow", and deliberately flood some low-lying areas, ideally vegetated, to act as sponges, letting them drain again as the floodwaters go down.

== Purposes ==
Where floods interact with housing, industry and farming that flood management is indicated and in such cases environmentally helpful solutions may provide solutions. Natural flooding has many beneficial environmental effects. This kind of flooding is usually a seasonal occurrence where floods help replenish soil fertility, restore wetlands and promote biodiversity.

=== Reducing the impacts of floods ===
Flooding has many impacts. It damages property and endangers the lives of humans and other species. Rapid water runoff causes soil erosion and concomitant sediment deposition elsewhere (such as further downstream or down a coast). The spawning grounds for fish and other wildlife habitats can become polluted or completely destroyed. Some prolonged high floods can delay traffic in areas which lack elevated roadways. Floods can interfere with drainage and economical use of lands, such as interfering with farming. Structural damage can occur in bridge abutments, bank lines, sewer lines, and other structures within floodways. Waterway navigation and hydroelectric power are often impaired. Financial losses due to floods are typically millions of dollars each year, with the worst floods in recent U.S. history having cost billions of dollars.

=== Protection of individual properties ===
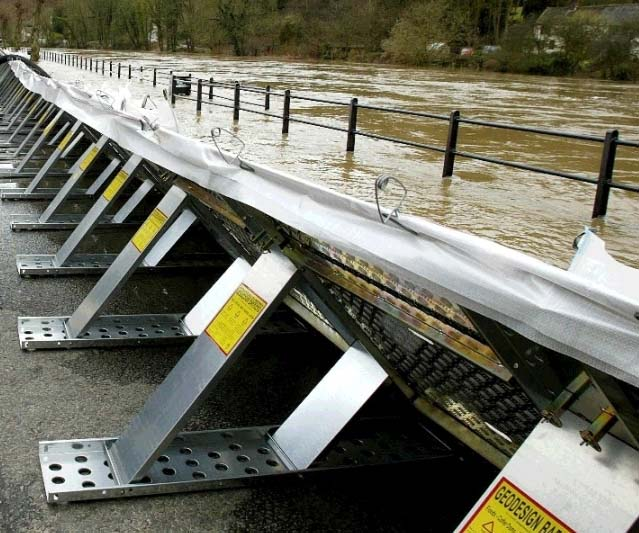
Emergency flood barrier

Property owners may fit their homes to stop water entering by blocking doors and air vents, waterproofing important areas and sandbagging the edges of the building. Private precautionary measures are increasingly important in flood risk management.

Flood mitigation at the property level may also involve preventative measures focused on the building site, including scour protection for shoreline developments, improving rainwater in filtration through the use of permeable paving materials and grading away from structures, and inclusion of berms, wetlands or swales in the landscape.

=== Protection of communities ===
When more homes, shops and infrastructure are threatened by the effects of flooding, then the benefits of protection are worth the additional cost. Temporary flood defenses can be constructed in certain locations which are prone to floods and provide protection from rising flood waters. Rivers running through large urban developments are often controlled and channeled. Water rising above a canal's full capacity may cause flooding to spread to other waterways and areas of the community, which causes damage. Defenses (both long-term and short-term) can be constructed to minimize damage, which involves raising the edge of the water with levees, embankments or walls. The high population and value of infrastructure at risk often justifies the high cost of mitigation in larger urban areas.

=== Protection of wider areas such as towns or cities ===
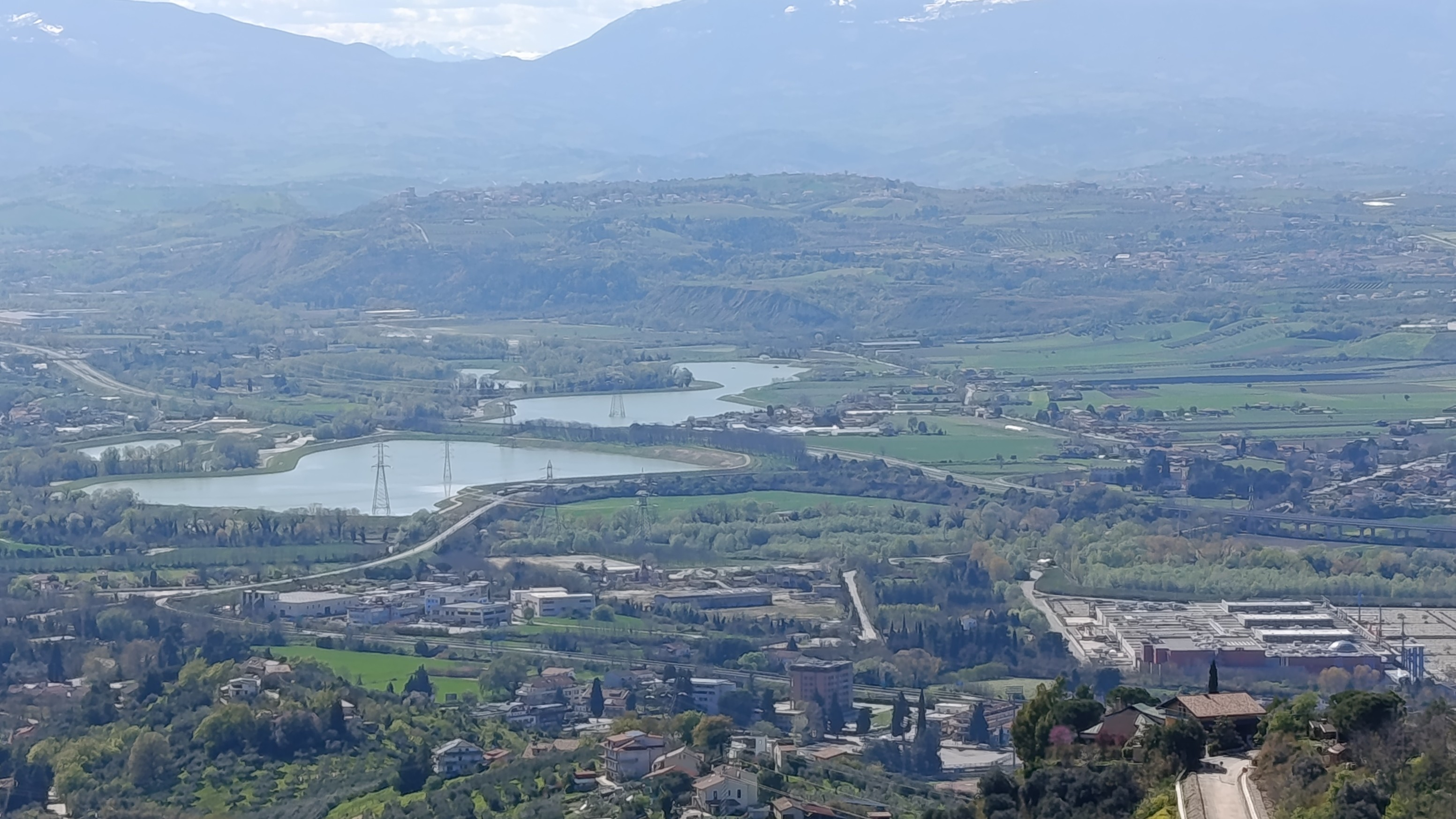
Large retention basins of the Pescara river (Italy) after heavy rainfall

The most effective way of reducing the risk to people and property is through the production of flood risk maps. Most countries have produced maps which show areas prone to flooding based on flood data. In the UK, the Environment Agency has produced maps which show areas at risk. The map to the right shows a flood map for the City of York, including the floodplain for a 1 in 100-year flood (dark blue), the predicted floodplain for a 1 in 1000 year flood (light blue) and low-lying areas in need of flood defence (purple). The most sustainable way of reducing risk is to prevent further development in flood-prone areas and old waterways. It is important for at-risk communities to develop a comprehensive Floodplain Management plan.

In the US, communities that participate in the National Flood Insurance Program must agree to regulate development in flood-prone areas.

=== Strategic retreat ===
One way of reducing the damage caused by flooding is to remove buildings from flood-prone areas, leaving them as parks or returning them to wilderness. Floodplain buyout programs have been operated in places like New Jersey (both before and after Hurricane Sandy), Charlotte, North Carolina, and Missouri.

In the United States, FEMA produces flood insurance rate maps that identify areas of future risk, enabling local governments to apply zoning regulations to prevent or minimize property damage.

=== Resilience ===
Buildings and other urban infrastructure can be designed so that even if a flood does happen, the city can recover quickly and costs are minimized. For example, homes can be put on stilts or build on an elevated level. Electrical and HVAC equipment can be put on the roof instead of in the basement, and subway entrances and tunnels can have built-in movable water barriers. New York City began a substantial effort to plan and build for flood resilience after Hurricane Sandy. Flood resilience technologies support the fast recovery of individuals and communities affected, but their use remains limited.

=== Climate change adaptation ===
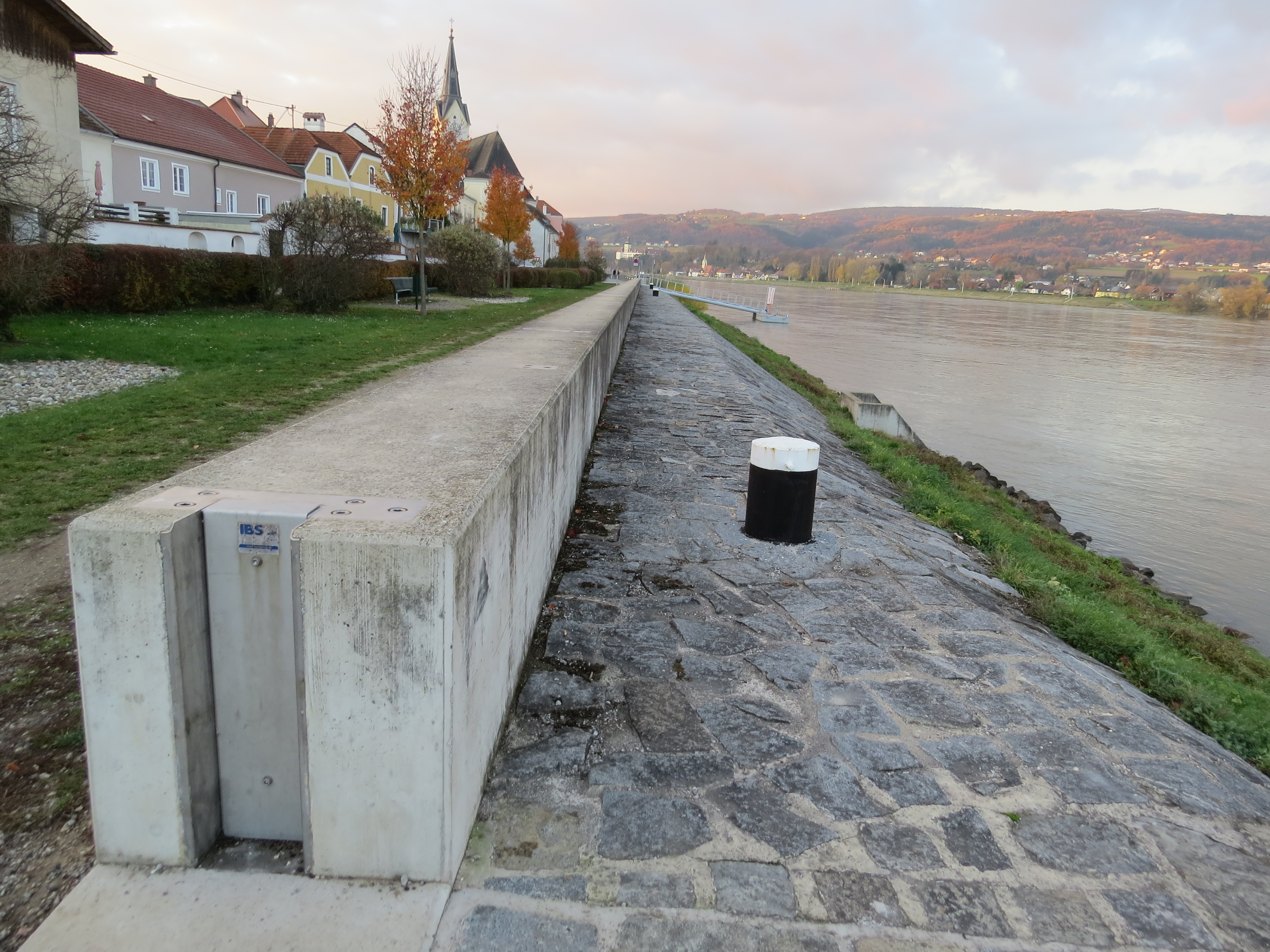
Flood protection for town of Ybbs along the river Donau

Flooding can occur in cities or towns as urban flooding. It can also take place by the sea as coastal flooding. Sea level rise can make coastal flooding worse. In some areas there are also risks of glacial lake outburst floods.

There are many adaptation options for flooding:

- Installing better flood defences such as flood barriers, sea walls and increased pumping capacity
- Installing devices to prevent seawater from backflowing into storm drains
- Rainwater storage to deal with increased run-off from rainfall. This includes reducing paved areas or changing to water-permeable pavements, adding water-buffering vegetation, adding underground storage tanks, and subsidizing household rain barrels
- Raising pumps at wastewater treatment plants
- Buying out homeowners in flood-prone areas
- Raising street level to prevent flooding
- Using and protecting mangroves
- Glacial lakes in danger of outburst flooding can have their moraines replaced with concrete dams to provide protection. This may also provide hydroelectric power

More frequent drenching rains may make it necessary to increase the capacity of stormwater systems. This separates stormwater from blackwater, so that overflows in peak periods do not contaminate rivers. One example is the SMART Tunnel in Kuala Lumpur.

New York City produced a comprehensive report for its Rebuilding and Resiliency initiative after Hurricane Sandy. It includes making buildings less prone to flooding. It also aims to make specific problems encountered during and after the storm less likely to recur. These include weeks-long fuel shortages even in unaffected areas due to legal and transportation problems, flooded health care facilities, insurance premium increases, damage to electricity and steam generation and distribution networks, and flooding of subway and roadway tunnels.

== Structural methods ==
Some methods of flood control have been practiced since ancient times. These methods include planting vegetation to retain extra water, terracing hillsides to slow flow downhill, and the construction of floodways (man-made channels to divert floodwater). Other techniques include the construction of levees, lakes, dams, reservoirs, retention ponds to hold extra water during times of flooding.

=== Dams ===
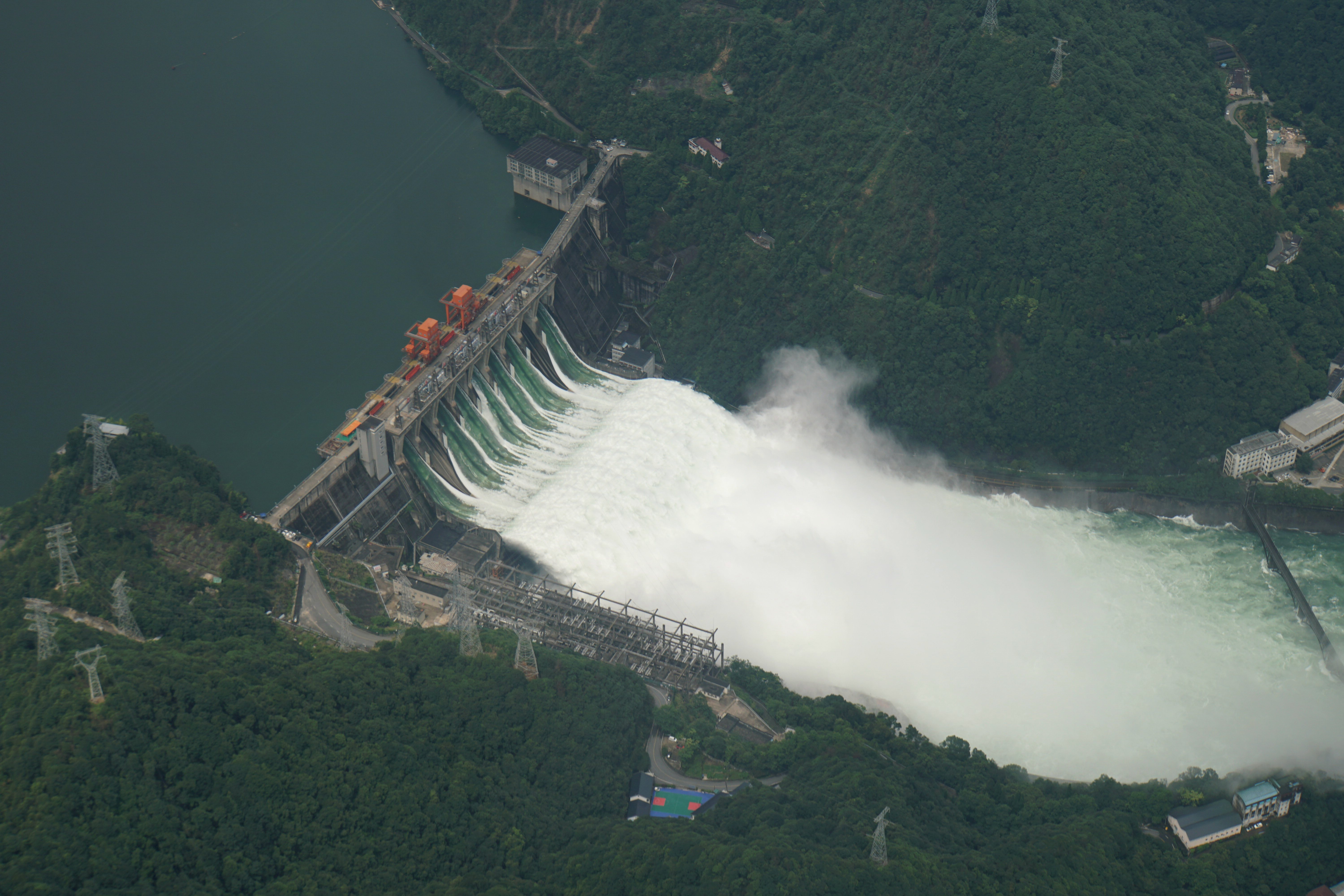
Flood Discharging at Xin'an River Dam during 2020 China floods

Many dams and their associated reservoirs are designed completely or partially to aid in flood protection and control. Many large dams have flood-control reservations in which the level of a reservoir must be kept below a certain elevation before the onset of the rainy/summer melt season to allow a certain amount of space in which floodwaters can fill. Other beneficial uses of dam created reservoirs include hydroelectric power generation, water conservation, and recreation. Reservoir and dam construction and design is based upon standards, typically set out by the government. In the United States, dam and reservoir design is regulated by the US Army Corps of Engineers (USACE). Design of a dam and reservoir follows guidelines set by the USACE and covers topics such as design flow rates in consideration to meteorological, topographic, streamflow, and soil data for the watershed above the structure.

The term dry dam refers to a dam that serves purely for flood control without any conservation storage (e.g. Mount Morris Dam, Seven Oaks Dam).

=== Diversion canals ===
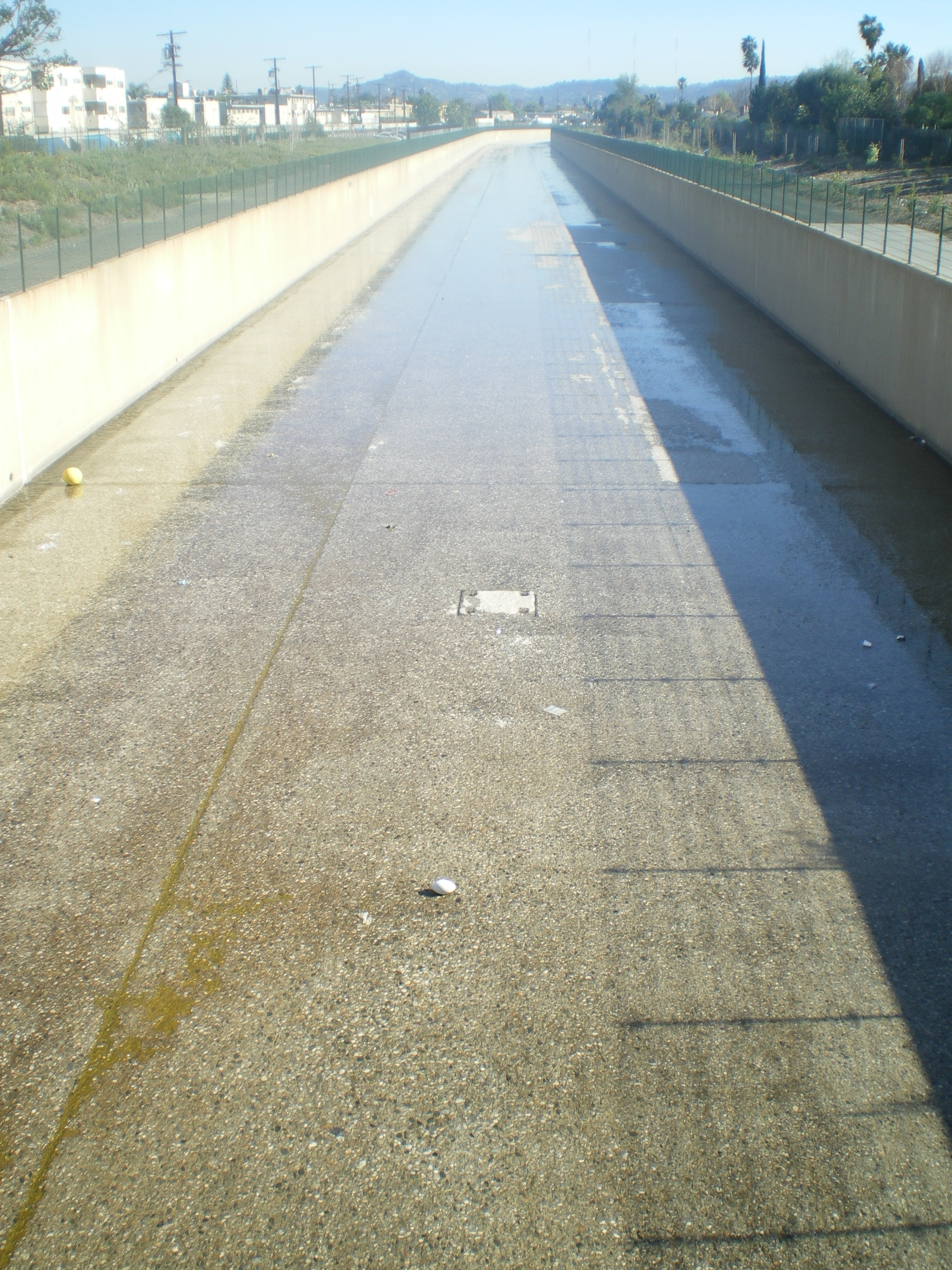
Tujunga Wash is an example of a concrete flood control channel. The concrete has previously failed during floods.

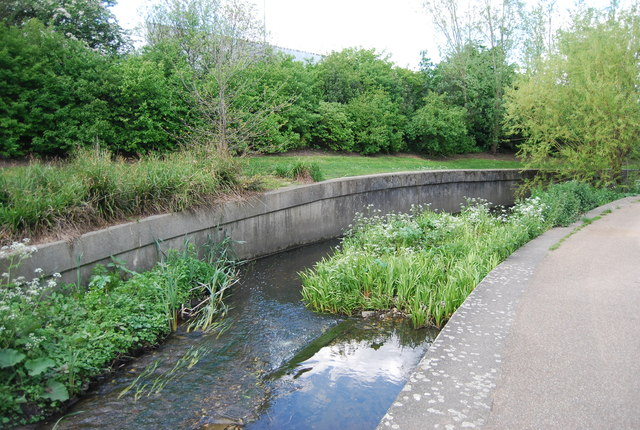
In contrast, a channelized part of the River Ravensbourne, with deliberate gravel shoals and plantings in its bed to make the flow meander and slow it down. This is cheaper than demolishing the concrete (see images below). The adjacent park also acts as a floodplain.

Flood control channels are large and empty basins where surface water can flow through but is not retained (except during flooding), or dry channels that run below the street levels of some larger cities, so that if a flash flood occurs the excess water can drain out along these channels into a river or other bodies of water. Flood channels are sometimes built on the former courses of natural waterways as a way to reduce flooding.

Channelization of this sort was commonly done in the 1960s, but is now often being undone, with "rechannelization" through meandering, vegetated, and porous paths. This is because channelizing the flow in a concrete chute often made flooding worse.

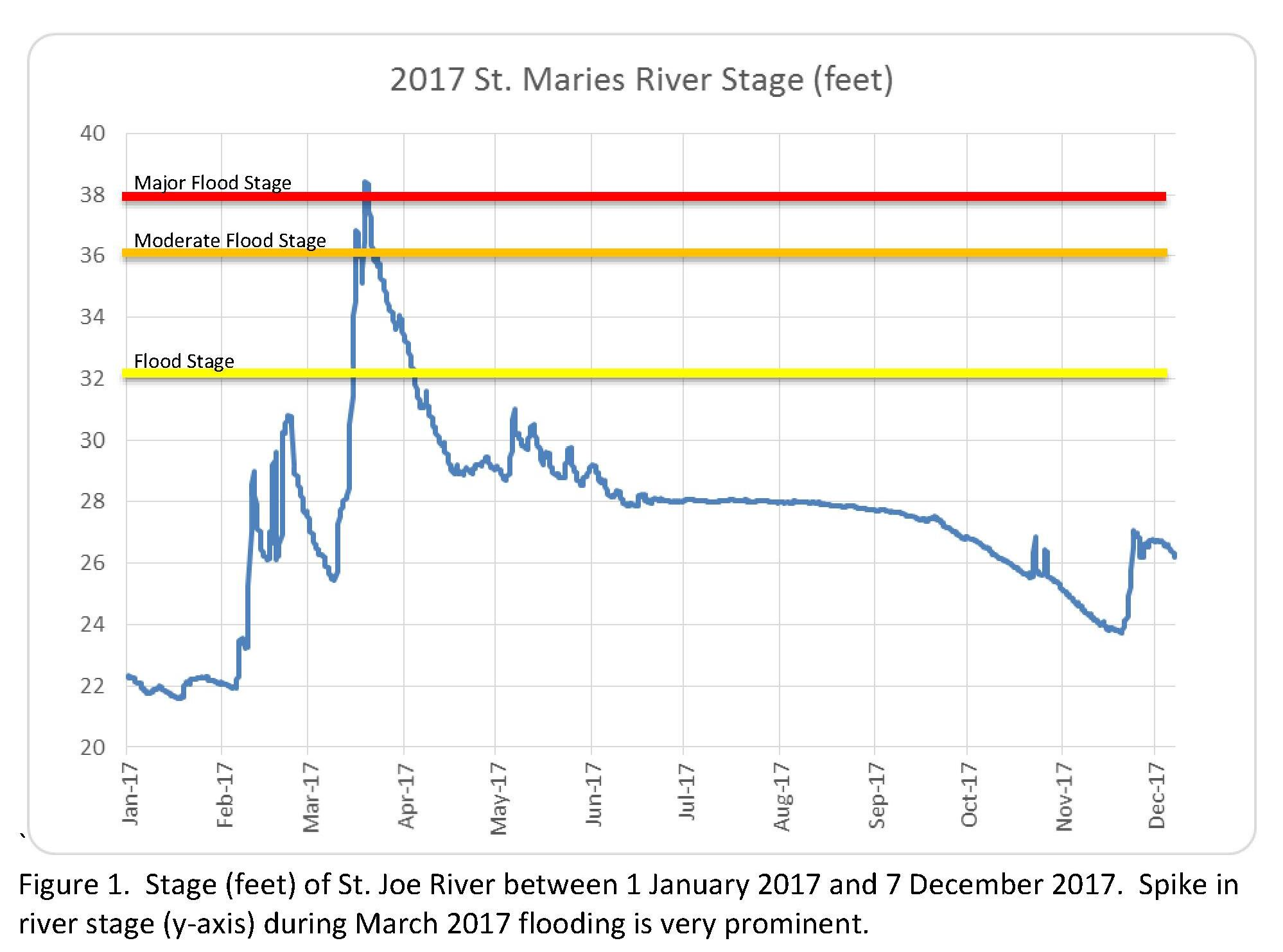
Really bad floods are caused by really brief spikes of river level. Channellization in concrete chutes speeds the water up and makes the flood peak higher, while slowing the water down spreads the flow out over time and blunts the flood peak.

Water levels during a flood tend to rise, then fall, exponentially. The peak flood level occurs as a very steep, short spike; a quick spurt of water. Anything that slows the surface runoff (marshes, meanders, vegetation, porous materials, turbulent flow, the river spreading over a floodplain) will slow some of the flow more than other parts, spreading the flow over time and blunting the spike. Even slightly blunting the spike significantly decreases the peak flood level. Generally, the higher the peak flood level, the more flood damage is done. Straight, clear, smooth concrete-walled channels speed up flow, and are therefore likely to make flooding downstream worse. Modern flood control seeks to "slow the flow", and deliberately flood some low-lying areas, ideally vegetated, to act as sponges, letting them drain again as the floodwaters go down.

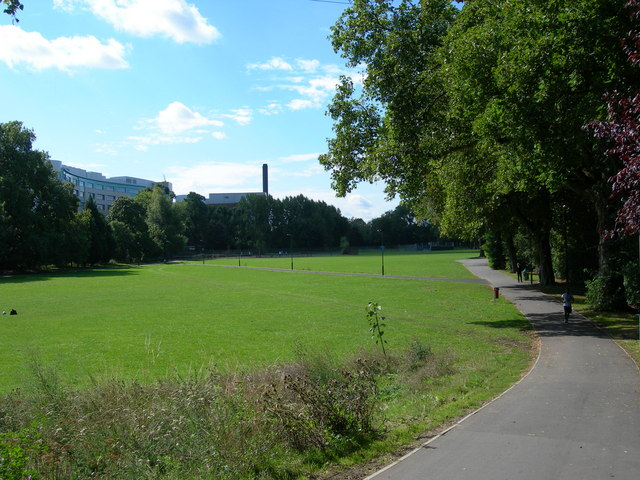
Before. Note chimney in this picture and next.

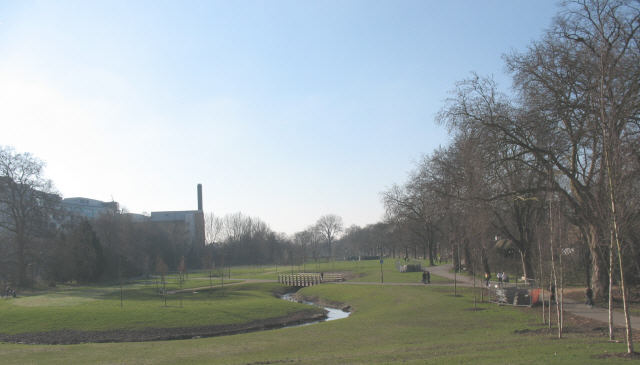
Immediately after re-meandering.

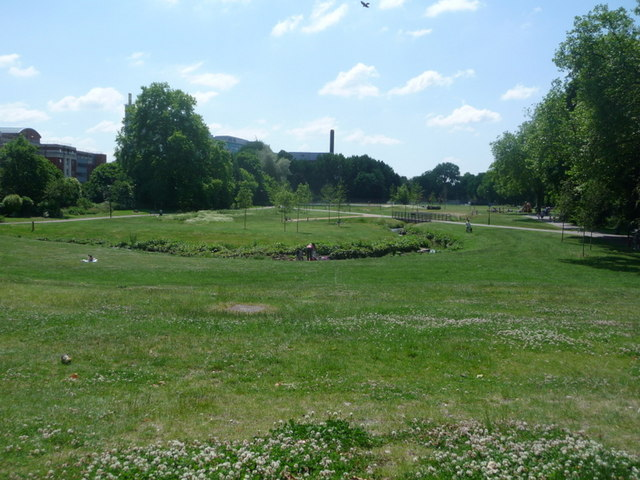
A year later, when the banks have renaturalized somewhat.

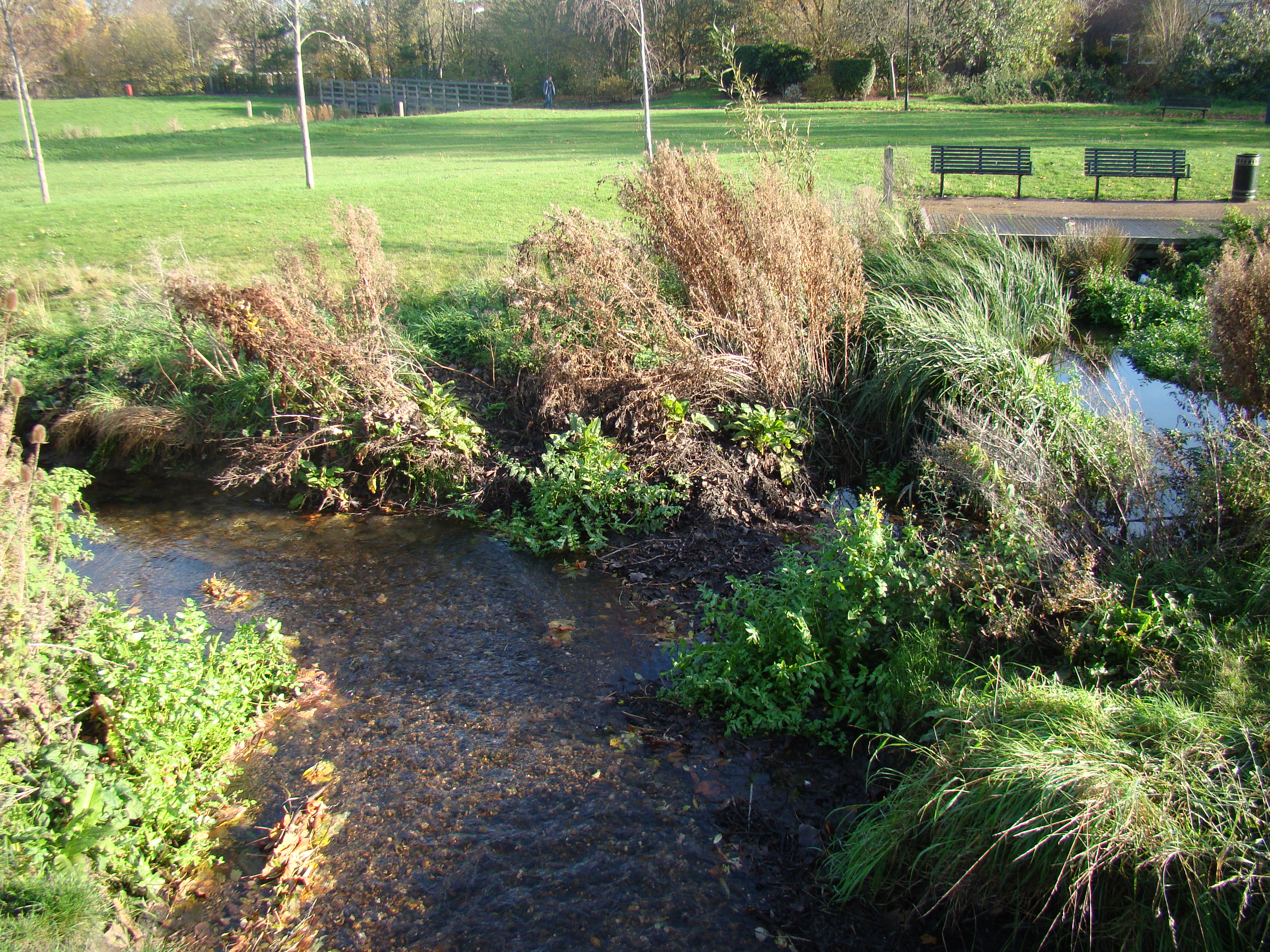
Three years after re-meandering.
Another part of the River Ravensbourne has been removed from the concrete and re-meandered. Park use more than doubled, and most people went from feeling unsafe there to feeling safe.
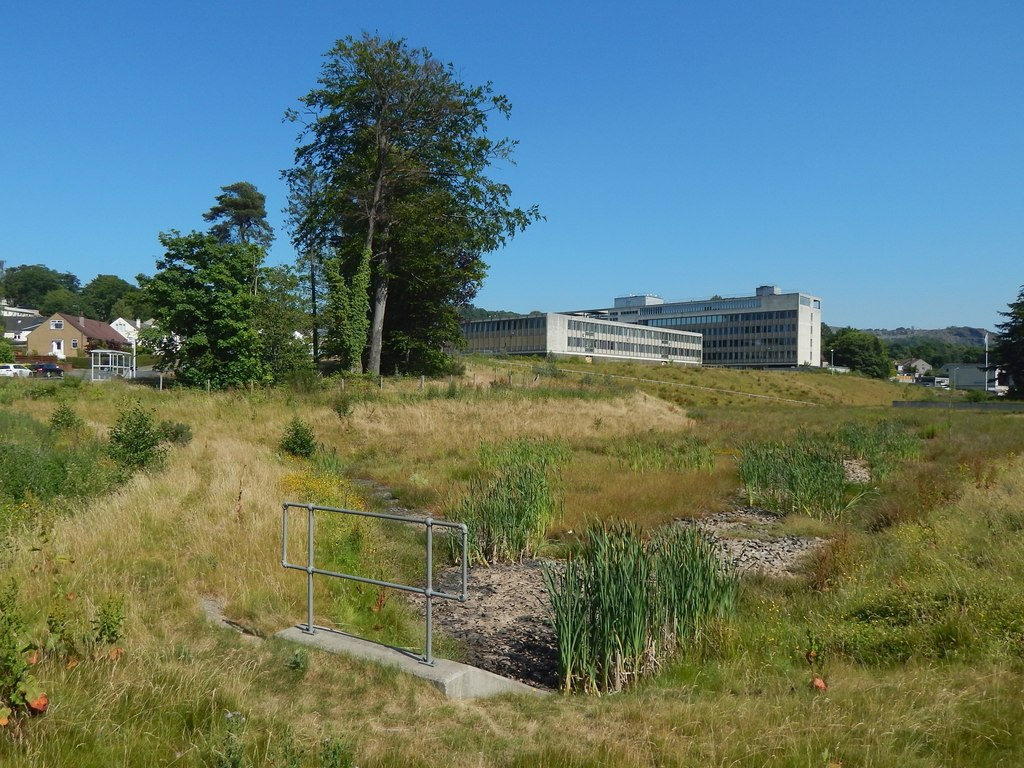
A more modern flood control measure, a flood storage pond, intended to soak up flood water and release it slowly.

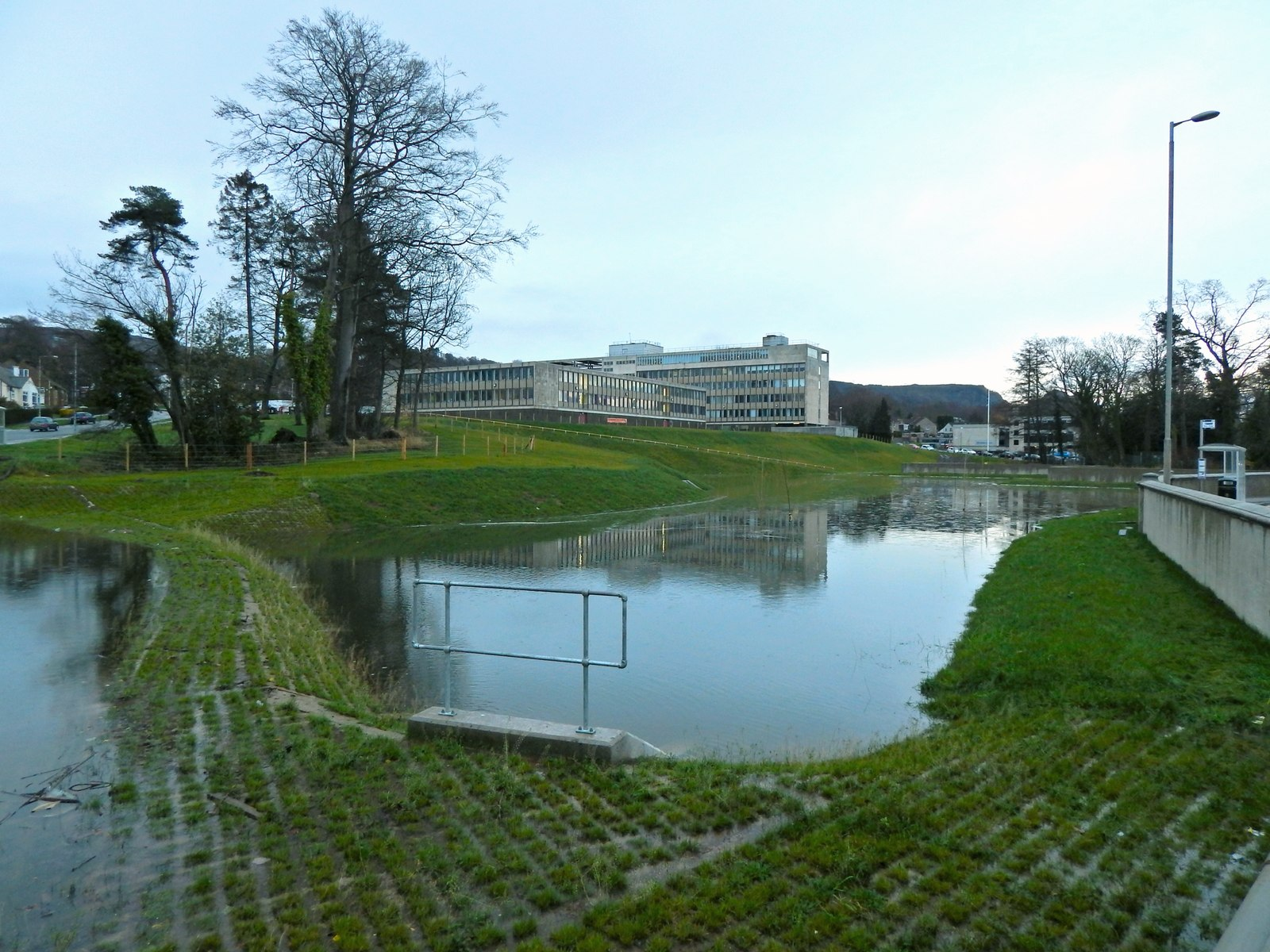
The same pond, full of the water it is detaining, during a flood.

=== Floodplains and groundwater replenishment ===
Excess water can be used for groundwater replenishment by diversion onto land that can absorb the water. This technique can reduce the impact of later droughts by using the ground as a natural reservoir. It is being used in California, where orchards and vineyards can be flooded without damaging crops, or in other places wilderness areas have been re-engineered to act as floodplains.

=== River defenses ===
In many countries, rivers are prone to floods and are often carefully managed. Defenses such as levees, bunds, reservoirs, and weirs are used to prevent rivers from bursting their banks. A weir, also known as a lowhead dam, is most often used to create millponds, but on the Humber River in Toronto, a weir was built near Raymore Drive to prevent a recurrence of the flood damage caused by Hurricane Hazel in October 1954.

The Leeds flood alleviation scheme uses movable weirs which are lowered during periods of high water to reduce the chances of flooding upstream. Two such weirs, the first in the UK, were installed on the River Aire in October 2017 at Crown Point, Leeds city centre and Knostrop. The Knostrop weir was operated during the 2019 England floods. They are designed to reduce potential flood levels by up to one metre.

=== Coastal defenses ===
Coastal flooding is addressed with coastal defenses, such as sea walls, beach nourishment, and barrier islands.

Tide gates are used in conjunction with dykes and culverts. They can be placed at the mouth of streams or small rivers, where an estuary begins or where tributary streams, or drainage ditches connect to sloughs. Tide gates close during incoming tides to prevent tidal waters from moving upland, and open during outgoing tides to allow waters to drain out via the culvert and into the estuary side of the dike. The opening and closing of the gates is driven by a difference in water level on either side of the gate.

=== Flood barrier ===
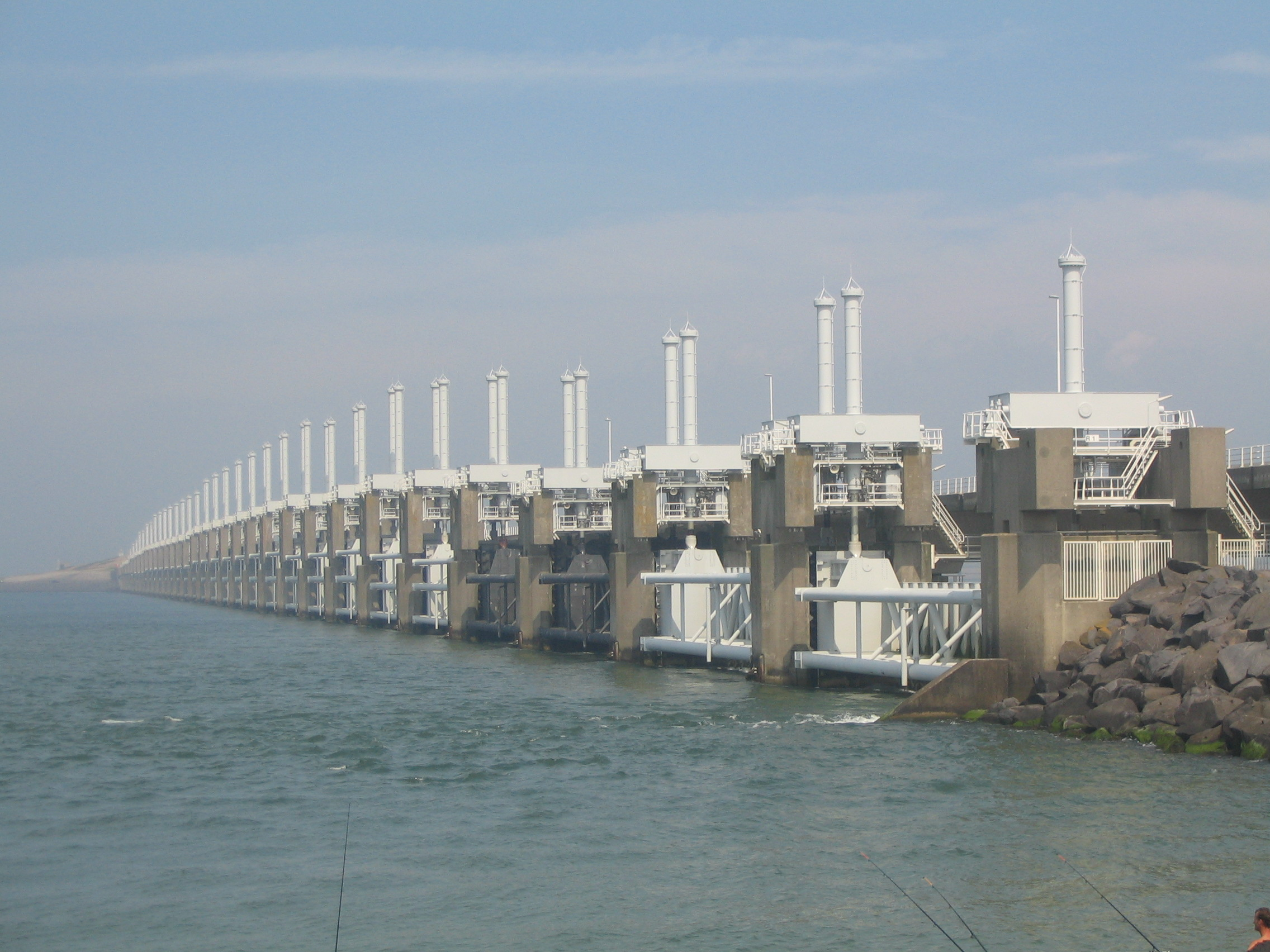
The Oosterscheldekering contains 62 steel doors, each 42 metres (138 ft) wide

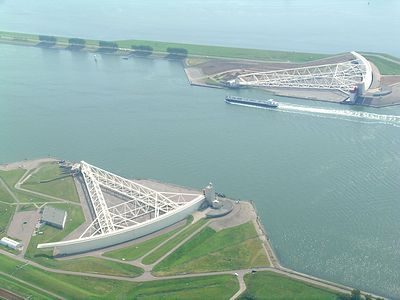
The Maeslantkering closes the main entrance to the Port of Rotterdam, the largest port in Europe.

A flood barrier, surge barrier or storm surge barrier is a specific type of floodgate, designed to prevent a storm surge or spring tide from flooding the protected area behind the barrier. A surge barrier is almost always part of a larger flood protection system consisting of floodwalls, levees (also known as dikes), and other constructions and natural geographical features. Flood barrier may also refer to barriers placed around or at individual buildings to keep floodwaters from entering the buildings.

==== Self-closing flood barrier ====
The self-closing flood barrier (SCFB) is a flood defense system designed to protect people and property from inland waterway floods caused by heavy rainfall, gales, or rapid melting snow. The SCFB can be built to protect residential properties and whole communities, as well as industrial or other strategic areas. The barrier system is constantly ready to deploy in a flood situation, it can be installed in any length and uses the rising flood water to deploy.

=== Temporary perimeter barriers ===
When permanent defenses fail, emergency measures such as sandbags, inflatable impermeable sacks, or other temporary barriers are used.

In 1988, a method of using water to control flooding was discovered. This was accomplished by containing 2 parallel tubes within a third outer tube. When filled, this structure formed a non-rolling wall of water that can control 80 percent of its height in external water depth, with dry ground behind it. Eight foot tall water filled barriers were used to surround Fort Calhoun Nuclear Generating Station during the 2011 Missouri River Flooding. Instead of trucking in sandbag material for a flood, stacking it, then trucking it out to a hazmat disposal site, flood control can be accomplished by using the on site water. However, these are not fool proof. A 8 feet (2.4 m) high 2,000 feet (610 m) long water filled rubber flood berm that surrounded portions of the plant was punctured by a skid-steer loader and it collapsed flooding a portion of the facility.

AquaFence consists of interlocking panels which are waterproof and puncture-resistant, can be bolted down to resist winds, and use the weight of floodwater to hold them in place. Materials include marine-grade batlic laminate, stainless steel, aluminum and reinforced PVC canvas. The panels are reusable and can be stored flat between uses. The technology was designed as an alternative to building seawalls or placing sandbags in the path of floodwaters.

Other solutions, such as HydroSack, are polypropylene exteriors with wood pulp within, though they are one-time use.

== Non-structural methods ==
=== Flood risk assessment ===
There are several methods of non-structural flood management that form part of flood risk management strategies. These can involve policies that reduces the amount of urban structures built around floodplains or flood prone areas through land zoning regulations. This helps to reduce the amount of mitigation needed to protect humans and buildings from flooding events. Similarly, flood warning systems are important for reducing risks. Following the occurrence of flooding events, other measures such as rebuilding plans and insurance can be integrated into flood risk management plans. Flood risk management strategy diversification is needed to ensure that management strategies cover several different scenarios and ensure best practices.

Flood risk management aims to reduce the human and socio-economic losses caused by flooding and is part of the larger field of risk management. Flood risk management analyzes the relationships between physical systems and socio-economic environments through flood risk assessment and tries to create understanding and action about the risks posed by flooding. The relationships cover a wide range of topics, from drivers and natural processes, to models and socio-economic consequences.

This relationship examines management methods which includes a wide range of flood management methods including but are not limited to flood mapping and physical implication measures. Flood risk management looks at how to reduce flood risk and how to appropriately manage risks that are associated with flooding. Flood risk management includes mitigating and preparing for flooding disasters, analyzing risk, and providing a risk analysis system to mitigate the negative impacts caused by flooding.

Flooding and flood risk are especially important with more extreme weather and sea level rise caused by climate change as more areas will be effected by flood risk.

=== Flood mapping ===
Flood mapping is a tool used by governments and policy makers to delineate the borders of potential flooding events, allowing educated decisions to prevent extreme flooding events. Flood maps are useful to create documentation that allows policy makers to make informed decisions about flood hazards. Flood mapping also provides conceptual models to both the public and private sectors with information about flooding hazards. Flood mapping has been criticized in many areas around the world, due to the absence of public accessibility, technical writing and data, and lack of easy-to-understand information. However, revived attention towards flood mapping has renewed the interest in enhancing current flood mapping for use as a flood risk management method.

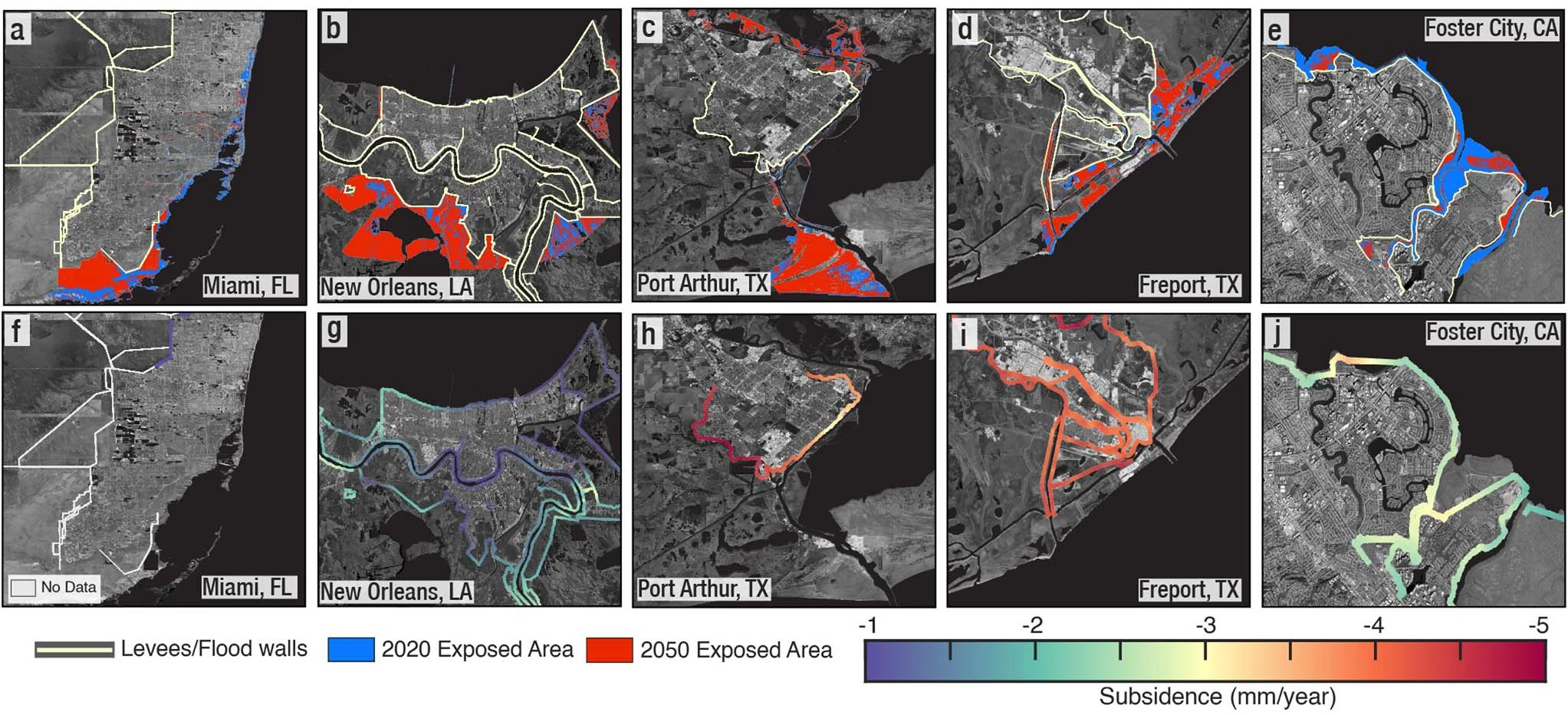
Flood maps of American cities indicating areas susceptible to flooding in the future.

=== Flood modelling ===
Flood modelling is a tool used to model flood hazard and the effects on humans and the physical environment. Flood modelling takes into consideration how flood hazards, external and internal processes and factors, and the main drivers of floods interact with each other. Flood modelling combines factors such as terrain, hydrology, and urban topography to reproduce the evolution of a flood in order to identify the different levels of flooding risks associated with each element exposed. The modelling can be carried out using hydraulic models, conceptual models, or geomorphic methods. Nowadays, there is a growing attention also in the production of maps obtained with remote sensing. Flood modelling is helpful for determining building development practices and hazard mitigation methods that reduce the risks associated with flooding.

=== Flood hazard mapping ===
A flood hazard map is essential for flood management because it allows you to understand and visualize the areas that are most vulnerable to flooding under different scenarios. As an example, in Bangladesh, where nearly 80% of the population lives in low-lying floodplains, such a map aids in identifying areas prone to recurring or severe flooding caused by seasonal monsoon rains and river overflows. Hazard maps provide critical insights into disaster preparedness and planning by taking into account factors such as elevation, landform, slope, population density, and proximity to rivers and settlements. They assist local and national authorities in prioritizing high-risk zones, implementing preventive measures, and making informed resource allocation decisions to minimize loss of life, damage to infrastructure, and economic disruption during flood events.

=== Flood shelter suitability mapping ===
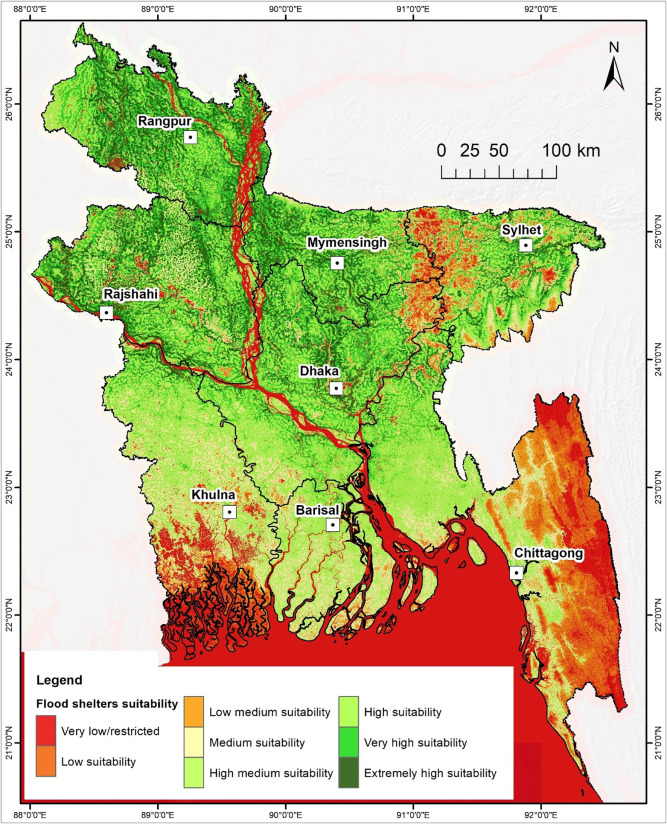
A map of Bangladesh showing areas suitable for the construction of flood shelters

Knowing the flood risk is not always enough; a flood shelter suitability map is also helpful because it identifies the safest and most accessible locations for establishing emergency shelters. Nowadays in Bangladesh, the number of casualties from cyclones has reduced as many cyclone shelters have been established. In flood-prone areas of Bangladesh, where designated shelters are scarce and frequently poorly located, such maps incorporate criteria such as flood risk levels, road and settlement accessibility, elevation, and land use. These maps ensure that shelters are built on safe, elevated, and accessible sites, allowing for efficient evacuation and lowering the risk of casualties during flooding. They support evidence-based planning by government agencies and humanitarian organizations to ensure shelters are both structurally safe and strategically placed to serve as many people as possible during emergencies.

=== Stakeholder engagement ===
Stakeholder engagement is a useful tool for flood risk management that allows enhanced public engagement for agreements to be reached on policy discussions. Different management considerations can be taken into account, including emergency management and disaster risk reduction goals, interactions of land-use planning with the integration of flood risks and required policies. In flood management, stakeholder engagement is seen as an important way to achieve greater cohesion and consensus. Integrating stakeholder engagement into flood management often provides a more complex analysis of the situation; this generally adds more demand in determining collective solutions and increases the time it takes to determine solutions.

=== Wetland Restoration ===
Wetlands are effective for flood management strategies, particularly in coastal regions, because they are able to hold excess water that flows towards inland regions. For example, the communities of multiple bays and river deltas, including the Chesapeake Bay, the Mississippi River delta, and the Yangtze River delta, benefit from local wetlands with respect to flood management, specifically because wetlands are able to protect inland communities from storm surges that these regions often face. Wetlands also support flood mitigation from a financial perspective. For example, during Hurricane Sandy in 2012, coastal wetlands elicited an estimated $625 million in savings related to the prevention of damage to private property, such as homes, and public infrastructure, such as roadways.

== Costs ==
The costs of flood protection rise as more people and property are to be protected. The US FEMA, for example, estimates that for every $1.00 spent on mitigation, $4.00 is saved.

== Examples by country ==
=== North America ===
==== Canada ====
An elaborate system of flood way defenses can be found in the Canadian province of Manitoba. The Red River flows northward from the United States, passing through the city of Winnipeg (where it meets the Assiniboine River) and into Lake Winnipeg. As is the case with all north-flowing rivers in the temperate zone of the Northern Hemisphere, snow melt in southern sections may cause river levels to rise before northern sections have had a chance to completely thaw. This can lead to devastating flooding, as occurred in Winnipeg during the spring of 1950. To protect the city from future floods, the Manitoba government undertook the construction of a massive system of diversions, dikes, and flood ways (including the Red River Floodway and the Portage Diversion). The system kept Winnipeg safe during the 1997 flood which devastated many communities upriver from Winnipeg, including Grand Forks, North Dakota and Ste. Agathe, Manitoba.

==== United States ====
In the United States, the U.S. Army Corps of Engineers is the lead flood control agency. After Hurricane Sandy, New York City's Metropolitan Transportation Authority (MTA) initiated multiple flood barrier projects to protect the transit assets in Manhattan. In one case, the MTA's New York City Transit Authority (NYCT) sealed subway entrances in lower Manhattan using a deployable fabric cover system called Flex-Gate, a system that protects the subway entrances against 14 feet (4.3 m) of water. Extreme storm flood protection levels have been revised based on new Federal Emergency Management Agency guidelines for 100-year and 500-year design flood elevations.

In the New Orleans Metropolitan Area, 35 percent of which sits below sea level, is protected by hundreds of miles of levees and flood gates. This system failed catastrophically, with numerous breaks, during Hurricane Katrina (2005) in the city proper and in eastern sections of the Metro Area, resulting in the inundation of approximately 50 percent of the metropolitan area, ranging from a few inches to twenty feet in coastal communities.

The Morganza Spillway provides a method of diverting water from the Mississippi River when a river flood threatens New Orleans, Baton Rouge and other major cities on the lower Mississippi. It is the largest of a system of spillways and floodways along the Mississippi. Completed in 1954, the spillway has been opened twice, in 1973 and in 2011.

In an act of successful flood prevention, the federal government offered to buy out flood-prone properties in the United States in order to prevent repeated disasters after the 1993 flood across the Midwest. Several communities accepted and the government, in partnership with the state, bought 25,000 properties which they converted into wetlands. These wetlands act as a sponge in storms and in 1995, when the floods returned, the government did not have to expend resources in those areas.

=== Asia ===
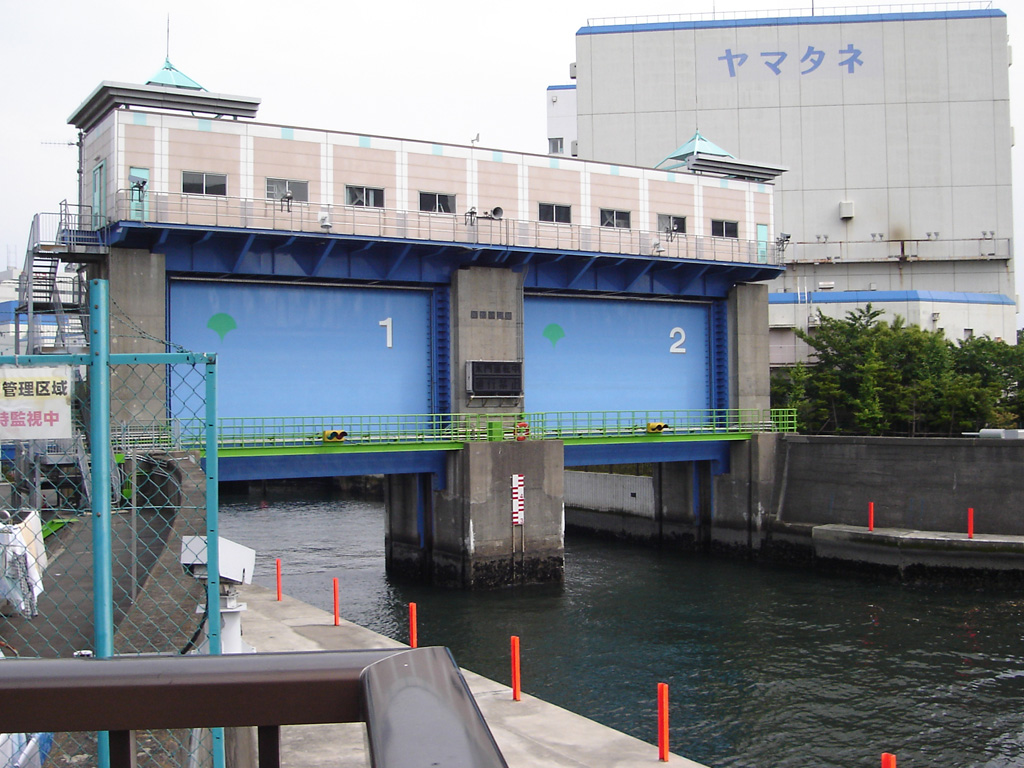
Floodgates in Tokyo, Japan

In Kyoto, Japan, the Hata clan successfully controlled floods on the Katsura River in around 500 A.D and also constructed a sluice on the Kazuno River. A series of flood control projects in the Edo Period resulted in the diversion of the Tone River from flowing to Edo Bay in the south to discharging in the Pacific Ocean in the east.

In China flood diversion areas are rural areas that are deliberately flooded in emergencies in order to protect cities.

The consequences of deforestation and changing land use on the risk and severity of flooding are subjects of discussion. In assessing the impacts of Himalayan deforestation on the Ganges-Brahmaputra Lowlands, it was found that forests would not have prevented or significantly reduced flooding in the case of an extreme weather event. However, more general or overview studies agree on the negative impacts that deforestation has on flood safety - and the positive effects of wise land use and reforestation.

Many have proposed that loss of vegetation (deforestation) will lead to an increased risk of flooding. With natural forest cover the flood duration should decrease. Reducing the rate of deforestation should improve the incidents and severity of floods.

=== Africa ===
In Egypt, both the Aswan Low Dam (1902) and the Aswan High Dam (1976) have controlled various amounts of flooding along the Nile River.

=== Europe ===
==== France ====
Following the misery and destruction caused by the 1910 Great Flood of Paris, the French government built a series of reservoirs called Les Grands Lacs de Seine (or Great Lakes) which helps remove pressure from the Seine during floods, especially the regular winter flooding.

==== United Kingdom ====
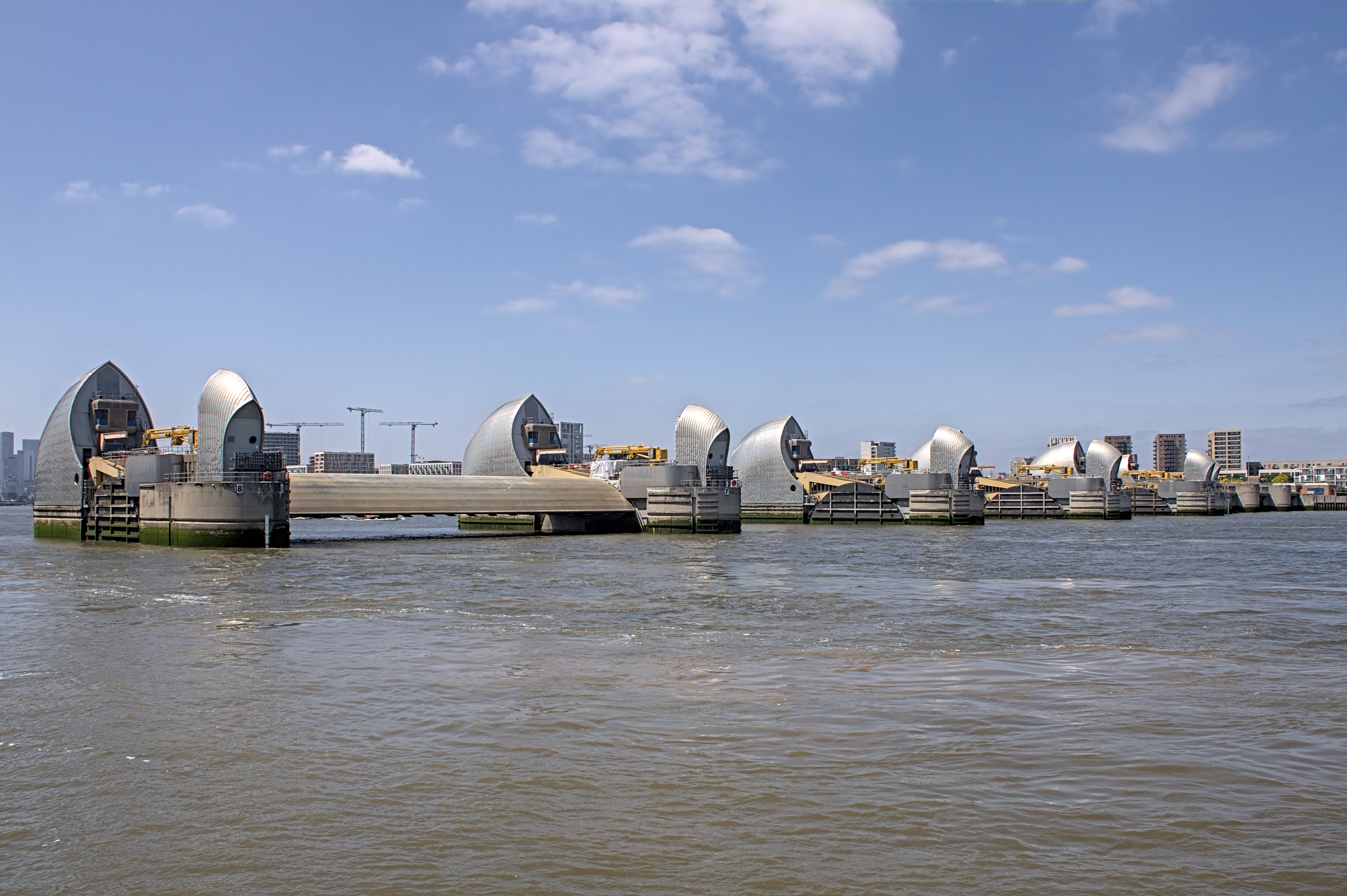
Flood barrier on the River Thames

London is protected from flooding by Thames Barrier, a huge mechanical barrier across the River Thames, which is raised when the water level reaches a certain point. This project has been operational since 1982 and was designed to protect against a surge of water such as the North Sea flood of 1953.

In 2023 it was found that over 4,000 flood defence schemes in England were 'almost useless' with many of them in areas hit by Storm Babet.

==== Russia ====
The Saint Petersburg Dam was completed in 2008 to protect Saint Petersburg from storm surges. It also has a main traffic function, as it completes a ring road around Saint Petersburg. Eleven dams extend for 25.4 kilometres (15.8 mi) and stand 8 metres (26 ft) above water level.

==== The Netherlands ====
The Netherlands has one of the best flood control systems in the world, notably through its construction of dykes. The country faces high flooding risk due to the country's low-lying landscapes. The largest and most elaborate flood defenses are referred to as the Delta Works with the Oosterscheldekering as its crowning achievement. These works in the southwestern part of the country were built in response to the North Sea flood of 1953. The Dutch had already built one of the world's largest dams in the north of the country. The Afsluitdijk closing occurred in 1932.

New ways to deal with water are constantly being developed and tested, such as the underground storage of water, storing water in reservoirs in large parking garages or on playgrounds. Rotterdam started a project to construct a floating housing development of 120 acres (0.49 km^{2}) to deal with rising sea levels. Several approaches, from high-tech sensors detecting imminent levee failure to movable semi-circular structures closing an entire river, are being developed or used around the world. Regular maintenance of hydraulic structures, however, is another crucial part of flood control.

Without dikes, the Netherlands would be flooded to this extent.

Flood control is an important issue for the Netherlands, as due to its low elevation, approximately two thirds of its area is vulnerable to flooding, while the country is densely populated. Natural sand dunes and constructed dikes, dams, and floodgates provide defense against storm surges from the sea. River dikes prevent flooding from water flowing into the country by the major rivers Rhine and Meuse, while a complicated system of drainage ditches, canals, and pumping stations (historically: windmills) keep the low-lying parts dry for habitation and agriculture. Water control boards are the independent local government bodies responsible for maintaining this system.

In modern times, flood disasters coupled with technological developments have led to large construction works to reduce the influence of the sea and prevent future floods. These have proved essential over the course of Dutch history, both geographically and militarily, and have greatly impacted the lives of many living in the cities affected, stimulating their economies through constant infrastructural improvement.

=== Oceania ===
Flooding is the greatest natural hazard in New Zealand, and its control is primarily managed and funded by local councils. Throughout the country there is a network of more than 5284 km of levees, while gravel extraction to lower river water levels is also a popular flood control technique. The management of flooding in the country is shifting towards nature based solutions, such as the widening of the Hutt River channel in Wellington.

== See also ==
- Bioswale – Landscape elements designed to manage surface runoff water
- Coastal management – Preventing flooding and erosion of shorelines
- Constructed wetland – Artificial wetland to treat wastewater, greywater or stormwater runoff
- Disaster risk reduction – Preventing and reducing disaster risk factors
- Flood Control Act of 1936 – 1936 United States act of Congress to control floods
- Flood risk assessment – Type of risk assessment with respect to floods
- Rain garden – Runoff reducing landscaping method
- Stormwater detention vault – Underground structure designed to manage excess stormwater runoff
- Stormwater harvesting – Collection of rainwater runoff
- Sustainable drainage system – Designed to reduce the potential impact of development
- Tidal barrage – Dam-like structure
- Tree box filter – Stormwater treatment system
- Water extraction – Process of taking water from any source
- Water-sensitive urban design – Integrated approach to urban water cycle
- Wetland – Ecosystem that is flooded or saturated with water
