= HydroSack =

Commercial flood control sandbag

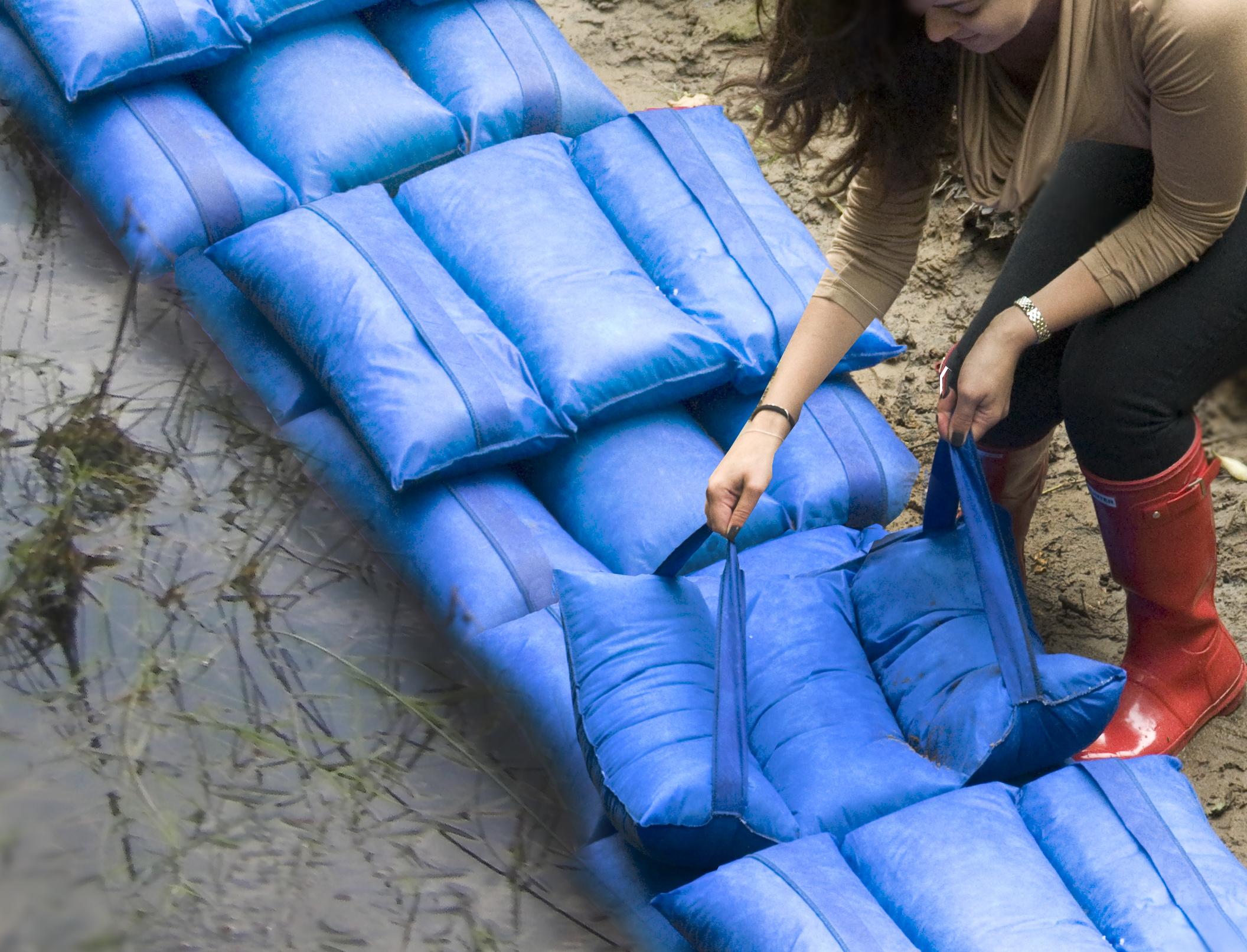
HydroSacks being placed along a river bank, 2011.

A HydroSack or a HydroSnake is a brand name for a flood control sandbag alternative made by Gravitas International of Cheshire, North West England. They are very lightweight and thin until they come into contact with water, then they begin to retain water until they have reached capacity. The devices then resist any further water excess. These can be used to absorb, resist and redirect flowing water.

== Design and use ==
The HydroSack and the HydroSnake are made up of an outer fabric consisting of non-woven polypropylene with a hydrophilic finish. The internal pads are composed of pads containing wood pulp and a superabsorbent polymer (SAP). In this form, the HydroSack or HydroSnake weighs 0.5 kilograms (1.1 lb). The HydroSack measures 60 by 48 centimetres (24 by 19 in) and the HydroSnake measures 20 by 120 centimetres (7.9 by 47.2 in). When a HydroSack or a HydroSnake comes into contact with water, the SAP crystallizes and absorbs the water. HydroSacks take approximately 2-3 minutes to reach full capacity. The HydroSack and the HydroSnake are very absorbent. Full capacity is between 15–20 litres (4.0–5.3 US gal) of water. It retains this weight for up to six months. HydroSacks can be stacked together to form a strong ballast. It is used as a form of flood control and can be used to minimize the damage that flooding can cause. The HydroSack has a three-section structure with handles. When a HydroSack is no longer needed, the insides can be emptied into the earth after use, without any harmful effects.

HydroSacks and HydroSnakes are new innovations to replace sandbags for their multiple purposes, from road ballast signs to flood protection. Globally, other companies are making products similar to the HydroSack, such as UK-based FloodSax which have sold more than 2.5 million of their alternative sandbags worldwide and Thailand based Nanotec. Fife council in the United Kingdom recently integrated the HydroSack into their first response flood protection. In June 2013, some residents of Rosyth criticized the distribution of HydroSacks for flood control, complaining that they were a single-use, disposable product. The Fife Council confirmed this, but added they would last for two or three months once filled with water.

== See also ==
- AquaFence
- Flood control
- Sandbag
