= AquaFence =

Reusable temporary flood barrier

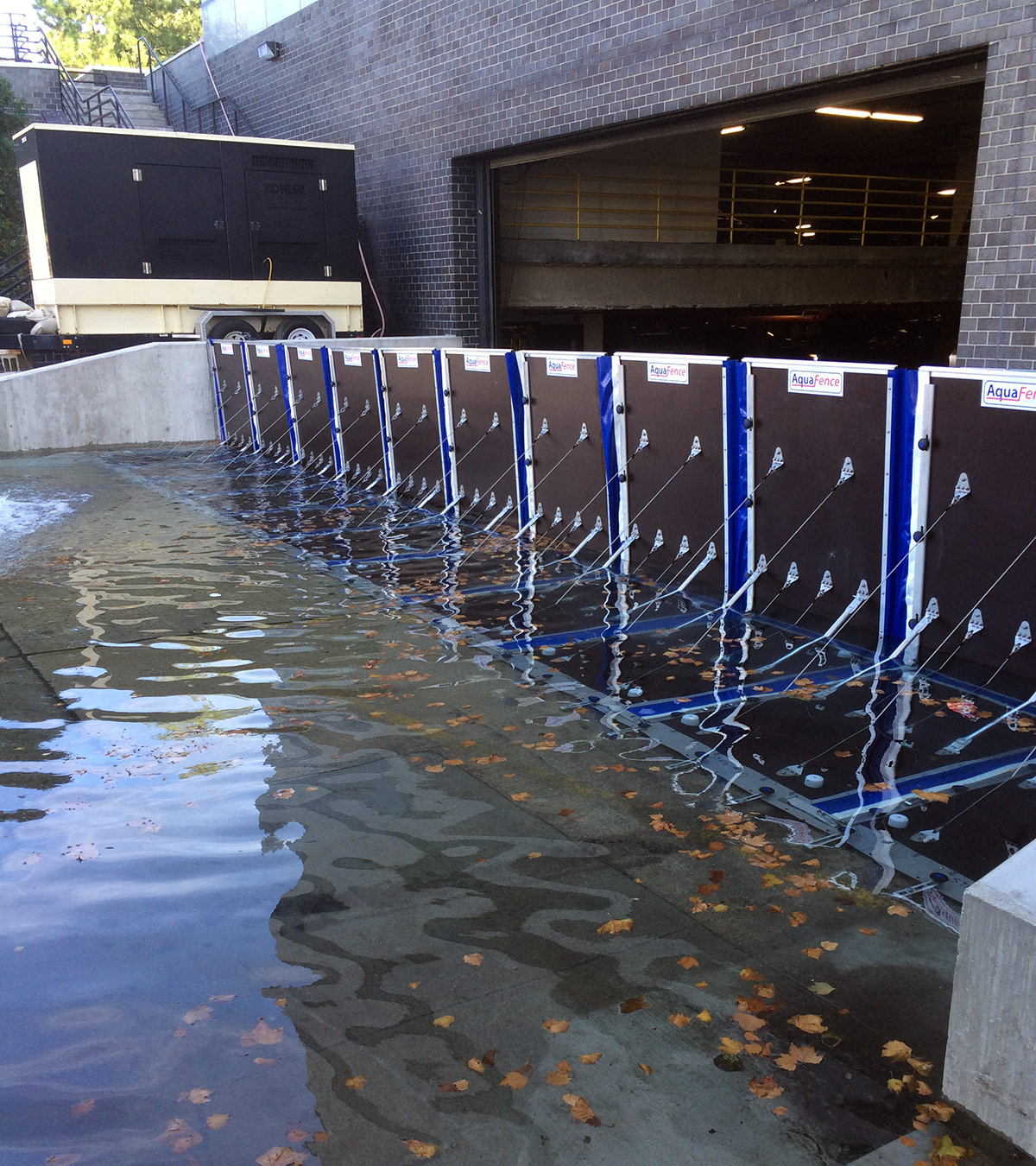
AquaFence deployed

AquaFence is a reusable temporary flood and hurricane barrier made by the Norwegian manufacturer AquaFence. It is an alternative to other temporary floodwater control such as sandbags and to the building of permanent seawalls.

== Design ==
The fencing consists of interlocking panels which are waterproof and puncture-resistant, can be bolted down to resist winds, and use the weight of floodwater to hold them in place. Materials include marine-grade laminate, stainless steel, aluminum and reinforced PVC canvas. The panels are reusable and can be stored flat between uses. The technology was designed as an alternative to building seawalls or placing sandbags in the path of floodwaters.

== Deployment ==
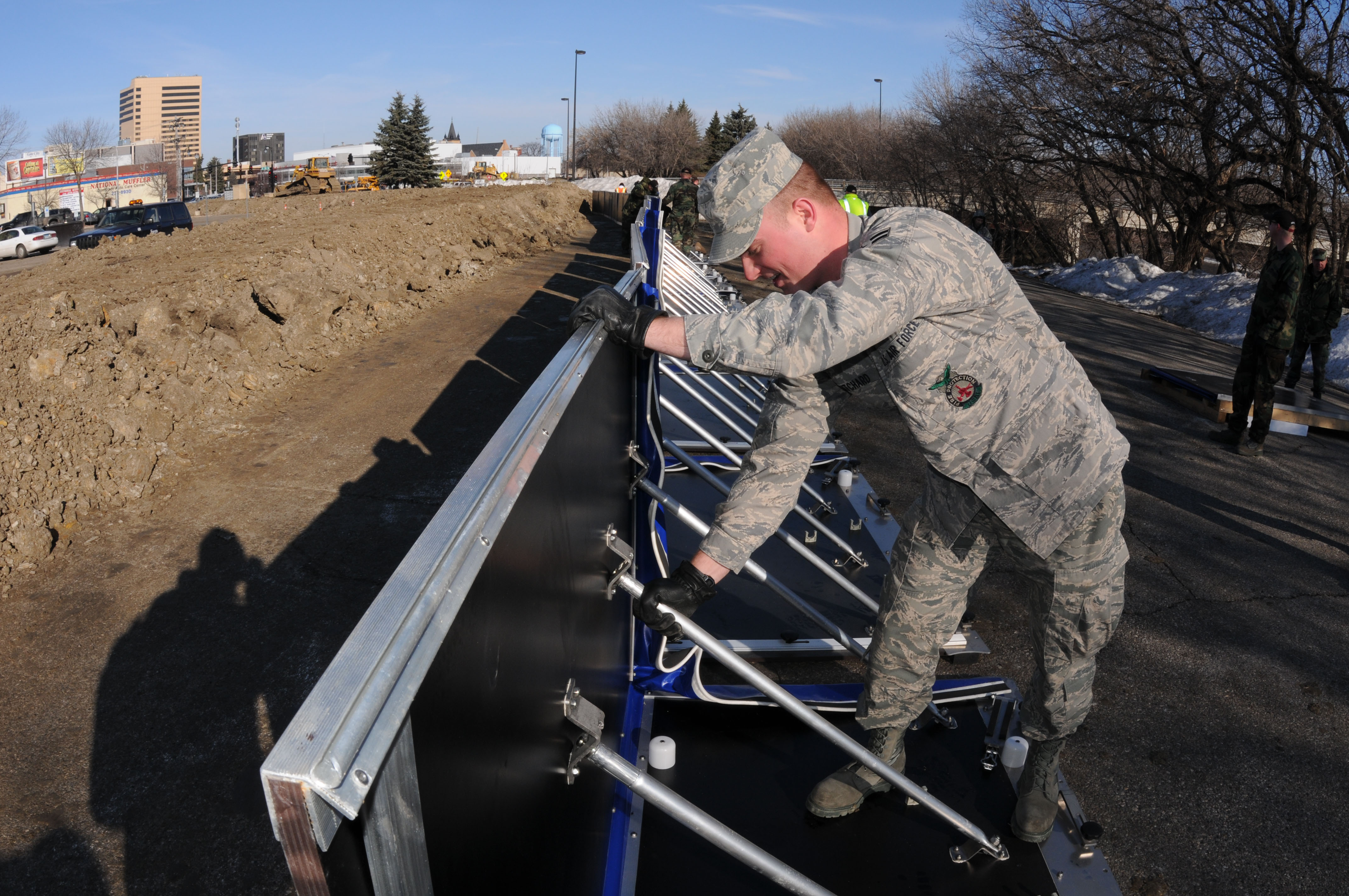
Deploying an AquaFence

An AquaFence was deployed at the Tees Barrage.

An AquaFence was deployed in Mount Vernon, Washington, in 2008.

Tampa, Florida's only Level I trauma center is at Tampa General Hospital, which sits directly on Tampa Bay at the northern end of the Davis Islands, which are one of the city's lowest-elevation areas. The hospital employs an AquaFence when a hurricane is forecast; erecting the fence requires 60 workers for three days. The fence the hospital uses can withstand storm surges of 15 feet (4.6 m) and wind speeds of 130 miles (210 km) per hour, which can handle a category 3 hurricane. The hospital used the fence for the first time during 2022's category 5 Hurricane Ian. During 2023's category 4 Hurricane Idalia, the fence blocked a storm surge of about two feet. It was also deployed during 2024's category 3 Hurricane Helene, successfully protecting the hospital. It was deployed for 2024's Hurricane Milton.

AquaFences have also been used to protect private properties such as luxury homes in flood-prone or hurricane-prone areas.

== Company ==
AquaFence was founded in 1999 and is headquartered in Oslo, Norway.

== See also ==
- HydroSack
