= Water-sensitive urban design =

Integrated approach to urban water cycle

Water-sensitive urban design (WSUD) is a land planning and engineering design approach which integrates the urban water cycle, including stormwater, groundwater, and wastewater management and water supply, into urban design to minimise environmental degradation and improve aesthetic and recreational appeal. WSUD is a term used in the Middle East and Australia and is similar to low-impact development (LID), a term used in the United States; and Sustainable Drainage System (SuDS), a term used in the United Kingdom.

Common approaches include reducing potable water use and collecting greywater, wastewater, stormwater, and other runoff for recycled use. Infrastructure design may be modified to enable water filtering, collection, and storage.

== Background ==
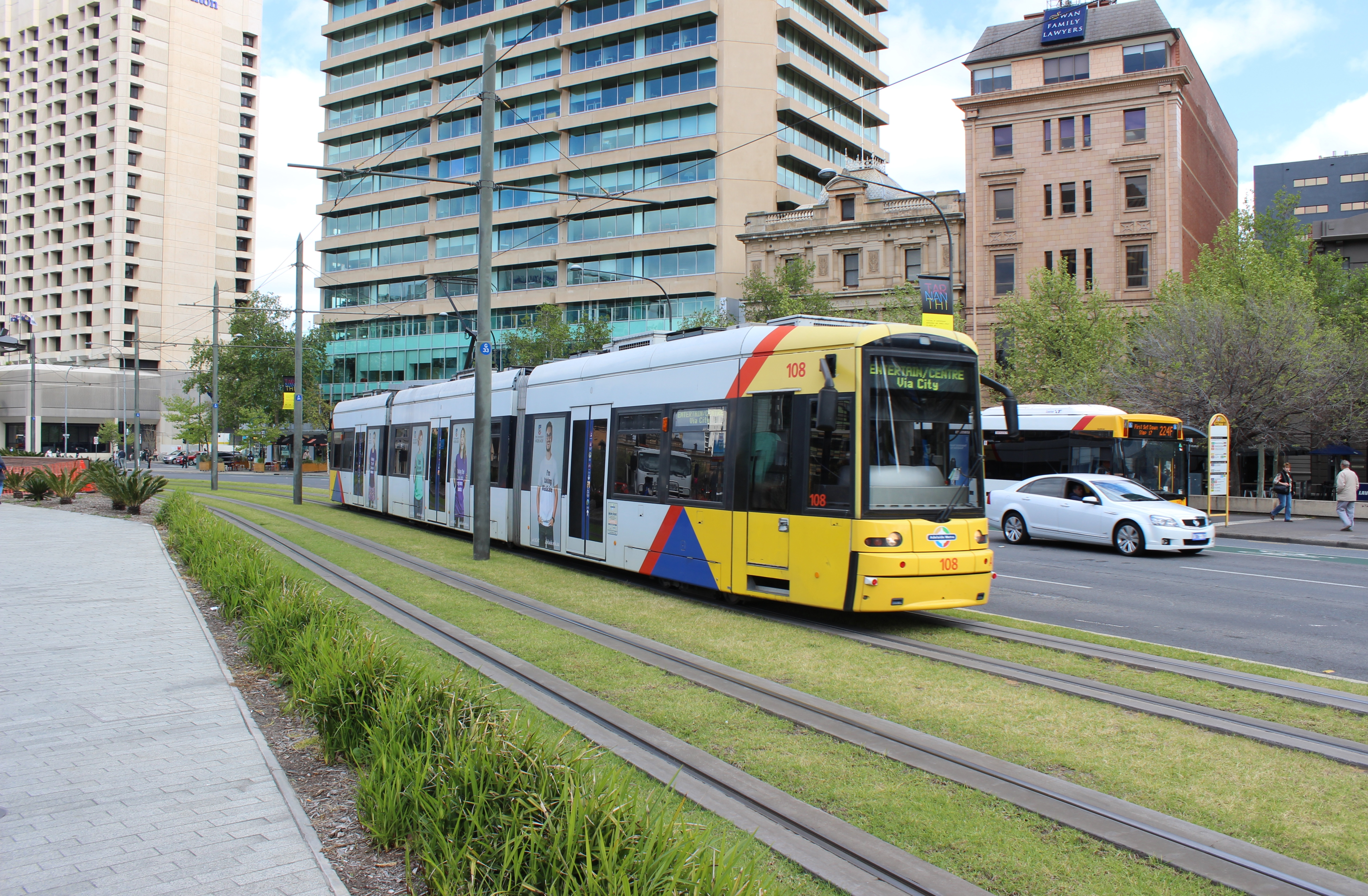
A tram running on green tracks in Adelaide, Australia. Replacing impermeable surfaces with grassy surfaces reduces stormwater runoff, among other environmental benefits.

Traditional urban and industrial development alters landscapes from permeable vegetated surfaces to a series of impervious interconnected surfaces resulting in large quantities of stormwater runoff, requiring management. Like other industrialized countries, including the United States and the United Kingdom, Australia has treated stormwater runoff as a liability and nuisance, endangering human health and property. This resulted in a strong focus on the design of stormwater management systems that rapidly convey stormwater runoff directly to streams with little or no focus on ecosystem preservation. This management approach results in what is referred to as urban stream syndrome. Heavy rainfall flows rapidly into streams carrying pollutants and sediments washed off from impervious surfaces, resulting in streams carrying elevated concentrations of pollutants, nutrients, and suspended solids. Increased peak flow also alters channel morphology and stability, further proliferating sedimentation and drastically reducing biotic richness.

Increased recognition of urban stream syndrome in the 1960s resulted in some movement toward holistic stormwater management in Australia. Awareness increased greatly during the 1990s with the Federal government and scientists cooperating through the Cooperative Research Centre program. Increasingly city planners have recognised the need for an integrated management approach to potable, waste, and stormwater management, to enable cities to adapt and become resilient to the pressure which population growth, urban densification and climate change places on ageing and increasingly expensive water infrastructure. Additionally, Australia's arid conditions mean it is particularly vulnerable to climate change, which together with its reliance on surface water sources, combined with one of the most severe droughts (from 2000–2010) since European settlement, highlight the fact that major urban centers face increasing water shortages. This has begun shifting the perception of stormwater runoff from strictly a liability and nuisance to that of having value as a water resource resulting in changing stormwater management practices. According to the United Nations Environment Programme, climate change is intensifying water-cycle disruptions—such as altered rainfall patterns and shrinking snowpack—which in turn increases the importance of integrative urban water-management strategies like water-sensitive urban design.

Australian states, building on the Federal government's foundational research in the 1990s, began releasing WSUD guidelines with Western Australia first releasing guidelines in 1994. Victoria released guidelines on the best practice environmental management of urban stormwater in 1999 (developed in consultation with New South Wales) and similar documents were released by Queensland through Brisbane City Council in 1999. Cooperation between Federal, State, and Territory governments to increase the efficiency of Australia's water use resulted in the National Water Initiative (NWI) signed in June 2004. The NWI is a comprehensive national strategy to improve water management across the country; it encompasses a wide range of water management issues and encourages the adoption of best practice approaches to the management of water in Australia, which include WSUD.

== Differences from conventional urban stormwater management ==
WSUD regards urban stormwater runoff as a resource rather than a nuisance or liability. This represents a paradigm shift in the way environmental resources and water infrastructure are dealt with in the planning and design of towns, and cities. WSUD principles regard all streams of water as a resource with diverse impacts on biodiversity, water, land, and the community's recreational and aesthetic enjoyment of waterways.

== Principles ==
- Protecting and enhancing creeks, rivers, and wetlands within urban environments
- Protecting and improving the water quality of water draining from urban environments into creeks, rivers, and wetlands
- Restoring the urban water balance by maximizing the reuse of stormwater, recycled water, and grey water
- Conserving water resources through reuse and system efficiency
- Integrating stormwater treatment into the landscape so that it offers multiple beneficial uses such as water quality treatment, wildlife habitat, recreation, and open public space
- Reducing peak flows and runoff from the urban environment simultaneously providing for infiltration and groundwater recharge
- Integrating water into the landscape to enhance the urban design as well as social, visual, cultural, and ecological values
- Easy, cost-effective implementation of WSUD allowing for widespread application.

== Objectives ==
- Reducing potable water demand through demand- and supply-side water management
- Incorporating the use of water-efficient appliances and fittings
- Adopting a fit-for-purpose approach to the use of potential alternative sources of water such as rainwater
- Minimising wastewater generation and the treatment of wastewater to a standard suitable for effluent reuse and/or release to receiving waters
- Treating stormwater to meet water quality objectives for reuse and/or discharge by capturing sediments, pollutants, and nutrients through the retention and slow release of stormwater
- Improving waterway health through restoring or preserving the natural hydrological regime of catchments through treatment and reuse technologies
- Improving the aesthetic and the connection with water for urban dwellers
- Promoting a significant degree of water-related self-sufficiency within urban settings by optimizing the use of water sources to minimise potable, storm, and waste water inflows and outflows through the incorporation into urban design of localised water storage
- Counteracting the 'urban heat island effect' through the use of water and vegetation, assisting in replenishing groundwater.

== Techniques ==
- The use of water-efficient appliances to reduce potable water use
- Greywater reuse as an alternate source of water to conserve potable supplies
- Stormwater harvesting, rather than rapid conveyance, of stormwater
- Reuse, storage, and infiltration of stormwater, instead of drainage system augmentation
- Use of vegetation for stormwater filtering purposes
- Water efficient landscaping to reduce potable water consumption
- Protection of water-related environmental, recreational, and cultural values by minimising the ecological footprint of a project associated with providing supply, wastewater, and stormwater services
- Localised wastewater treatment, and reuse systems to reduce potable water consumption, and minimise environmentally harmful wastewater discharges
- Provision of stormwater or other recycled urban waters (in all cases subject to appropriate controls) to provide environmental water requirements for modified watercourses
- Flexible institutional arrangements to cope with increased uncertainty and variability in climate
- A focus on longer-term planning including in related domains such as water demand management
- A diverse portfolio of water sources, supported by both centralised and decentralised water infrastructure.

== Common WSUD practices ==
Common WSUD practices used in Australia are discussed below. Usually, a combination of these elements are used to meet urban water cycle management objectives.

=== Road layout and streetscape ===
==== Bioretention systems ====
Bioretention systems involve the treatment of water by vegetation prior to filtration of sediment and other solids through prescribed media. Vegetation provides biological uptake of nitrogen, phosphorus, and other soluble or fine particulate contaminants. Bioretention systems offer a smaller footprint than other similar measures (e.g. constructed wetlands) and are commonly used to filter and treat runoff prior to it reaching street drains. Use on larger scales can be complicated and hence other devices may be more appropriate. Bioretention systems comprise bioretention swales (also referred to as grassed swales and drainage channels) and bioretention basins.

===== Bioretention swales =====
Bioretention swales, similar to buffer strips and swales, are placed within the base of a swale that is generally located in the median strip of divided roads. They provide both stormwater treatment and are. A bioretention system can be installed in part of a swale, or along the full length of a swale, depending on treatment requirements. The runoff water usually goes through a fine media filter and proceeds downward where it is collected via a perforated pipe leading to downstream waterways or storages. Vegetation growing in the filter media can prevent erosion and, unlike infiltration systems, bioretention swales are suited for a wide range of soil conditions.

===== Bioretention basins =====
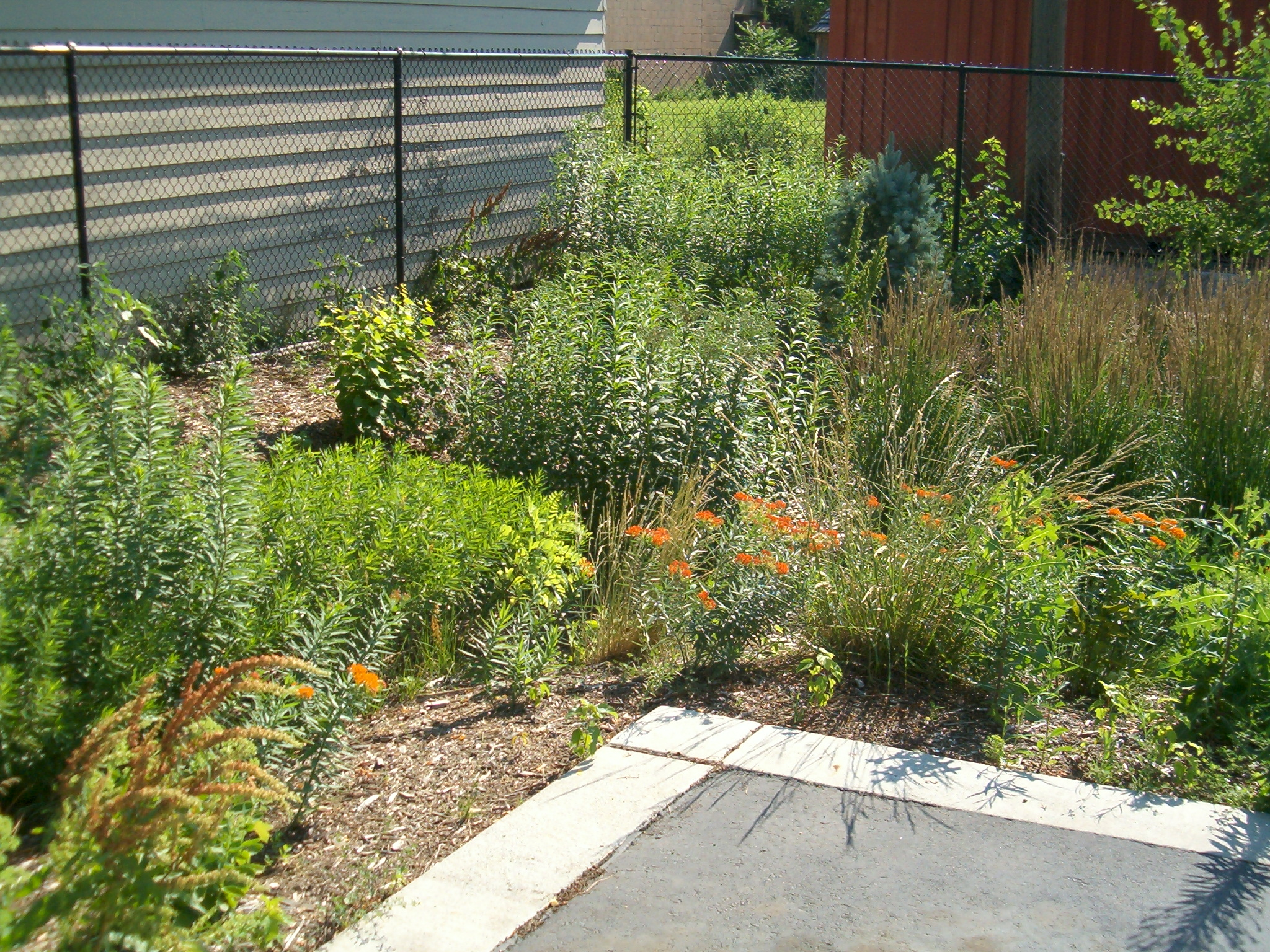
Parking lot that drains to a small bioretention basin.

Bioretention basins provide similar flow control and water quality treatment functions to bioretention swales but do not have a conveyance function. In addition to the filtration and biological uptake functions of bioretention systems, basins also provide extended detention of stormwater to maximise runoff treatment during small to medium flow events. The term raingarden is also used to describe such systems but usually refers to smaller, individual lot-scale bioretention basins. Bioretention basins have the advantage of being applicable at a range of scales and shapes and therefore have flexibility in their location within developments. Like other bioretention systems, they are often located along streets at regular intervals to treat runoff prior to entry into the drainage system. Alternatively, larger basins can provide treatment for larger areas, such as at the outfalls of a drainage system. A wide range of vegetation can be used within a bioretention basin, allowing them to be well integrated into the surrounding landscape design. Vegetation species that tolerate periodic inundation should be selected. Bioretention basins are however, sensitive to any materials that may clog the filter media. Basins are often used in conjunction with gross pollutant traps (GPTs or litter traps, include widely used trash racks), and coarser sediment basins, which capture litter and other gross solids to reduce the potential for damage to the vegetation or filter media surface.

==== Infiltration trenches and systems ====
Infiltration trenches are shallow excavated structures filled with permeable materials such as gravel or rock to create an underground reservoir. They are designed to hold stormwater runoff within a subsurface trench and gradually release it into the surrounding soil and groundwater systems. Although they are generally not designed as a treatment measure but can provide some level of treatment by retaining pollutants and sediments. Runoff volumes and peak discharges from impervious areas are reduced by capturing and infiltrating flows.

Due to their primary function of being the discharge of treated stormwater, infiltration systems are generally positioned as the final element in a WSUD system. Infiltration trenches should not be located on steep slopes or unstable areas. A layer of geotextile fabric is often used to line the trench in order to prevent the soil from migrating into the rock or gravel fill. Infiltration systems are dependent on the local soil characteristics and are generally best suited to soils with good infiltrative capacity, such as sandy-loam soils, with deep groundwater. In areas of low permeability soils, such as clay, a perforated pipe may be placed within the gravel.

Regular maintenance is crucial to ensure that the system does not clog with sediments and that the desired infiltration rate is maintained. This includes checking and maintaining the pre-treatment by periodic inspections and cleaning of clogged material.

==== Sand Filters ====
Sand filters are a variation of the infiltration trench principle and operate in a way similar to bioretention systems. Stormwater is passed through them for treatment prior to discharge to the downstream stormwater system. Sand filters are very useful in treating runoff from confined hard surfaces such as car parks and from heavily urbanised and built-up areas. They usually do not support vegetation owing to the filtration media (sand) not retaining sufficient moisture and because they are usually installed underground. The filter usually consists of a sedimentation chamber as pre-treatment device to remove litter, debris, gross pollutants, and medium-sized sediments; a weir; followed by a sand layer that filters sediments, finer particulates, and dissolved pollutants. The filtered water is collected by perforated underdrain pipes in a similar manner as in bioretention systems. Systems may also have an overflow chamber. The sedimentation chamber can have permanent water or can be designed to be drained with weep holes between storm events. Permanent water storage however, can risk anaerobic conditions that can lead to the release of pollutants (e.g. phosphorus). The design process should consider the provision of detention storage to yield a high hydrologic effectiveness, and discharge control by proper sizing of the perforated underdrain and overflow path. Regular maintenance is required to prevent crust forming.

==== Porous paving ====
Porous paving (or pervious paving) is an alternative to conventional impermeable pavement and allows infiltration of runoff water to the soil or to a dedicated water storage reservoir below it In reasonably flat areas such as car parks, driveways, and lightly used roads, it decreases the volume and velocity of stormwater runoff and can improve water quality by removing contaminants through filtering, interception, and biological treatment. Porous pavements can have several forms and are either monolithic or modular. Monolithic structures consist of a single continuous porous medium such as porous concrete or porous pavement (asphalt) while modular structures include porous pavers individual paving blocks that are constructed so that there is a gap in between each paver. Commercial products that are available are for example, pavements made from special asphalt or concrete containing minimal materials, concrete grid pavements, and concrete ceramic or plastic modular pavements. Porous pavements are usually laid on a very porous material (sand or gravel), underlain by a layer of geotextile material. Maintenance activities vary depending on the type of porous pavement. Generally, inspections and removal of sediment and debris should be undertaken. Modulate pavers can also be lifted, backwashed, and replaced when blockages occurs. Generally porous pavement is not suited for areas with heavy traffic loads. Particulates in stormwater can clog pores in the material.

=== Public open space ===
==== Sedimentation basins ====
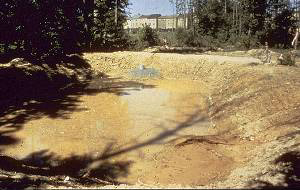
Sediment basin installed on a construction site.

Sedimentation basins (otherwise known as sediment basins) are used to remove (by settling) coarse to medium-sized sediments and to regulate water flows and are often the first element in a WSUD treatment system. They operate through temporary stormwater retention and reduction of flow velocities to promote settling of sediments out of the water column. They are important as a pretreatment to ensure downstream elements are not overloaded or smothered with coarse sediments. Sedimentation basins can take various forms and can be used as permanent systems integrated into an urban design or temporary measures to control sediment discharge during construction activities. They are often designed as an inlet pond to a bioretention basin or constructed wetland. Sedimentation basins are generally most effective at removing coarser sediments (125 μm and larger) and are typically designed to remove 70 to 90% of such sediments. They can be designed to drain during periods without rainfall and then fill during runoff events or to have a permanent pool. In flow events greater than their designed discharge, a secondary spillway directs water to a bypass channel or conveyance system, preventing the resuspension of sediments previously trapped in the basin.

==== Constructed wetlands ====
Constructed wetlands are designed to remove stormwater pollutants associated with fine to colloidal particles and dissolved contaminants. These shallow, extensively vegetated water bodies use enhanced sedimentation, fine filtration, and biological uptake to remove these pollutants. They usually comprise three zones: an inlet zone (sedimentation basin) to remove coarse sediments; a macrophyte zone, a heavily vegetated area to remove fine particulates and uptake of soluble pollutants; and a high flow bypass channel to protect the macrophyte zone. The macrophyte zone generally includes a marsh zone as well as an open water zone and has an extended depth of 0.25 to 0.5m with specialist plant species and a retention time of 48 to 72 hours. Constructed Wetlands can also provide a flow control function by rising during rainfall and then slowly releasing the stored flows. Constructed wetlands will improve the runoff water quality depending on the wetland processes. The key treatment mechanism of wetlands are physical (trapping suspended solids and adsorbed pollutants), biological and chemical uptake (trapping dissolved pollutants, chemical adsorption of pollutants), and pollutant transformation (more stable sediment fixation, microbial processes, UV disinfection).

The design of constructed wetlands requires careful consideration to avoid common problems such as accumulation of litter, oil, and scum in sections of the wetland, infestation of weeds, mosquito problems or algal blooms. Constructed wetlands can require a large amount of land area and are unsuitable for steep terrain. High costs of the area and of vegetation establishment can be deterrents to the use of constructed wetlands as a WSUD measure. Guidelines for developers (such as the Urban Stormwater: Best Practice Environmental Management Guidelines in Victoria) require the design to retain particles of 125μm and smaller with very high efficiency and to reduce typical pollutants (such as phosphorus and nitrogen) by at least 45%. In addition to stormwater treatment, the design criteria for constructed wetlands also include enhanced aesthetic and recreational values, and habitat provision. The maintenance of constructed wetlands usually includes the removal of sediments and litter from the inlet zone, as well as weed control and occasional macrophyte harvesting to maintain a vigorous vegetation cover.

==== Swales and buffer strips ====
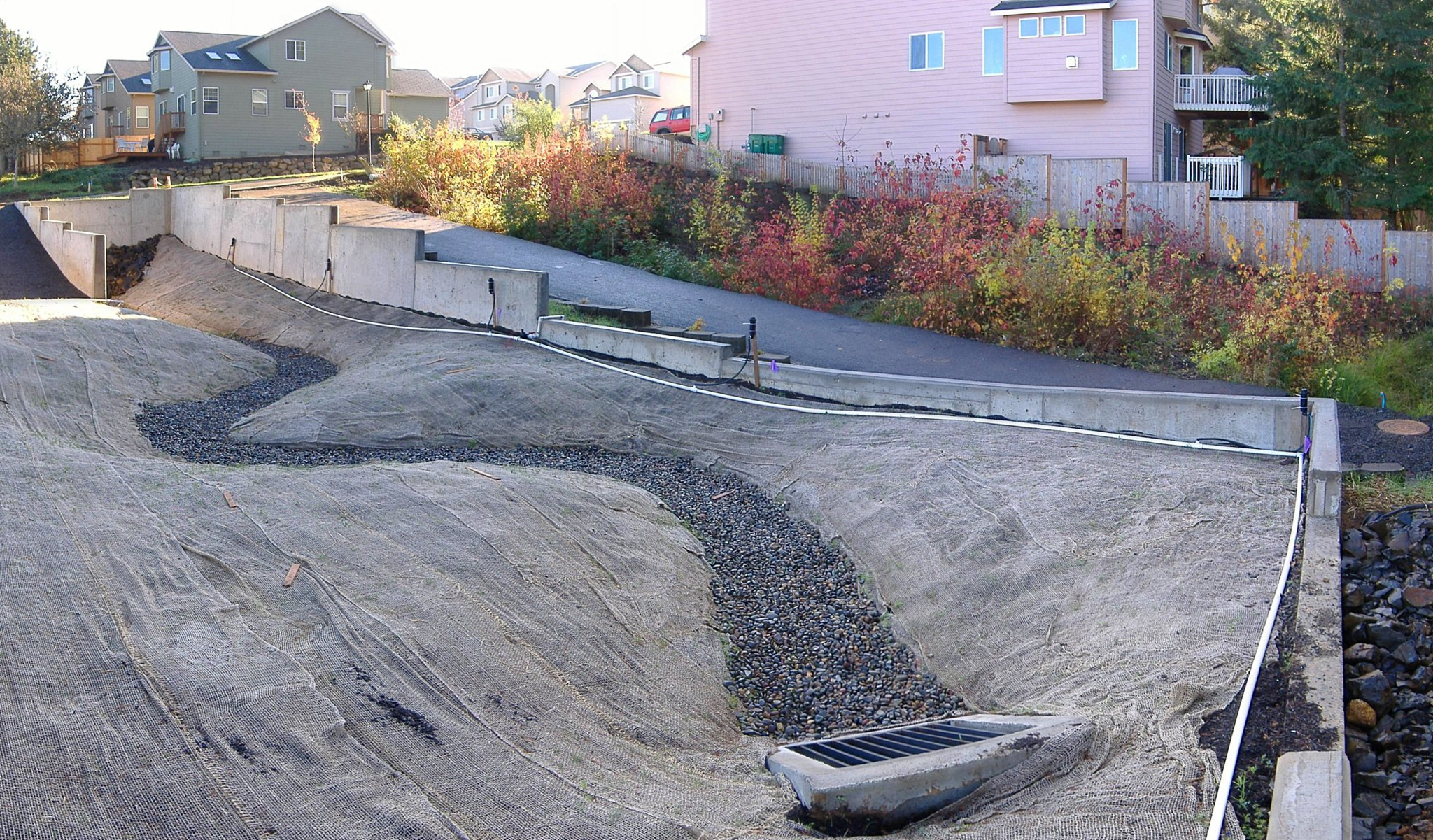
Two swales for a housing development. The foreground one is under construction while the background one is established.

Swales and buffer strips are used to convey stormwater in lieu of pipes and provide a buffer strip between receiving waters (e.g. creek or wetland) and impervious areas of a catchment. Overland flows and mild slopes slowly convey water downstream and promote an even distribution of flow. Buffer areas provide treatment through sedimentation and interaction with vegetation.

Swales can be incorporated in urban designs along streets or parklands and add to the aesthetic character of an area. Typical swales are created with longitudinal slopes between 1% and 4% in order to maintain flow capacity without creating high velocities, potential erosion of the bioretention or swale surface and safety hazard. In steeper areas check banks along swales or dense vegetation can help to distribute flows evenly across swales and slow velocities. Milder-sloped swales may have issues with water-logging and stagnant ponding, in which case underdrains can be employed to alleviate problems. If the swale is to be vegetated, vegetation must be capable of withstanding design flows and be of sufficient density to provide good filtration). Ideally, vegetation height should be above treatment flow water levels. If runoff enters directly into a swale, perpendicular to the main flow direction, the edge of the swale acts as a buffer and provides pre-treatment for the water entering the swale.

==== Ponds and lakes ====
Ponds and lakes are artificial bodies of open water that are usually created by constructing a dam wall with a weir outlet structure. Similar to constructed wetlands, they can be used to treat runoff by providing extended detention and allowing sedimentation, absorption of nutrients, and UV disinfection to occur. In addition, they provide an aesthetic quality for recreation, wildlife habitat, and valuable storage of water that can potentially be reused for e.g. irrigation. Often, artificial ponds and lakes also form part of a flood detention system. Aquatic vegetation plays an important role for the water quality in artificial lakes and ponds in respect of maintaining and regulating the oxygen and nutrient levels. Due to a water depth greater than 1.5m, emergent macrophytes are usually restricted to the margins but submerged plants may occur in the open water zone. Fringing vegetation can be useful in reducing bank erosion. Ponds are normally not used as stand-alone WSUD measure but are often combined with sediment basins or constructed wetlands as pretreatments.

In many cases, however, lakes and ponds have been designed as aesthetic features but suffer from poor health which can be caused by lack of appropriate inflows sustaining lake water levels, the poor water quality of inflows and high organic carbon loads, infrequent flushing of the lake (too long residence time), and/or inappropriate mixing (stratification) leading to low levels of dissolved oxygen. Bluegreen algae caused by poor water quality and high nutrient levels can be a major threat to the health of lakes. To ensure the long-term sustainability of lakes and ponds, key issues that should be considered in their design include catchment hydrology and water level, and layout of the pond/lake (oriented to dominant winds to facilitate mixing. Hydraulic structures (inlet and outlet zones) should be designed to ensure adequate pre-treatment and prevent large nutrient 'spikes' Landscape design, using appropriate plant species and planting density are also necessary. High costs of the planned pond/lake area and of vegetation establishment as well as frequent maintenance requirements can be deterrents to use of ponds and lakes as WSUD measures.

The maintenance of pond and lake systems is important to minimize the risk of poor health. The inlet zone usually requires weed, plant, debris, and litter removal with occasional replanting. In some cases, an artificial turn over of the lake might be necessary.

=== Water re-use ===
==== Rainwater tanks ====
Rainwater tanks (see also Rainwater Harvesting) are designed to conserve potable water by harvesting rain and stormwater to partially meet domestic water demands (e.g. during drought periods). In addition, rainwater tanks can reduce stormwater runoff volumes and stormwater pollutants from reaching downstream waterways. They can be used effectively in domestic households as a potential WSUD element. Rain and stormwater from rooftops of buildings can be collected and accessed specifically for purposes such as toilet flushing, laundry, garden watering, and car washing. Buffer Tanks allow rain water collected from hard surfaces to seep into the site helps maintain the aquifer and ground water levels.

In Australia, there are no quantitative performance targets for rainwater tanks, such as size of tank or targeted reductions in potable water demand, in policies or guidelines. The various guidelines provided by state governments however, do advise that rain water tanks be designed to provide a reliable source of water to supplement mains water supply, and maintain appropriate water quality. The use of rainwater tanks should consider issues such as supply and demand, water quality, stormwater benefits (volume is reduced), cost, available space, maintenance, size, shape, and material of the tank. Rainwater tanks must also be installed in accordance with plumbing and drainage standards. An advised suitable configuration may include a water filter or first flush diversion, a mains water top-up supply (dual supply system), maintenance drain, a pump (pressure system), and an on-site retention provision.

Potential water quality issues include atmospheric pollution, bird, and possum droppings, insects e.g. mosquito larvae, roofing material, paints, and detergents. As part of maintenance, an annual flush out (to remove built-up sludge and debris) and regular visual inspections should be carried out.

==== Aquifer storage and recovery (ASR) ====
Aquifer storage and recovery (ASR) (also referred to as Managed Aquifer Recharge) aims to enhance water recharge to underground aquifers through gravity feed or pumping. It can be an alternative to large surface storages with water being pumped up again from below the surface in dry periods. Potential water sources for an ASR system can be stormwater or treated wastewater. The following components can usually be found in an ASR system that harvests stormwater :

1. A diversion structure for a stream or drain
2. A treatment system for storm water prior to injection as well as for recovered water
3. A wetland, detention pond, dam or tank, as a temporary storage measure
4. A spill or overflow structure
5. A well for the water injection and a well for the recovery of the water
6. Systems (including sampling ports) to monitor water levels and water quality.

The possible aquifer types suitable for an ASR system include fractured unconfined rock and confined sand and gravel. Detailed geological investigations are necessary to establish the feasibility of an ASR scheme. The potential low cost of ASR compared to subsurface storage can be attractive. The design process should consider the protection of groundwater quality, and recovered water quality for its intended use. Aquifers and aquitards need also be protected from damaged by depletion or high pressures. Impacts of the harvesting point on downstream areas also require consideration. Careful planning is required regarding aquifer selection, treatment, injection, the recovery process, and maintenance and monitoring.

== Policy, planning, and legislation ==
In Australia, due to the constitutional division of power between the Australian Commonwealth and the States, there is no national legislative requirement for urban water cycle management. The National Water Initiative (NWI), agreed upon by Federal, State, and Territory governments in 2004 and 2006, provides a national plan to improve water management across the country. It provides clear intent to "Create Water Sensitive Australian Cities" and encourages the adoption of WSUD approaches. National guidelines have also been released in accordance with NWI clause 92(ii) to provide guidance on the evaluation of WSUD initiatives.

At the state level, planning and environmental legislation broadly promotes ecologically sustainable development, but to varying degrees have only limited requirements for WSUD. State planning policies variously provide more specific standards for adoption of WSUD practices in particular circumstances.

At the local government level, regional water resource management strategies supported by regional and/or local catchment-scale integrated water cycle management plans and/or stormwater management plans provide the strategic context for WSUD. Local government environment plans may place regulatory requirements on developments to implement WSUD.

As regulatory authority over stormwater runoff is shared between Australian states and local government areas, issues of multiple governing jurisdictions have resulted in inconsistent implementation of WSUD policies and practices and fragmented management of larger watersheds. For example, in Melbourne, jurisdictional authority for watersheds of greater than 60 ha rests with the state-level authority, Melbourne Water; while local governments govern smaller watersheds. Consequently, Melbourne Water has been deterred from investing significantly in WSUD works to improve small watersheds, despite them affecting the condition of the larger watersheds into which they drain and waterway health including headwater streams.

=== State legislation and policy ===
==== Victoria ====
In Victoria, elements of WSUD are integrated into many of the overall objectives and strategies of the Victorian planning policy. The State Planning Policy Framework of the [Victoria Planning Provisions] which is contained in all planning schemes in Victoria contains some specific clauses requiring adoption of WSUD practices.

New residential developments are subject to a permeability standard that at least 20 percent of sites should not be covered by impervious surfaces. The objective of this is to reduce the impact of increased stormwater runoff on the drainage system and facilitate on-site stormwater infiltration.

New residential subdivisions of two or more lots are required to meet integrated water management objectives related to:

- drinking water supply;
- reused and recycled water;
- waste water management, and
- urban run-off management.

Specifically regarding urban runoff management, the "Victoria Planning Provisions" c. 56.07-4 Clause 25 states that stormwater systems must meet best practice stormwater management objectives. Currently, while no longer considered best practice, the state standard is Urban Stormwater: Best Practice Environmental Management Guidelines. The current water quality objectives, which do not protect waterways from the impacts of stormwater are:

- 80 percent retention of typical urban annual suspended solids load
- 45 percent retention of typical urban annual total phosphorus load
- 45 percent retention of typical urban annual total nitrogen load
- 70 percent reduction of typical urban annual litter load.

Urban stormwater management systems must also meet the requirements of the relevant drainage authority. This is usually the local council. However, in the Melbourne region, where a catchment greater than 60ha is concerned it is Melbourne Water. Inflows downstream of the subdivision site are also restricted to pre-development levels unless approved by the relevant drainage authority and there are no detrimental downstream impacts.

Melbourne Water provides a simplified online software tool, STORM (Stormwater Treatment Objective – Relative Measure), to allow users to assess if development proposals meet legislated best practice stormwater quality performance objectives. The STORM tool is limited to assessment of discrete WSUD treatment practices and so does not model where several treatment practices are used in series. Of It is also limited to sites where coverage of impervious surfaces is greater than 40%. For larger more complicated developments more sophisticated modelling, such as MUSIC software, is recommended.

==== New South Wales ====
At the state level in New South Wales, the / State Environmental Planning Policy (Building Sustainability Index: BASIX) 2004 (NSW ) is the primary piece of policy mandating adoption of WSUD. BASIX is an online program that allows users to enter data relating to a residential development, such as location, size, building materials etc.; to receive scores against water and energy use reduction targets. Water targets range from a 0 to 40% reduction in consumption of mains-supplied potable water (see also water demand management), depending on location of the residential development. Ninety percent of new homes are covered by the 40% water target. The BASIX program allows for the modelling of some WSUD elements such as use of rainwater tanks, stormwater tanks and greywater recycling.

Local Councils are responsible for the development of Local Environment Plans (LEPs) which can control development and mandate adoption of WSUD practices and targets / Local Government Act 1993 (NSW ). Due to a lack of consistent policy and direction at the state-level however, adoption by local councils is mixed with some developing their own WSUD objectives in their local environmental plans (LEP) and others having no such provisions.

In 2006 the then NSW Department of Environment and Conservation released a guidance document, Managing Urban Stormwater: Harvesting and Reuse. The document presented an overview of stormwater harvesting and provided guidance on planning and design aspects of integrated landscape-scale strategy as well as technical WSUD practice implementation. The document now however, although still available on the governmental website, does not appear to be widely promoted.

The Sydney Metropolitan Catchment Management Authority also provides tools and resources to support local council adoption of WSUD. These include

- Potential WSUD provisions for incorporation into Local Government LEPs, with State-level department approval in NSW;
- Potential WSUD clauses for incorporation into Local Government reports, tenders, expressions of interest or other materials.;
- A WSUD Decision Support Tool to guide councils in comparing and evaluating on-ground WSUD projects, and
- Draft guidelines for the use of the more sophisticated MUSIC modelling software in NSW

== Predictive modelling to assess WSUD performance ==
Simplified modelling programs are provided by some jurisdictions to assess implementation of WSUD practices in compliance with local regulations. STORM is provided by Melbourne Water and BASIX is used in NSW, Australia for residential developments. For large, more complicated developments, more sophisticated modelling software may be necessary.

== Issues affecting decision-making in WSUD ==
=== Impediments to the adoption of WSUD ===
Major issues affecting the adoption of WSUD include:

- Regulatory framework barriers and institutional fragmentation at state and local government levels
- Assessment and costing "uncertainties relating to selecting and optimising WSUD practices for quantity and quality control
- Technology and design and complexity integrating into landscape-scale water management systems
- Marketing and acceptance and related uncertainties

The transition of Melbourne city to WSUD over the last forty years has culminated in a list of best practice qualities and enabling factors, which have been identified as important in aiding decision making to facilitate transition to WSUD technologies. The implementation of WSUD can be enabled through the effective interplay between the two variables discussed below.

==== Qualities of decision-makers ====
- Vision for waterway health – A common vision for waterway health through cooperative approaches
- Multi-sectoral network – A network of champions interacting between government, academia, and private sector
- Environmental values – Strong environmental protection values
- Public-good disposition – Advocacy and protection of the public good
- Best-practice ideology – Pragmatic approach to aid cross-sectoral implementation of best practices
- Learning-by-doing philosophy – Adaptive approach to incorporating new scientific information
- Opportunistic – Strategic and forward thinking approach to advocacy and practice
- Innovative and adaptive – Challenge status quo through focus on adaptive management philosophy.

==== Key factors for enabling WSUD ====
- Socio-political capital – An aligned community, media, and political concern for improved waterway health, amenity, and recreation
- Bridging organization – Dedicated organizing entity that facilitates collaboration between science and policy, agencies and professions, and knowledge brokers and industry
- Trusted and reliable science – Accessible scientific expertise, innovating reliable and effective solutions to local problems
- Binding targets – A measurable and effective target that binds the change activity of scientists, policy makers, and developers
- Accountability – A formal organizational responsibility for the improvement of waterway health, and a cultural commitment to proactively influence practices that lead to such an outcome
- Strategic funding – Additional resources, including external funding injection points, directed to the change effort
- Demonstration projects and training – Accessible and reliable demonstration of new thinking and technologies in practice, accompanied by knowledge diffusion initiatives
- Market receptivity – A well-articulated business case for the change activity.

== WSUD projects in Australia ==
WSUD technologies can be implemented in a range of projects, from previously pristine and undeveloped, or greenfield sites, to developed or polluted brownfield sites that require alteration or remediation. In Australia, WSUD technologies have been implemented in a broad range of projects, including from small-scale road-side projects, up to large-scale +100 hectare residential development sites. The three key case studies below represent a range of WSUD projects from around Australia.

=== A raingarden biofilter for small-scale stormwater management ===
==== Ku-ring-gai Council's Kooloona Crescent Raingarden, NSW ====
The WSUD Roadway Retrofit Bioretention System is a small-scale project implemented by the Ku-ring-gai Council in NSW as part of an overall catchment incentive to reduce stormwater pollution. The Raingarden uses a bioretention system to capture and treat an estimated 75 kg of total suspended solids (TSS) per year of local stormwater runoff from the road, and filters it through a sand filter media before releasing it back into the stormwater system. Permeable pavers are also used in the system within the surrounding pedestrian footpaths, to support the infiltration of runoff into the ground water system. Roadside bioretention systems similar to this project have been implemented throughout Australia. Similar projects are presented on the Sydney Catchment Management Authority's WSUD website:

- 2005 Ku-ring-gai Council – Minnamurra Avenue Water Sensitive Road project;
- 2003 City of Yarra, Victoria – Roadway reconstruction with inclusion of bioretention basins to treat stormwater;
- 2003-4 City of Kingston, Victoria (Chelsea) – Roadway reconstruction with inclusion of bioretention basins to treat stormwater, and
- 2004 City of Kingston, Victoria (Mentone) – Roadway reconstruction with inclusion of bioretention basins to treat stormwater.

=== WSUD in residential development projects ===
==== Lynbrook Estate, Victoria ====
The Lynbrook Estate development project in Victoria, demonstrates effective implementation of WSUD by the private sector. It is a Greenfield residential development site that has focused its marketing for potential residents on innovative use of stormwater management technologies, following a pilot study by Melbourne Water.

The project combines conventional drainage systems with WSUD measures at the streetscape and sub-catchment level, with the aim of attenuating and treating stormwater flows to protect receiving waters within the development. Primary treatment of the stormwater is carried out by grass swales and an underground gravel trench system, which collects, infiltrates, and conveys road/roof runoff. The main boulevard acts as a bioretention system with an underground gravel-filled trench to allow for infiltration and conveyance of stormwater. The catchment runoff then undergoes secondary treatment through a wetland system before discharge into an ornamental lake. This project is significant as the first residential WSUD development of this scale in Australia. Its performance in exceeding the Urban Stormwater Best Practice Management Guidelines for Total Nitrogen, Total Phosphorus and Total Suspended Solids levels, has won it both the 2000 President's Award in the Urban Development Institute of Australia Awards for Excellence (recognising innovation in urban development), and the 2001 Cooperative Research Centres' Association Technology Transfer Award. Its success as a private-sector implemented WSUD system led to its proponent Urban and Regional Land Corporation (URLC) to look to incorporate WSUD as a standard practice across the State of Victoria. The project has also attracted attention from developers, councils, waterway management agencies and environmental policy-makers throughout the country.

=== Large-scale remediation for the Sydney 2000 Olympic Games ===
==== Homebush Bay, NSW ====
For the establishment of the Sydney 2000 Olympic Games site, the Brownfield area of Homebush Bay was remediated from an area of landfill, abattoirs, and a navy armament depot into a multiuse Olympic site. A Water Reclamation and Management Scheme (WRAMS) was set up in 2000 for large-scale recycling of non-potable water, which included a range of WSUD technologies. These technologies were implemented with a particular focus on addressing the objectives of protecting receiving waters from stormwater and wastewater discharges; minimising potable water demand; and protecting and enhancing habitat for threatened species 2006. The focus of WSUD technologies was directed toward the on-site treatment, storage, and recycling of stormwater and wastewater. Stormwater runoff is treated using gross pollutant traps, swales and/or wetland systems. This has contributed to a reduction of 90% in nutrient loads in the Haslams Creek wetland remediation area. Wastewater is treated in a water reclamation plant. Almost 100% of sewage is treated and recycled. The treated water from both stormwater and wastewater sources is stored and recycled for use throughout the Olympic site in water features, irrigation, toilet flushing, and fire fighting capacities. Through the use of WSUD technology, the WRAMS scheme has resulted in the conservation of 850 million litres (ML) of water annually, a potential 50% reduction in annual potable water consumption within the Olympic site, as well as the annual diversion of approximately 550 ML of sewage normally discharged through ocean outfalls. As part of the long-term sustainability focus of the 'Sydney Olympic Park Master Plan 2030', the Sydney Olympic Park Authority (SOPA) has identified key best practice environmental sustainability approaches to include, the connection to recycled water and effective water demand management practices, maintenance and extension of recycled water systems to new streets as required, and maintenance and extension of the existing stormwater system that recycles water, promotes infiltration to subsoil, filters pollutants and sediments, and minimises loads on adjoining waterways. The SOPA has used WSUD technology to ensure that the town remains 'nationally and internationally recognised for excellence and innovation in urban design, building design and sustainability, both in the present and for future generations.

== See also ==
- Atmospheric water generator
- Blue roof
- Green infrastructure for stormwater management / Low-impact development (North America)
- Hydropower
- Nature-based solutions (European Union)
- Permeable paving
- Rainwater harvesting
- Rainwater management
- Retention basin
- Sponge city (China)
- Sydney Catchment Authority (dissolved 2015)
- Water demand management
- Water conservation
