= Cornice =

Horizontal decorative moulding that crowns a building or furniture

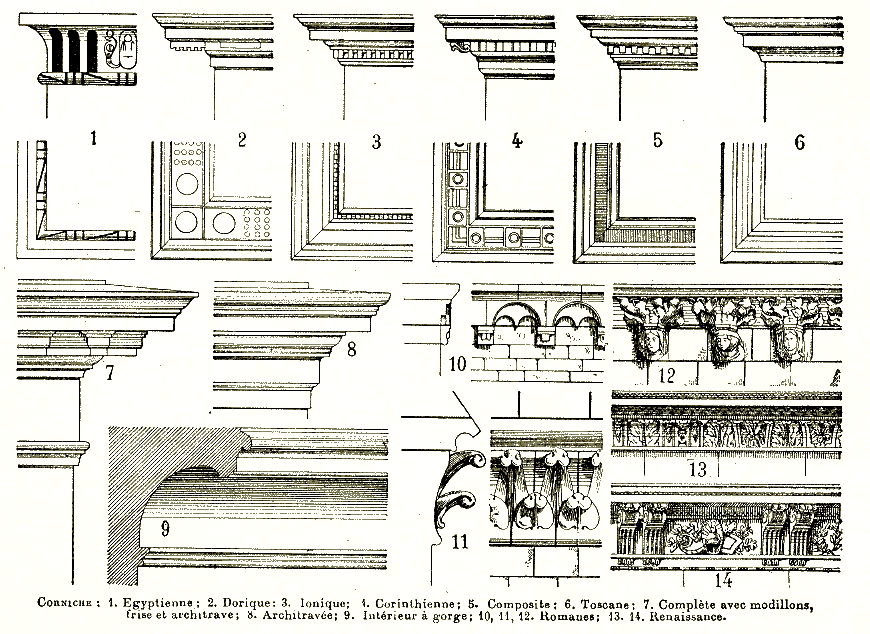
Illustrations of cornices in different styles

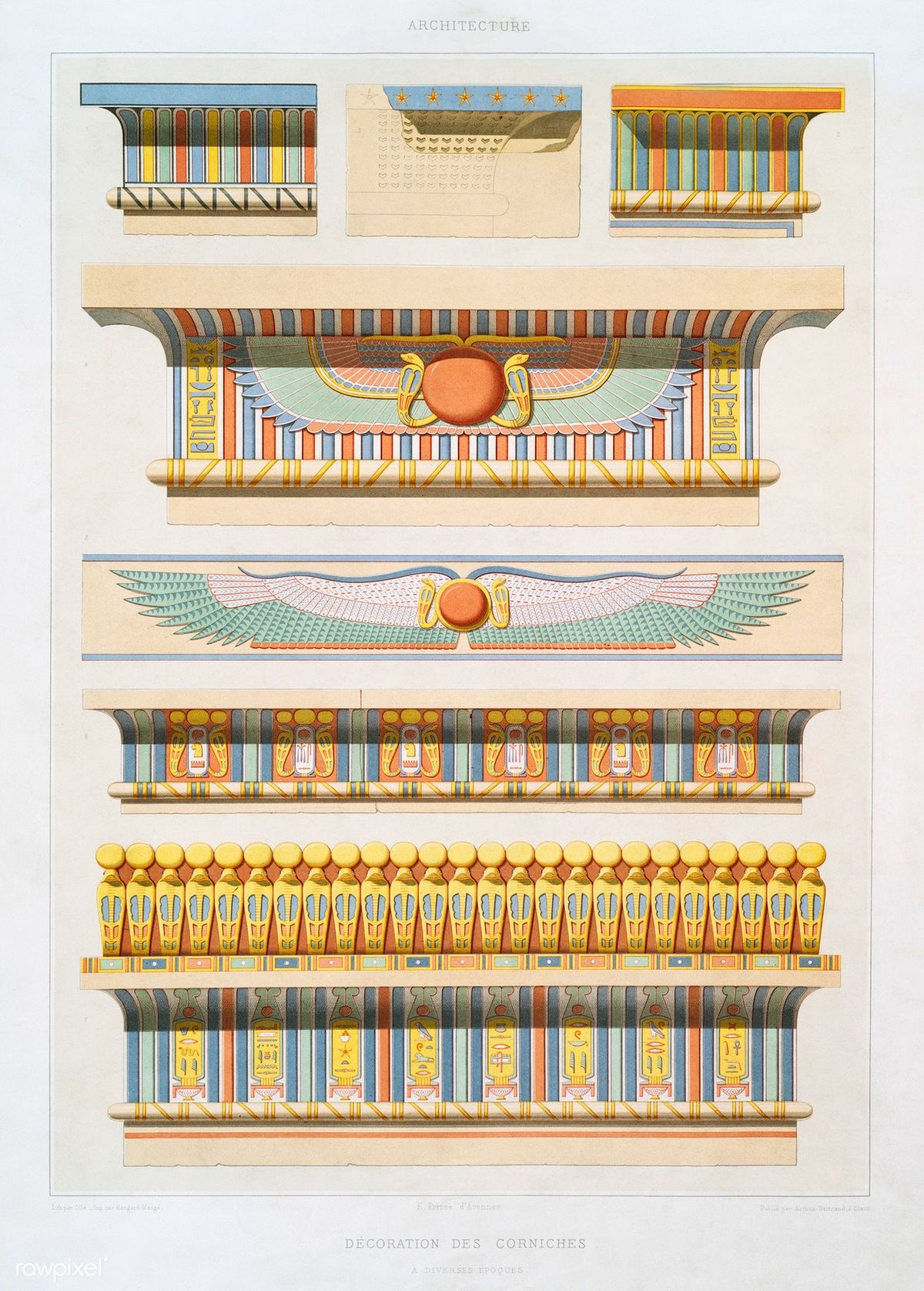
Illustrations of various examples of ancient Egyptian cornices, all of them having cavettos

In architecture, a cornice (from Italian cornice 'ledge') is generally any horizontal decorative moulding that crowns a building or furniture element. Examples include the cornice over a door or window, around the top edge of a pedestal, or along the top of an interior wall. A simple cornice may be formed with a crown, as in crown moulding atop an interior wall or above kitchen cabinets or a bookcase.

A projecting cornice on a building has the function of diverting rainwater away from its walls. In residential building design, this function is handled by projecting gable ends, roof eaves, and gutters. However, house eaves may also be called "cornices" if they are finished with decorative moulding. In this sense, while most cornices are also eaves (overhanging the sides of the building), not all eaves are usually considered cornices. Eaves are primarily functional and not necessarily decorative, while cornices have a decorative aspect.

A building's projecting cornice may appear to be heavy and hence in danger of falling, particularly on commercial buildings, but it often is actually very light and made of pressed metal.

== In classical architecture ==
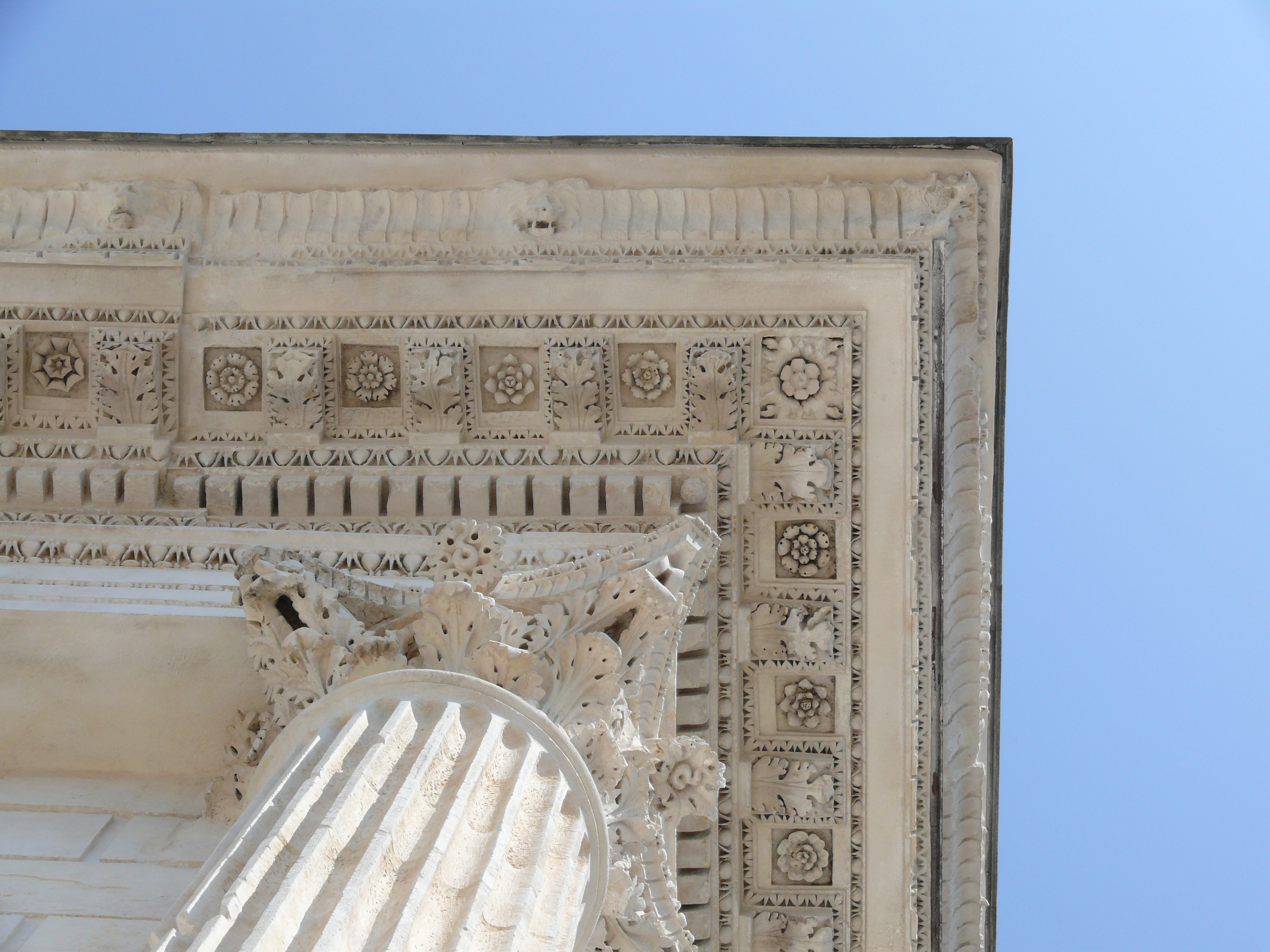
Cornice of Maison Carrée (Nîmes, France), a Roman temple in the Corinthian order, with dentils nearest the wall.

In Ancient Greek architecture and its successors using the classical orders in the tradition of classical architecture, the cornice is the topmost element of the entablature, which consists (from top to bottom) of the cornice, the frieze, and the architrave.

Where a triangular pediment is above the entablature, the cornice continues all round the triangle, the two sides being "raking cornices". The vertical space below the cornice is typically decorated by dentils (little teeth) or the larger modillions. The soffit, or horizontal space under a projecting cornice, may be elaborately carved with vegetal designs.

== In modern residential architecture ==
=== Rake ===
A rake is an architectural term for an eave or cornice that runs along the gable of the roof of a modern residential structure. It may also be called a sloping cornice, a raking cornice. The trim and rafters at this edge are called rakes, rake board, rake fascia, verge-boards, barge-boards or verge- or barge-rafters. It is a sloped timber on the outside facing edge of a roof running between the ridge and the eave. On a typical house, any gable will have two rakes, one on each sloped side. The rakes are often supported by a series of lookouts (sometimes also called strong arms) and may be trimmed with a rake fascia board (which is not a true fascia) on the outside facing edge and a rake soffit along the bottom.

=== Types ===
The cornices of a modern residential building will usually be one of three types: a box cornice, a close or closed cornice, or an open cornice.

==== Box cornice ====
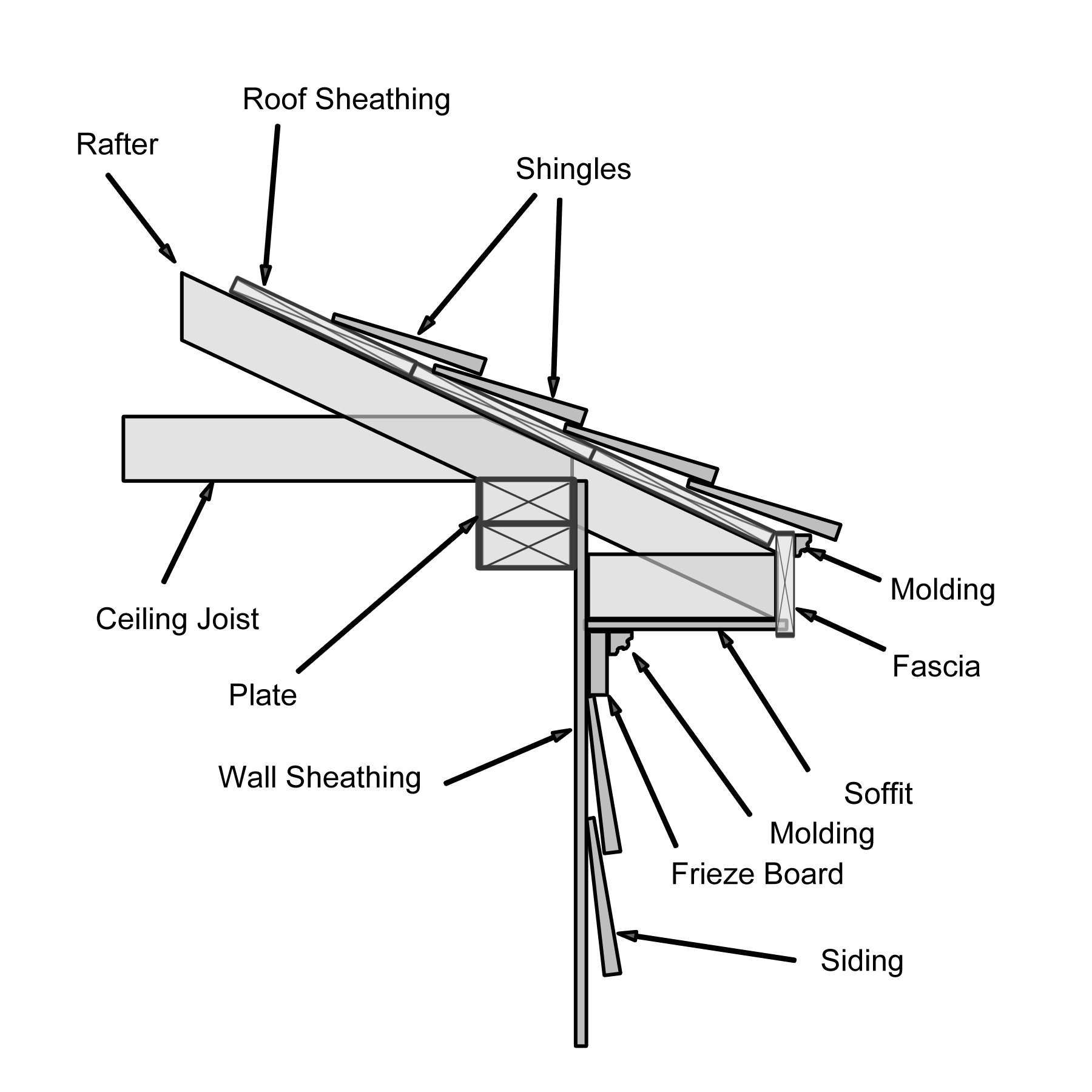
A wide box cornice with lookouts

Box cornices enclose the cornice of the building with what is essentially a long, narrow box. A box cornice may further be divided into either the narrow box cornice or the wide box cornice type. A narrow box cornice is one in which "the projection of the rafter serves as a nailing surface for the soffit board as well as the fascia trim." This is possible if the slope of the roof is fairly steep and the width of the eave relatively narrow. A wide box cornice, a common practice on houses with gentle roof slopes and wide eaves, requires lookouts to support it and provide a surface to attach the soffits securely. Box cornices often have ventilation screens laid over openings cut in the soffits to allow air to circulate within the cornice.

==== Close cornice ====
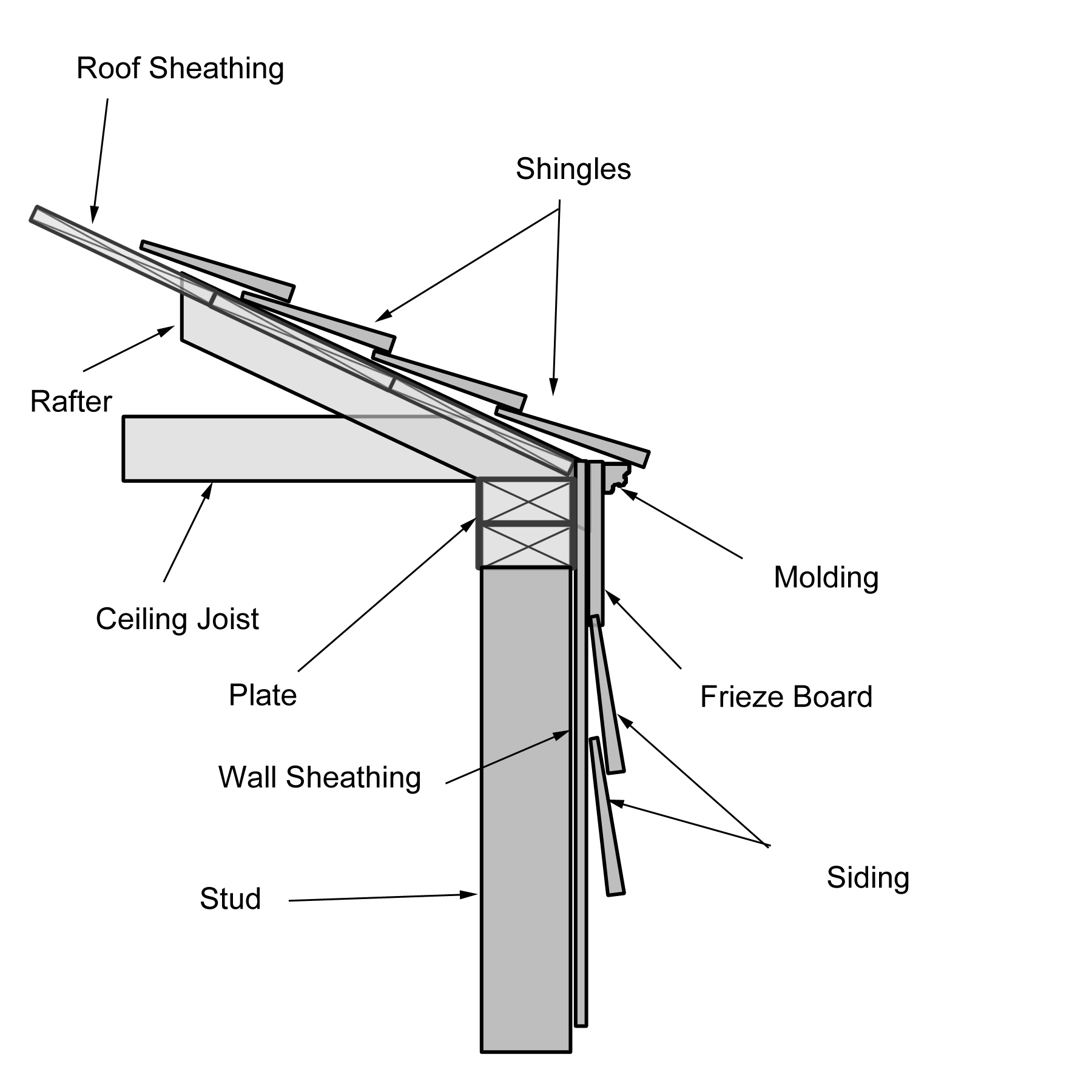
A close cornice

A closed or snub cornice is one in which there is no projection of the rafters beyond the walls of the building and, therefore, no soffit or fascia. This type of cornice is easy to construct but provides little aid in dispersing water away from the building and is sometimes considered to lack aesthetic value.

==== Open cornice ====
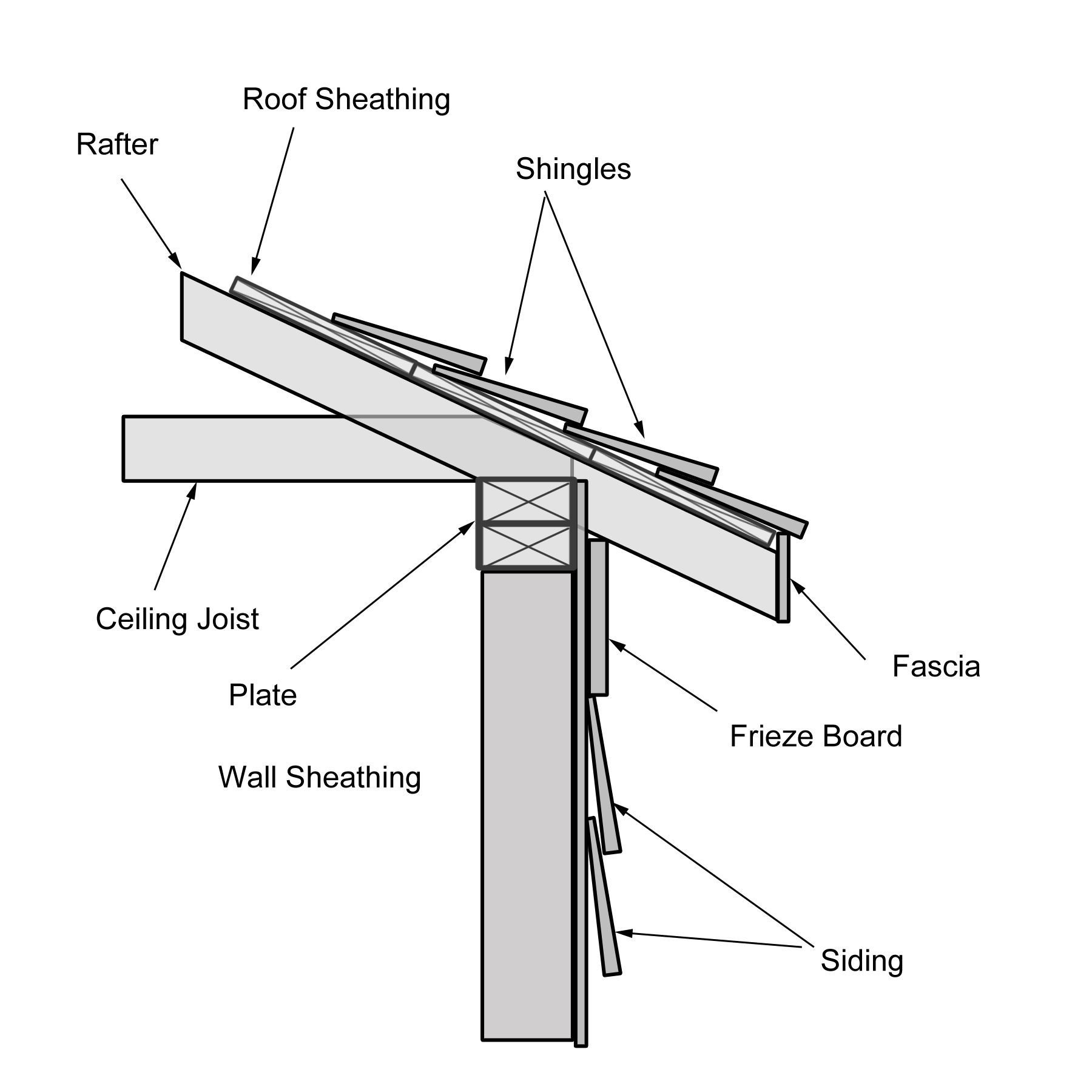
An open cornice

In an open cornice, the shape of the cornice is similar to that of a wide box cornice, except that both the lookouts and the soffit are absent. It is a lower-cost treatment that requires fewer materials and may even have no fascia board, but it lacks the finished appearance of a box cornice.

==== Cavetto cornice ====
Ancient Egyptian architectural tradition made special use of large cavetto mouldings as a cornice, with only a short fillet (plain vertical face) above, and a torus moulding (convex semi-circle) below. This cavetto cornice is sometimes also known as an "Egyptian cornice", "hollow and roll" or "gorge cornice". It has been suggested to be a reminiscence in stone architecture of the primitive use of bound bunches of reeds as supports for buildings, the weight of the roof bending their tops out.

The cavetto cornice, often forming less than a quarter-circle, influenced Egypt's neighbours and as well as appearing in early Ancient Greek architecture, it is seen in Syria and ancient Iran, for example at the Tachara palace of Darius I at Persepolis, completed in 486 BC. Inspired by this precedent, it was then revived by Ardashir I (r. 224–41 AD), the founder of the Sasanian dynasty.

The cavetto took the place of the cymatium in many Etruscan temples, often painted with vertical "tongue" patterns, and combined with the distinctive "Etruscan round moulding", often painted with scales. A typical example may be seen at the reconstructed Etruscan temple at Villa Giulia.

Additional more obscure varieties of cornice include the architrave cornice, bracketed cornice, and modillion cornice.

=== Cornice return ===
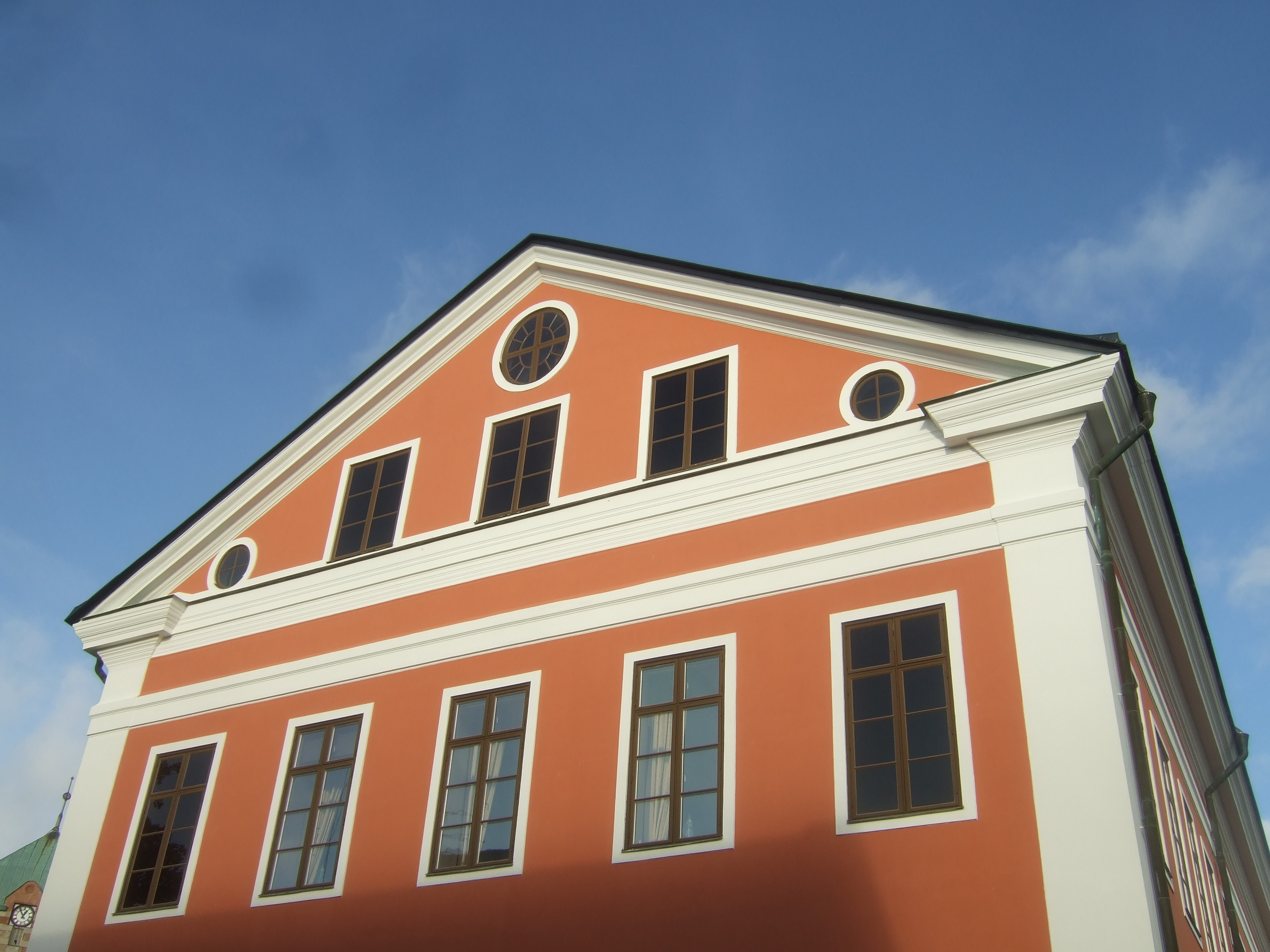
A gable roof with two cornice returns on the Härnösands rådhus

A cornice return is an architectural detail that occurs where a roof's horizontal cornice connects to a gable's rake. It is a short horizontal extension of the cornice that occurs on each side of the gable end of the building (see picture of Härnösands rådhus with two of these). The two most common types of cornice return are the Greek return and the soffit return (also called a boxed or box soffit return). The former includes a sloped hip shape on the inside of the cornice under the eaves, which is sheathed or shingled like the rest of the roof above it and is considered very attractive; the latter is a simple return without these features.

== As window treatment ==
The term cornice may also be used to describe a form of hard window treatment along the top edge of a window. In this context, a cornice represents a board (usually wood) placed above the window to conceal the mechanism for opening and closing drapes. If covered in a layer of cloth and given padding, it is sometimes called a soft cornice rather than a hard cornice.

== Gallery ==
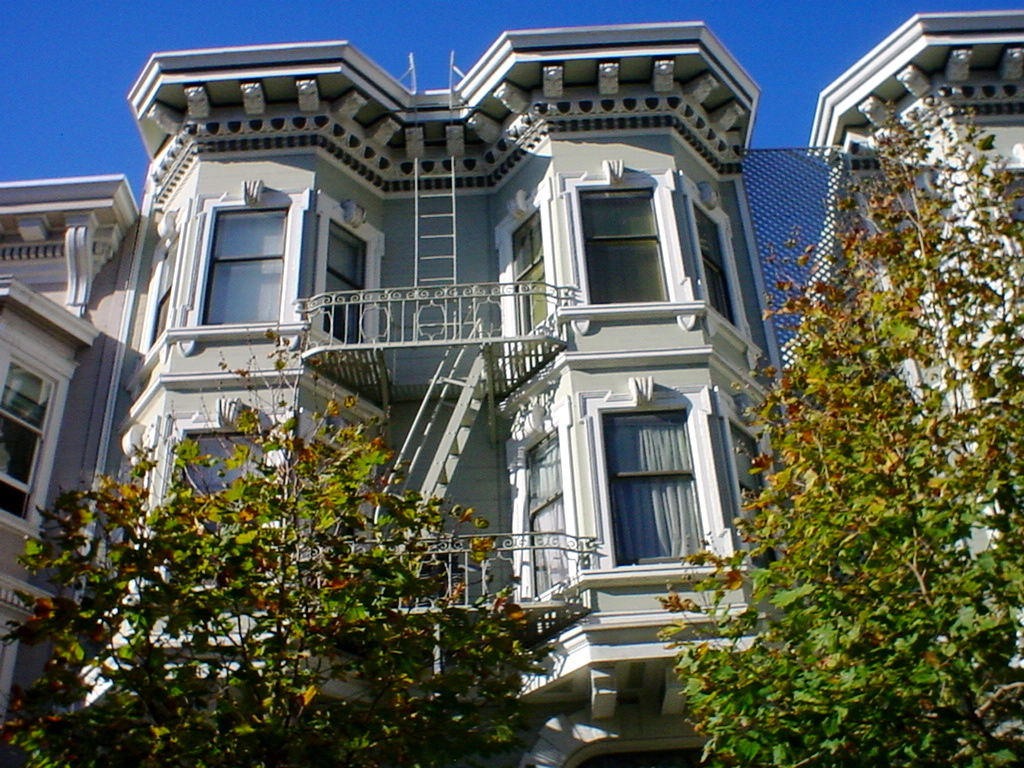
Projecting cornice of a painted wooden Italianate residence

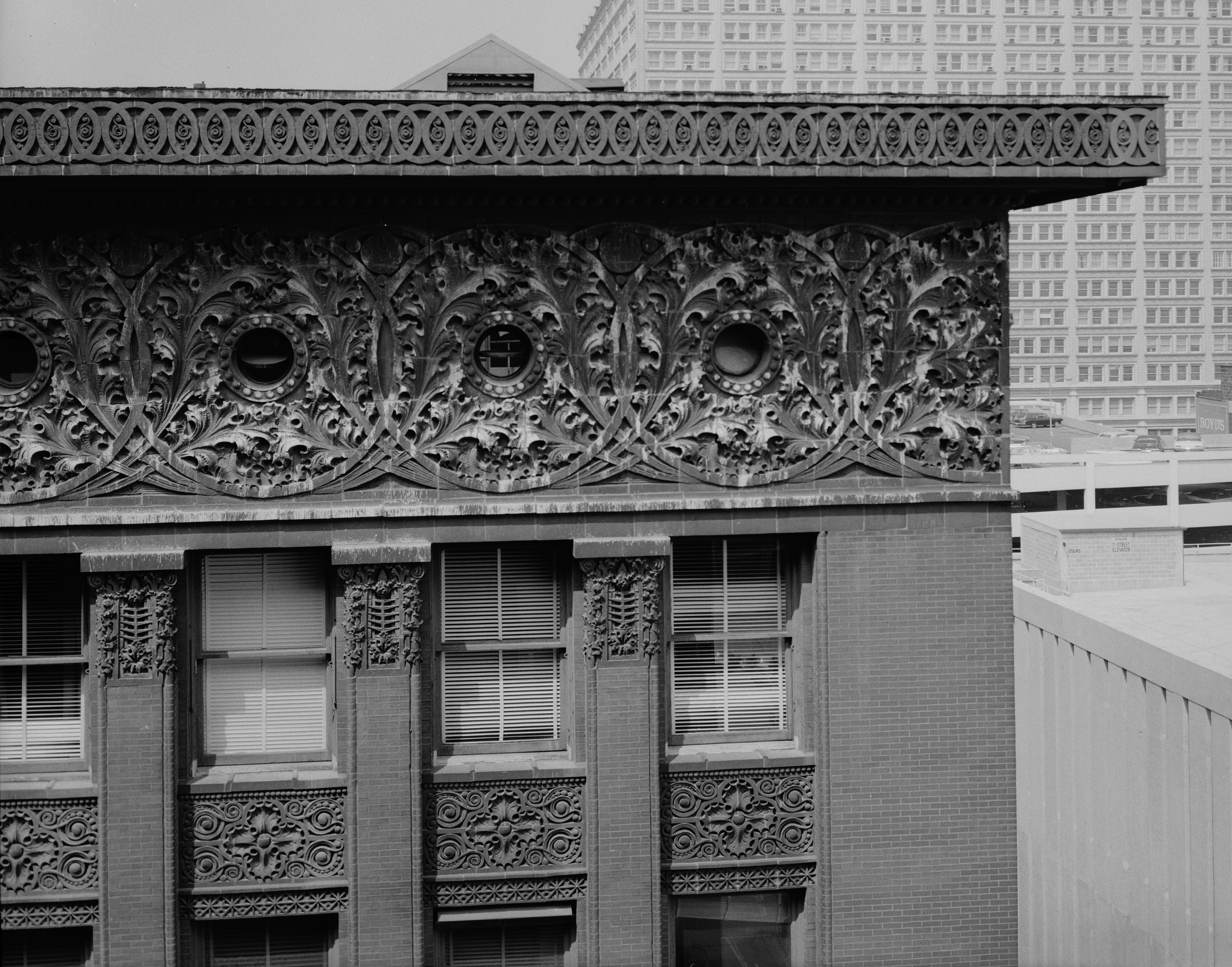
The Wainwright Building by Louis Sullivan

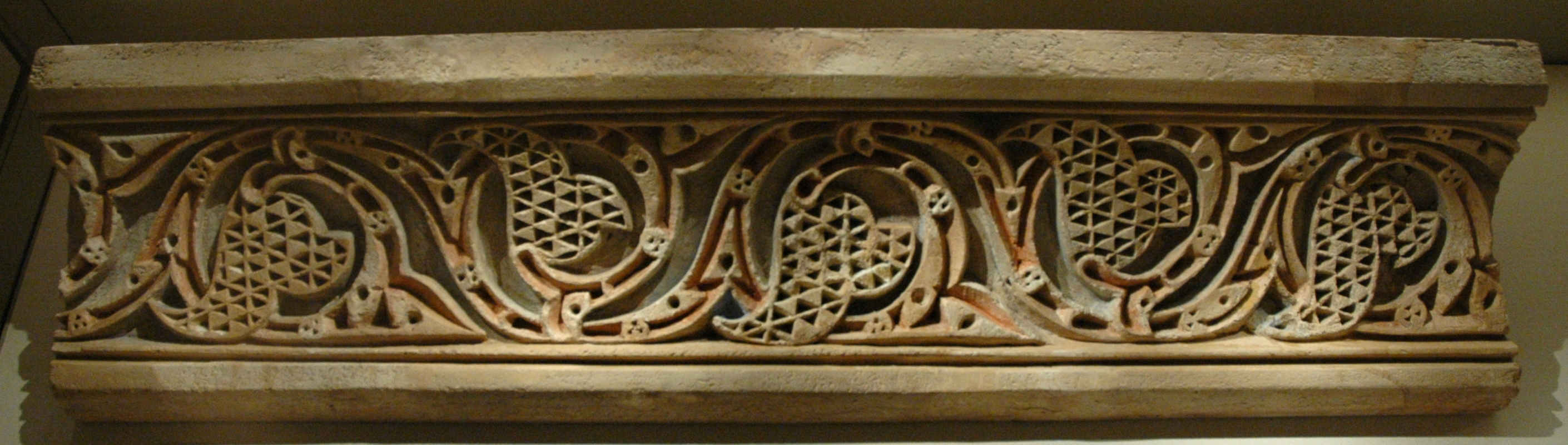
Cornice with running leaf pattern from Nishapur, 10th century, exhibited in the Metropolitan Museum of Art (New York City)

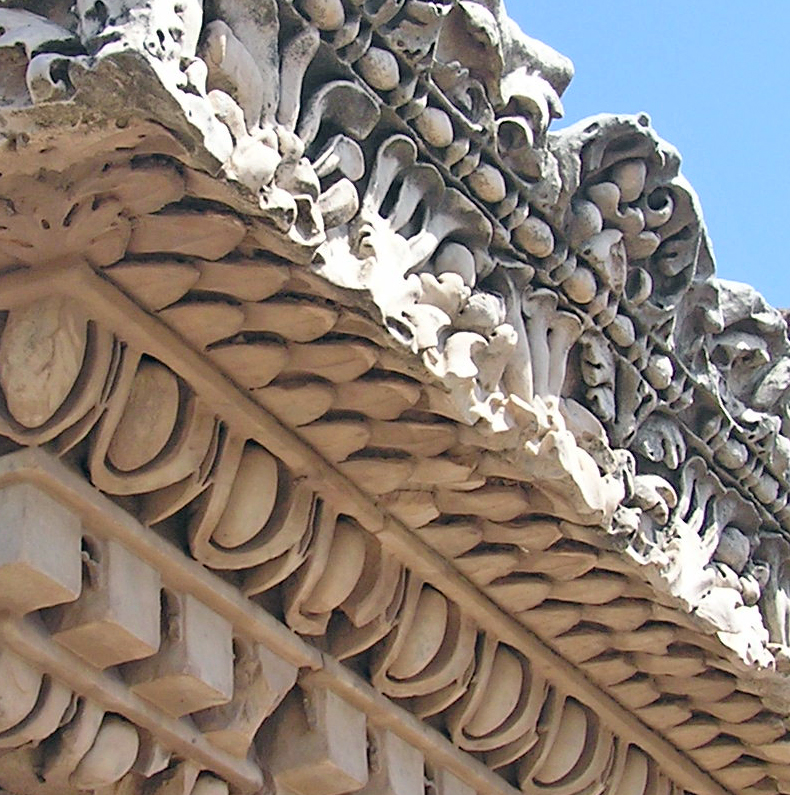
Roman cornice of ionic order, from Imperial palace on the Palatine hill in Rome (Flavian epoch)

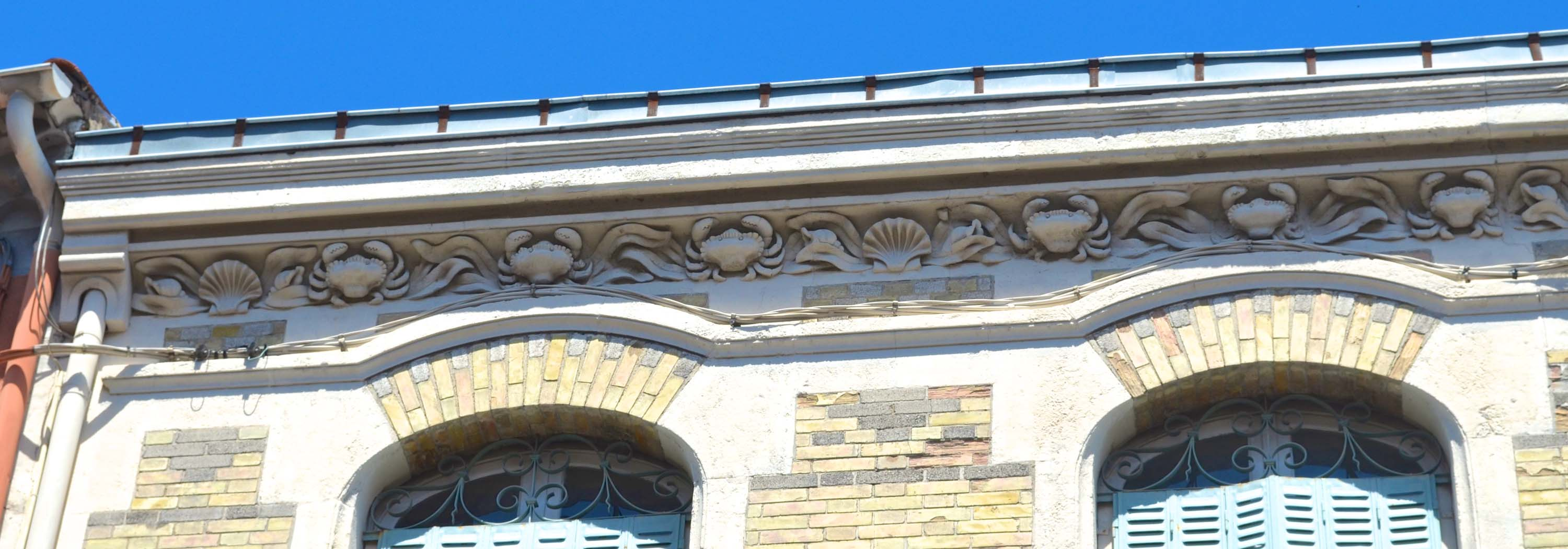
Art Nouveau corniche with crabs, shells and seaweeds, in Valence (France)

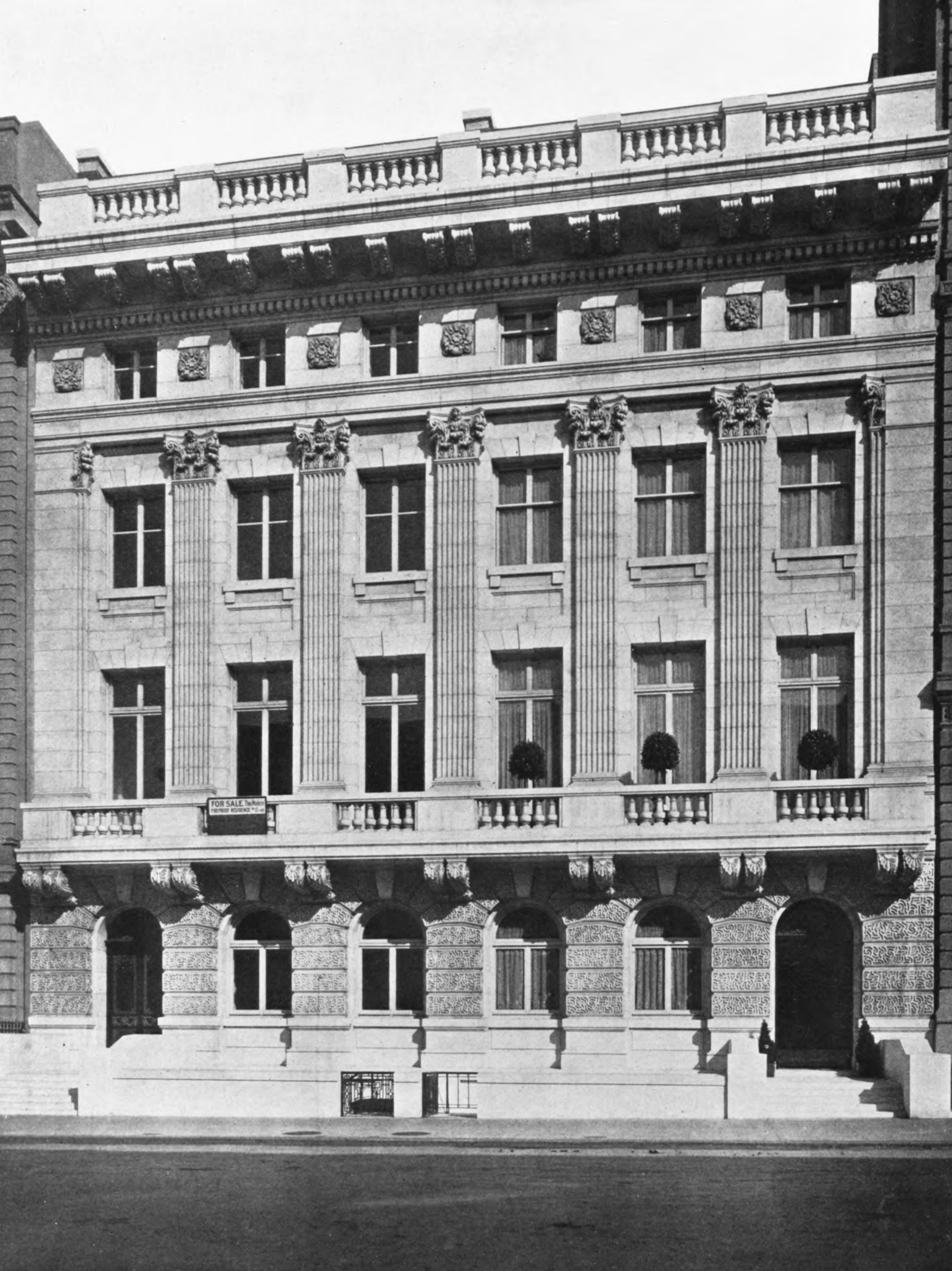
Bracketed cornice

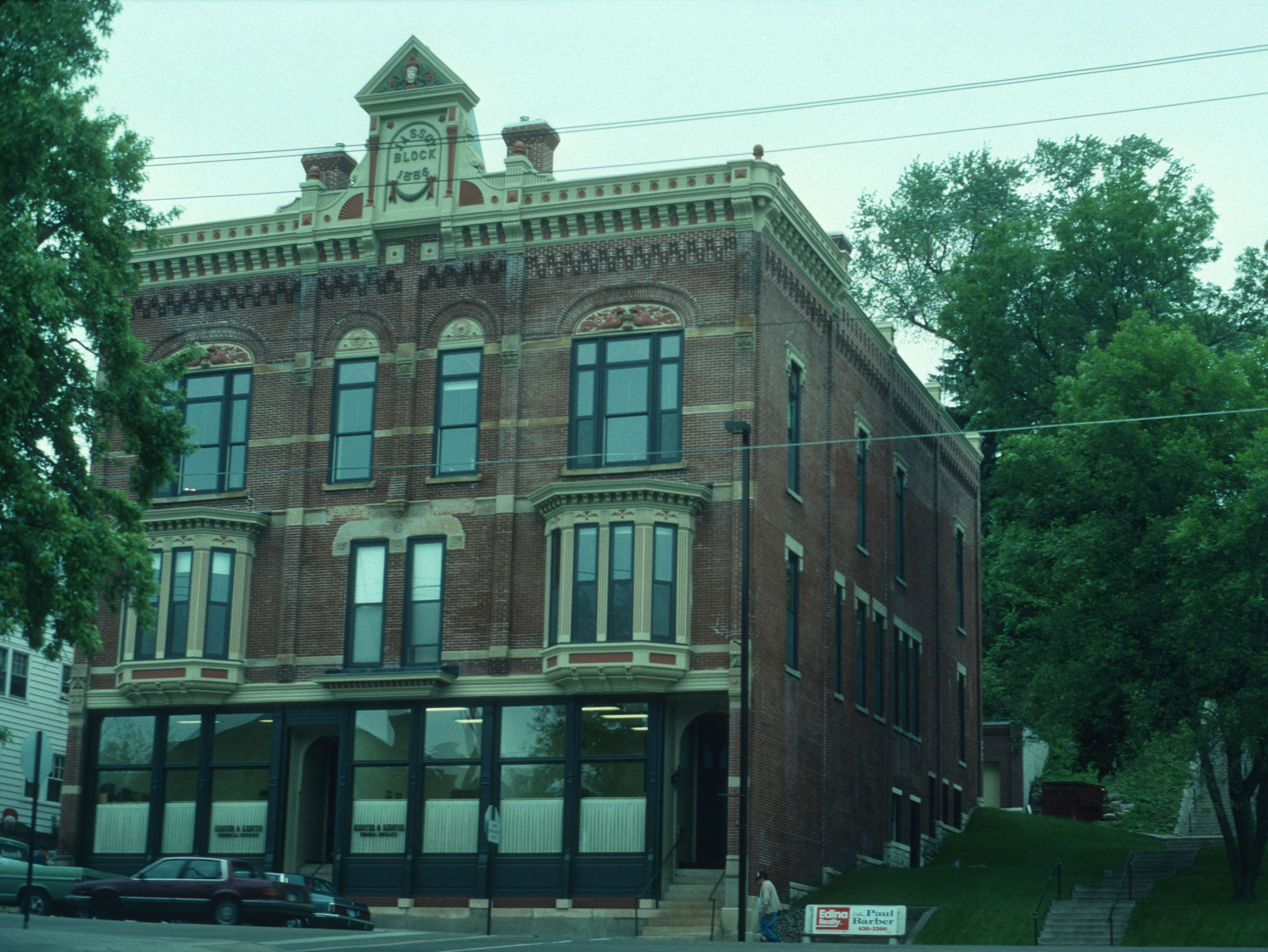
Elaborate cornice on Jassoy Building in Stillwater, Minnesota

== See also ==
- Eaves
- Geison
