= Water demand management =

Until relatively recently problems with water supply-demand balance were typically addressed through "supply augmentation", that is to say, building more dams, water treatment stations, etc. As long as water resources were considered abundant and the needs of the natural environment were ignored this reliance on the "engineering paradigm" made sense. Moreover, water utilities and governments have long preferred large capital projects to the less profitable and more difficult challenges of improving system efficiency (e.g. leakage reduction) and demand management. Water demand management came into vogue in the 1990s and 2000s at the same moment dams and similar supply augmentation schemes went out of fashion because they were increasingly seen as overly expensive, damaging to the environment (see Environmental impact of reservoirs), and socially unjust. Now, in the 2020s, it is accurate to say that demand management is the dominant approach in the richer countries of North America and Europe, but is also becoming more popular in less affluent countries and regions.

== Definitions and approaches ==
At its heart, demand management is about forecasting demand for good and services and planning how that demand will be met. In many applications demand management is also increasingly about reducing or moderating demand (e.g. water, energy, acute clinical health services, etc.). In energy demand management, for example, the offer of cheaper off-peak energy tariffs is a common method for shifting energy demand away from peak periods and towards periods when there is surplus energy available.

Water demand management depends on better understanding of exactly how much water different users are using for different purposes (the quantitative challenge) and on users' decision-making processes (the qualitative challenge). With these sorts of data it is possible to create policies, at utility scale (usually a city-region) or national scale (government), to promote reductions in user demand. If skilfully done, such policies can address supply-demand imbalances by reducing demand to available supply, though the risk of negative impacts on utilities, consumers and the environment are all too real. There are three basic approaches to water demand management policy and one key challenge, all of which are discussed below with reference to the key sectors where water demand management is practiced: domestic, agricultural and industrial.

== Domestic water demand management ==
=== Consumer education ===
All water utilities and most governments now pursue programmes of public education aimed at reducing in water use. Such programmes have increasingly moved on-line, targeting consumers with tweets, Instagram posts and even TikToks promoting water conservation. This is a change from previous approaches based on physical mailshots of enclosures with water bills, with little evidence that they exercised much influence on water users' behaviours.

An under-recognised challenge with consumer education approaches to demand management is that they tend to assume that water users are always rational agents, collecting all relevant data and then producing purely rational decisions based on the data. Research into water users' behaviours shows that most decisions are more linked to habit, perception and social conventions than rationality, particularly in the domestic sphere. In agriculture and industry consumer education approaches are less common, as there is a greater reliance on water tariffs and direct state regulation of water abstraction and wastewater return.

=== Replacement of fixtures and fittings ===
In city-regions where supply constraints are more severe water utilities have occasionally adopted the approach of offering to replace water-consumptive fixtures and fittings with water-conservative ones. A good example is in south California where worries about running out of water led to a comprehensive programme of consumer education, leak detection, tariff reform and plumbing retrofits. Key to success has been the replacement of over two million high flush volume toilets with low flush volume alternatives. The authority has also supplied more than three million high efficiency showerheads and over two hundred thousand tap/faucet aerators (mixing air with water reduces flow rates whilst maintaining performance). These measures have saved over 66,000 acre-feet (conversion) of water per year, which can then be directed to improving supply-demand balance.

=== Water tariff/price reform ===
Many commentators argue that utilities often do not charge prices that encourage users to conserve water. Certainly domestic water tariffs are low in North America and Europe, and indeed in much of the rest of the world. But the drive to discipline user demand by ratcheting up water tariffs brings with it a series of problems. First, available research suggests that there is relatively little "price elasticity of demand" linked to domestic water consumption—estimates vary between about -0.1 and -0.4, meaning that the demand for water decreases by 0.1% to 0.4% for every 1% increase in tariffs. Second, attempts to achieve demand reduction by increasing price can create "water poverty" (usually defined as households spending more than 3-5% of household income on water services). Third, the data and data management required for even simple charging schemes (single volumetric charges) can cost more than the saved water cost to produce in the first place. More complex tariffs (e.g. rising block or seasonal tariffs) require even more expensive and complex data systems that are not yet widespread even in richer countries.

=== The problem of data ===
Assessing the efficacy of the above policies, singly or in combination, requires data that is expensive to acquire and complex to manage and process. Moreover, since water consumption is the product of a large number of interacting drivers, constraints and schemes, involving periodic social media or mail-shot communications to consumers promoting water conservation, require sufficiently frequent meter readings (e.g. daily, weekly or monthly) at household scale to be quite expensive to implement. All the more so in countries like the UK where domestic meter penetration is only 60 or 65%. Much enthusiasm has been generated around the prospects that so-called smart meters (meters combining measurement, data logging and communications) could greatly facilitate water demand management. To date results are not encouraging, mostly due to the relatively poor state of the required data infrastructure.

== Irrigation demand management ==
Agricultural water use is vastly larger than industrial or domestic water use globally and in most countries, therefore irrigation water demand management is an important topic. As with domestic water demand management lack of appropriate data is a frequently encountered problem signalling the importance of measuring water usage at the farm and distributor level and at appropriate time steps. As an historical aside, there is evidence from both historical and archaeological records of technology development for water allocation and assessment in India, the Arabian Peninsula and Peru.

Two major themes dominate research in irrigation water demand management: attempts to understand, and manipulate, farmers' irrigation decision-making and understanding optimal irrigation strategies for specific crops or environments.

== Industrial water demand management ==
Water demand management in industry is managed primarily through regulation of water abstraction (especially for large industrial water users) and regulation of wastewater discharge. In many countries large water users can apply for permits to directly remove ="abstract"- water from the natural environment for industrial purposes. A common example is the energy industry which requires large volumes of water for cooling purposes in thermal and hydropower electricity generation facilities. In the UK electricity generators are responsible for more than half of all licensed water abstraction. In other countries the proportion of abstraction earmarked for electricity generation varies widely, but it almost always a significant factor in overall water supply demand balance. Many studies of this water-energy nexus focus on process optimisation or input substitution.

An important part of industrial water demand management is the encouragement of "closed loop" processes within facilities. For example, in textiles production, which uses significant volumes of water for washing and dying, closed loop principles in water use reduce both the total demand for new abstractions and the risk to the natural environment from inadequately treated wastewaters. Such approaches however require significant capital investment, especially in modern multi-stage wastewater treatment, and are not yet universal in textiles facilities around the world.

== Current research directions ==
Since pressures on water suppliers continue to mount, researchers are increasingly focussing on developing the empirical data base underpinning demand management approaches. As noted above, how far researchers can go in large measure depends on data infrastructure and there have been innovations here too. There are increasing numbers of studies that focus on special environments (e.g. university student accommodation, military housing, etc.) and have compiled the required quantitative and qualitative data to robustly assess the impact of demand reduction policies/programmes. There are also ongoing efforts to rigorously determine price elasticity of demand for more generalised residential populations.

There are also new approaches emerging, based on the critique of the mainstream approach's tendency to assume rational agents as the policy target. In particular, social practice theory and the related ISM ("individual, social, material") approaches abandon the idea of rational agents and focus attention on the co-constitutive interrelations between people deploying materials within complex social frames. These water-mediated interrelations were extensively researched by the "Traces of Water" research project led by Browne, Pullinger and Medd in the first decade of the 21st century.

== See also ==
- Customer demand planning
- Forecasting
- Supply and demand
- Water conservation
- Water security
- water supply and sanitation in Malaysia
- Cape Town water crisis
