= Rainwater management =

Rainwater management is a series of countermeasures to reduce runoff volume and improve water quality by replicating the natural hydrology and water balance of a site, with consideration of rainwater harvesting, urban flood management and rainwater runoff pollution control.

The continuous growth of human populations and the consequent growing need for drinking water is a global problem. Rainwater is an important source of drinking water, and as a free source of water, considerable quantities can be collected from roof catchments and other surface areas for various uses. Due to water shortages, rainfall events and flooding, attention has been given to rainwater management. Rainwater management re-conceptualizes urban rainwater, transforming it from a community risk to a resource for urban development, and good rainwater management is important for the design of sanitation systems and the environment, nowadays different methods of rainwater management have been developed, including reduction of impervious surfaces, separation of rainwater and sanitary sewers, collection and reuse of rainwater, and Low-impact development (LID). Global Rainwater Management Program (GRMP).

== Components ==
=== Rainwater harvesting and use ===
Rainwater harvesting (RWH) is the process of collecting and storing rainwater rather than letting it run off. Rainwater harvesting systems are increasingly becoming an integral part of the sustainable rainwater management "toolkit" and are widely used in homes, home-scale projects, schools and hospitals for a variety of purposes including watering gardens, livestock, irrigation, home use with proper treatment and home heating. For households it is effective in reducing electricity and greenhouse gas emissions and providing domestic water; for urban agriculture, it is effective in reducing rainwater runoff and related issues; and for industry, it provides sustainability of facilities and low financial resource utilization.

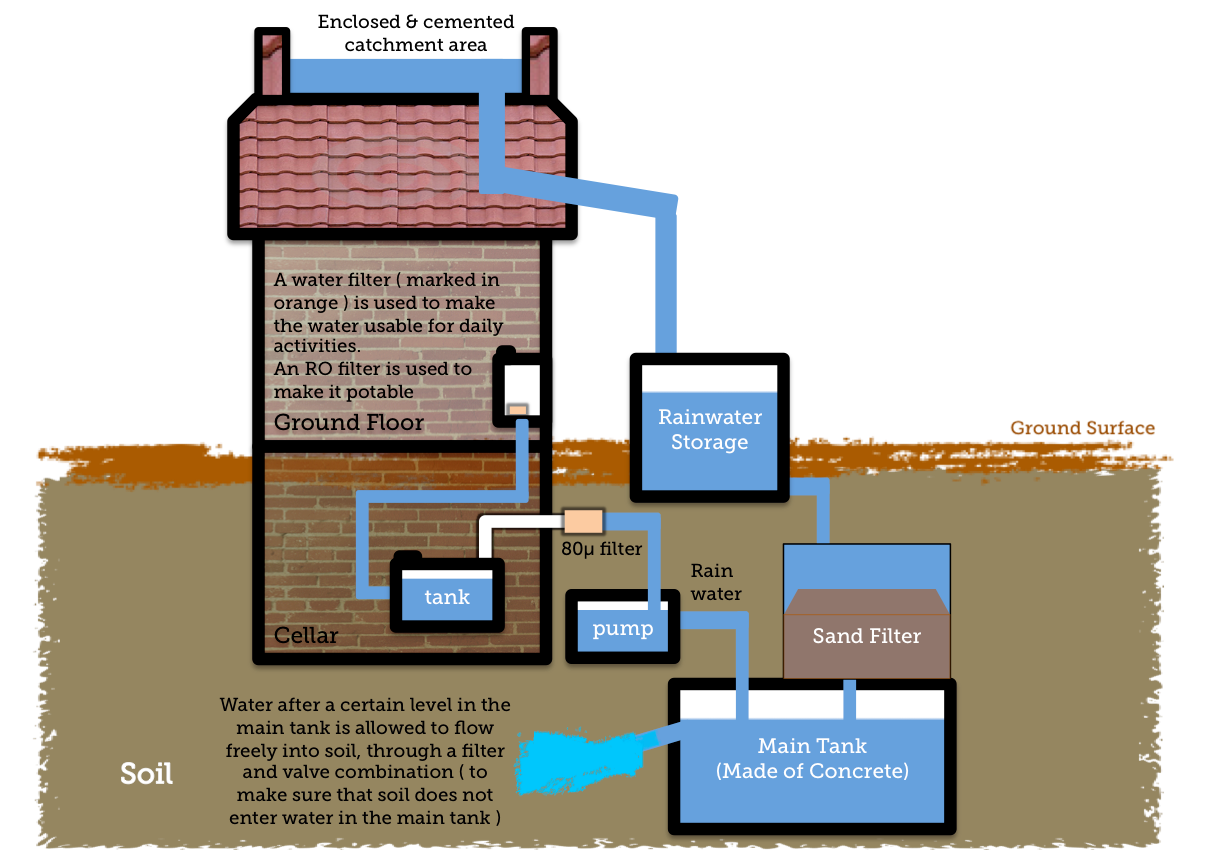
Rainwater harvesting and use system

Rainwater harvested from roof structures or other compact surfaces is discharged through drains into storage tank, processed by treatment systems and then deployed in use facilities to complete the beneficial use of rainwater. Rainwater so treated is mainly used for irrigation, washing, laundry, and in some countries it is also considered as drinking water after the necessary purification.

=== Urban flood management ===
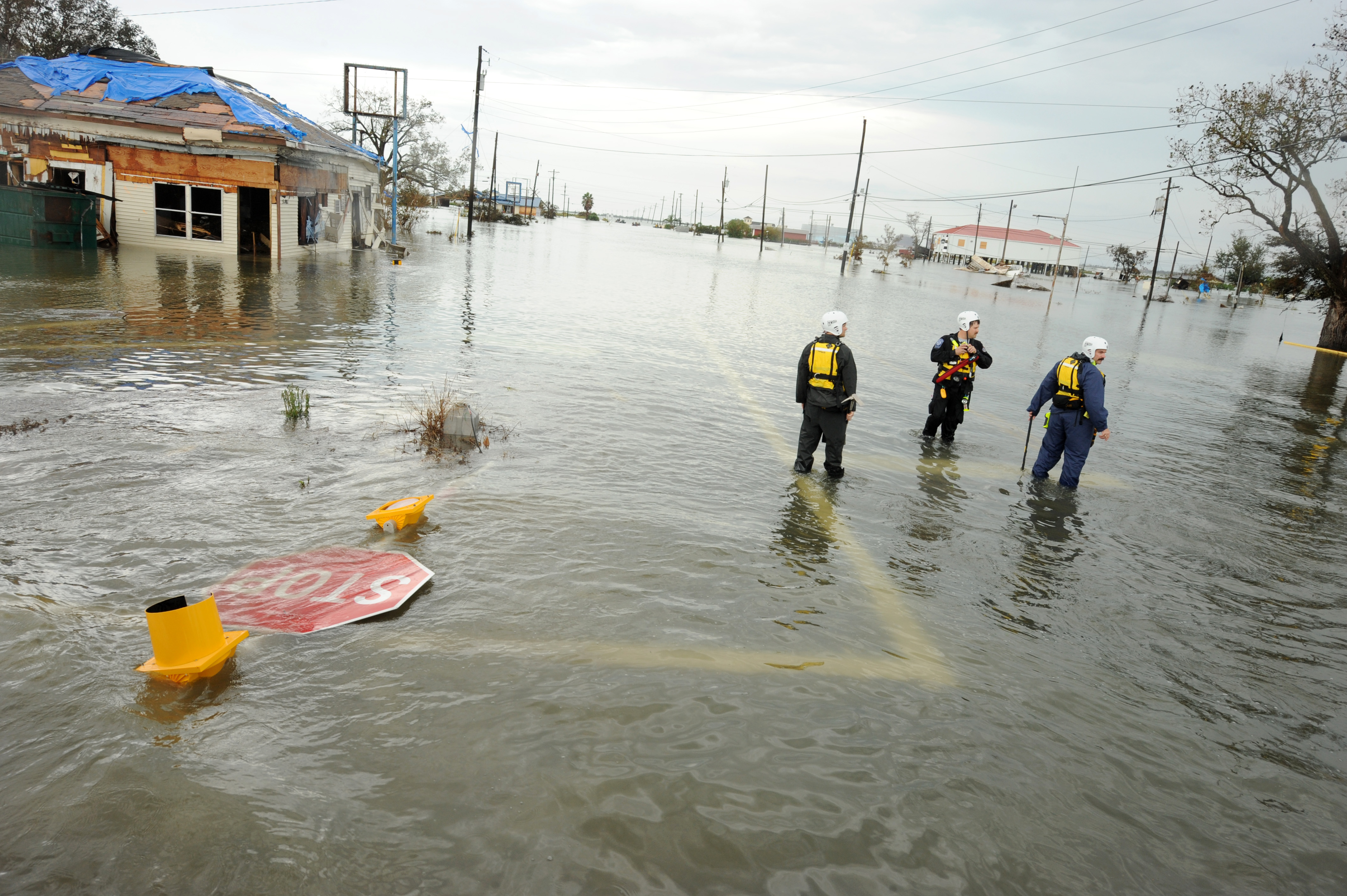
Urban flood

Urban flood management has now become one of the highest priorities in urban development, Urban flooding has a major impact on both public transportation systems and supply chains and is an important topic in rainwater management

==== Gray-green infrastructure ====
The use of combined sewer systems to treat excess rainwater runoff is common in older urban areas. The Combined Sewer System (CSS) collects rainwater runoff, domestic sewage and industrial wastewater into a single pipe. Combined sewer overflows (CSOs) occur when untreated wastewater is discharged to surface water beyond its hydraulic capacity, when this occurs, untreated rainwater and wastewater are discharged directly into nearby streams, rivers and other water bodies. Combined sewer overflows (CSOs) contain untreated or partially treated human and industrial waste, toxic materials and debris, and rainwater. a problem that is currently a key challenge for rainwater management and can lead to public health incidents. Gray-green infrastructure is the key technology to solve this problem and is the core technology of the currently introduced "sponge city". The implementation of gray infrastructure, such as upgrading drainage networks, storage facilities or pumping stations with large diameter pipes, is critical to drain rainwater from urban catchments, while most green infrastructure handles the storage and infiltration of rainwater and drainage of gray infrastructure

==== Constructed wetlands ====
Constructed wetlands for sewer overflows treatment are currently an effective and less costly option to prevent untreated wastewater from overflowing from polluted natural water bodies, and constructed wetlands that act as retention ponds during the rainy season can collect and treat rainwater due to their natural purification function, and produce high quality water for reuse after treatment by constructed wetlands with aeration system and soils infiltration system.

==== Separate sewer systems ====
The conversion of Combined Sewer System (CSS) to separate sewer systems with retention ponds will not only increase rainwater drainage and reduce the potential for urban flooding, but their own retention ponds will also retain pollutants, thereby reducing or preventing unnecessary pollution of a single receiving waters.

==== Land use ====
The ratio of pervious to impervious surfaces is important in flood management. Building vegetated spaces, such as parks integrated with urban facilities, can increase the amount of pervious area. For new and redevelopment projects, reduce the amount of impervious surfaces, such as buildings, roads, parking lots, and other structures.

=== Low-impact development (LID) ===
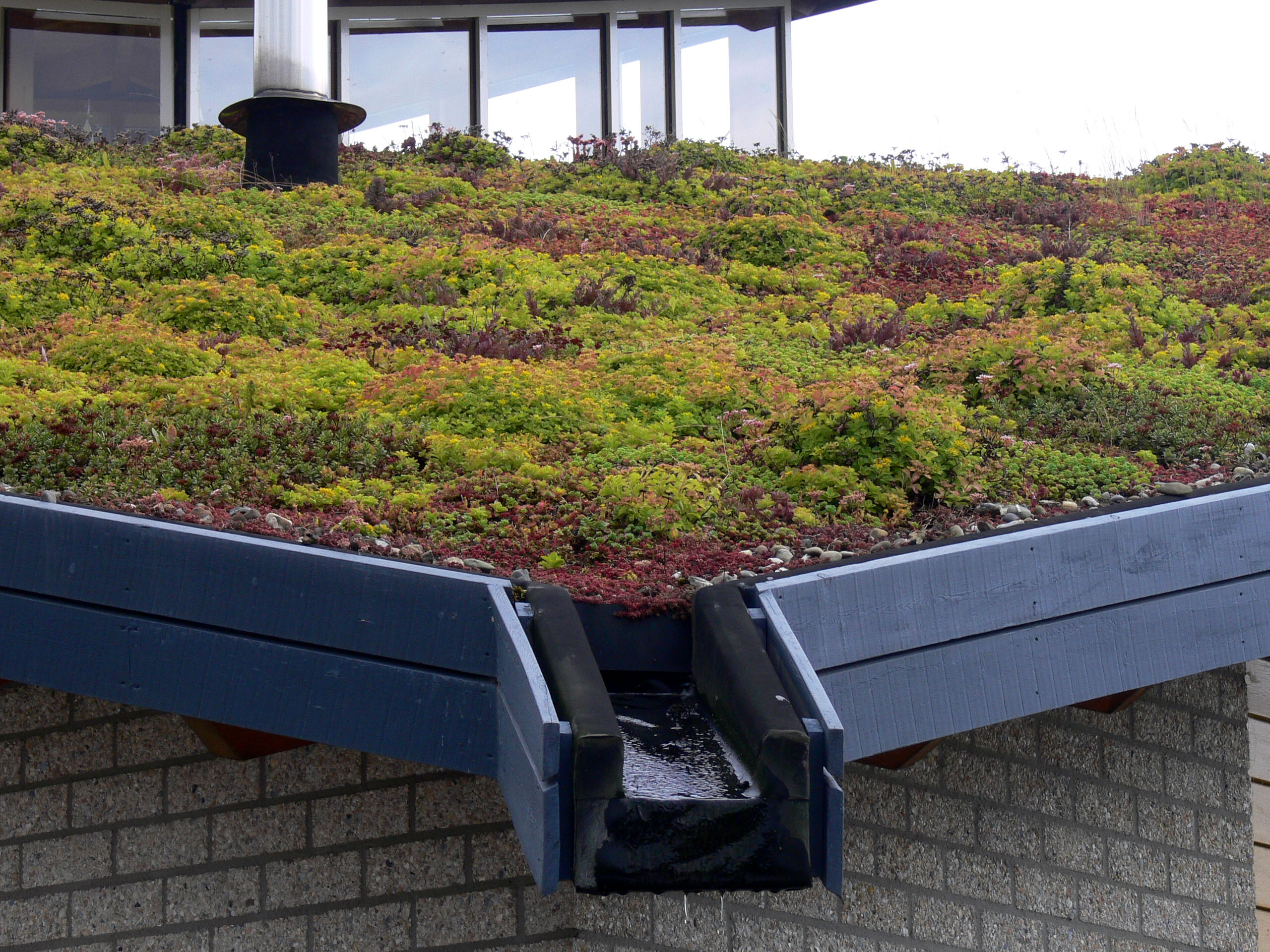
Low-impact development green roof

Low-impact development (LID) refers to systems and practices that use or mimic natural processes that result in the infiltration, evapotranspiration or use of stormwater in order to protect water quality and associated aquatic habitat. Low-impact development (LID) practices provide more sustainable solutions than traditional piping and storm ponds in rainwater management. The sustainability of LID practices is achieved primarily through the use of porous pavement, bioretention, green roofs, rainwater harvesting, and other rainwater management strategies. Bioretention can effectively retain large amounts of runoff, porous pavement can effectively infiltrate rainwater runoff, and green roofs can retain rainwater under a variety of climatic conditions. These methods create and restore green space and reduce the impact of built-up areas at the site and regional scales, promoting the natural flow of water within an ecosystem or watershed. Applied over a wide range of scales, LID can maintain or restore the hydrologic and ecological functions of a watershed.

=== Rainwater management in agriculture ===
Applying rainwater management, surface runoff can be collected and stored in hand-dug farm ponds. To enhance irrigation in dry conditions, earthen ridges were constructed to collect and prevent rainwater from flowing down the hillsides and slopes. Even during periods of low rainfall, enough water can be collected for crop growth. Rainwater management can increase the productivity of smallholder farmers in arid environments. Productivity of rainfed agriculture is improved through supplemental irrigation, especially when combined with soil fertility management.

Global Rainwater Management Program (GRMP):''' UNCCD platform link

A comprehensive and globally scalable framework for integrated water resource management. It combines traditional harvesting techniques with advanced technologies, such as AI and GIS, and is differentiated by its focus on '''Contamination Reduction''' through multi-staged filtration and artificial wetlands before directing run-off for controlled '''Aquifer Recharge'''. Beyond the technical aspects, the program integrates a robust '''Financial Model''' that utilizes metrics like Return on Investment (ROI) and leverages methodologies such as '''Volumetric Water Benefit Accounting (VWBA)''' to quantify project benefits, which helps address investment gaps. The framework also extends its mandate to promoting '''Transboundary Water Security''' and conflict resolution by stabilizing regional water resources.

== Tools ==
Rainwater management as a means of multi-stage control and improvement of rainwater systems needs to go through multiple steps of analysis and design. In the era of Low-impact development, rainwater management has become a field with diverse expertise backgrounds. Rainwater management projects have tended to become Integrated project delivery (IPD), where designers need to consider rainwater management issues at a much earlier stage. The development and use of software such as Rainwater+ may help designers to implement rainwater management at the design stage. It's GUI and simple workflow can help designers with little to no experience in hydrology can use Rainwater+. This may reduce later building construction conflicts and facilitate communication between all parties and improve construction quality.

== Terminologies ==
=== Low impact development (LID) ===
The term Low-impact development is commonly used in North America and New Zealand, and was first used in the United States by Barlow et al.

=== Water sensitive urban design (WSUD) ===
Water sensitive urban design (WSUD) is a concept widely accepted and partially acted on throughout Australia's federal and state governments.

=== Integrated urban water management (IUWM) ===
IUWM derives from the broader term, Integrated Water Management, which involves the integrated management of all parts of the water cycle within a watershed.

=== Sustainable urban drainage systems (SUDS) ===
SUDS established in a similar but separate design manual that includes Scotland and Northern Ireland as well as England and Wales, SUDS consists of a range of techniques and technologies based on the concept of replicating the natural, pre-development drainage of the site as closely as possible, culminating in a management system.

== See also ==
- Integrated urban water management
- Urban flooding
- Constructed wetlands
- Low-impact development
- Water-sensitive urban design
- Sponge city
- Global Rainwater Management Program (GRMP)
