= Ashton Nichols =

- Born: Brooks Ashton Nichols; June 7, 1953 (age 73); Washington, D.C., U.S.
- Occupations: Author, professor, naturalist
- Years active: 1984–present
- Spouse: Kimberley A. Nichols (m. 1975)
- Children: 4

Brooks Ashton Nichols (born 1953) is the Walter E. Beach ’56 Distinguished Chair Emeritus in Sustainable Studies and Professor of English Language and Literature Emeritus at Dickinson College. His interests are in literature, contemporary ecocriticism, Romanticism, and nature writing. Nichols taught courses in Romanticism, 19th century literature, literature and the environment, and nature writing. He is especially well-known for his study of James Joyce's literary concept of "epiphany," his definition of Romantic natural histories, and his coinage of the phrase "Urbanatural roosting," an idea which links urban with natural modes of existence and argues for ways of living more lightly on the earth, for inhabiting our planet the way animals do, by altering our environments without harming those same environments.

== Academic background ==
Nichols graduated from the University of Virginia with a B.A. with high honors in Philosophy in 1975. As an undergraduate, he received a four-year full academic scholarship as a DuPont Regional Scholar and was elected to Phi Beta Kappa. He was also selected for an Honors Program in philosophy, a program which allowed him to sit in on any class at the university and work individually with a separate tutor for each of the three semesters: in epistemology, metaphysics, and ethics, and then to write an honors thesis in his final semester. On the advice of Cora Diamond, he attended University College London from 1973 to 1974 to study philosophy. He served as a staff reporter for the Fredericksburg, Virginia Free Lance-Star, where he received awards from the AP and the Virginia Press Association, and as an editor for the National Trust for Historic Preservation, before returning to the University of Virginia for an M.A. and later a Ph.D. in English Literature, specializing in Romantic and Victorian literature. He spent time as a Visiting Researcher at Cambridge University with John Beer. His Ph.D. dissertation, supervised by Robert Langbaum was titled "The Poetics of Epiphany: Nineteenth-Century Origins of the Modern Literary Moment". It was later revised for publication with the same title as his first book.

Nichols's time at Dickinson was punctuated by his membership on the President's Commission on Environmental Sustainability (PCES)--and before that, on the steering committee of the Center for Sustainability Education (CSE)--as a member of the Climate Change Curriculum Task Force, and a recipient of the Willoughby Institute Award for Teaching with Technology; he has also served on the Science Advisory Committee and the General Education Committee of the college. In 1994–95, he was a Visiting Lecturer at the University of East Anglia and Director of the Dickinson Programs in the Humanities and Sciences in Norwich, U.K. He was a member of the selection committee for the Sam Rose '58 and Julie Walters Prize at Dickinson College for Global Environmental Activism, a $100,000 a year award to a major environmentalist whose impact has been powerful and fully international. Recipients so far have included Bill McKibben (author and climate activist), Lisa P. Jackson (Barack Obama's first EPA administrator), James Balog (video and still photographer of melting glaciers and icecaps), Mark Ruffalo (actor and river activist), Elizabeth Kolbert (Pulitzer Prize-winning environmental writer for The New Yorker and professor at Williams College), Brett Jenks (CEO and president of conservation organization Rare), and Our Children's Trust (the organization that supports 21 young people—aged 11–22—who have brought suit against the federal U. S. government, claiming that the climate of the earth is being damaged in ways that threaten the youths' rights to life, liberty, and the pursuit of happiness); and, in 2019 to the Natural Resources Defense Council (NRDC). In addition to his joint appointment in Environmental Studies and Sciences, as well as English, Nichols has also served terms as chair of both departments. He also worked a brief stint as Associate Dean of the College of Arts and Sciences at Dickinson.

== Recognition ==
Nichols was awarded the Ganoe Award for Inspirational Teaching (1993-1994). Speaking to his ability to reach students, this award is described as the "highest honor the college bestows on a member of the faculty for excellence in teaching"; it is given by members of the senior class and awarded each year at Commencement. He has also won the Lindback Award for Distinguished Teaching (1992-1993); selected by fellow faculty members, it recognizes superior educators in New Jersey, Pennsylvania, Maryland, Delaware, and Virginia. His most recent book, Beyond Romantic Ecocriticism: Toward Urbanatural Roosting has been widely praised, from Choice: "Combining literary, anecdotal, and philosophical perspectives, this invaluable book crossbreeds political, spiritual, scientific, and aesthetic elements within the outworn dichotomy of town and country. Summing Up: Essential" to the Sierra Club Magazine: "Both critically and artfully, Nichols explores how our conceptions of nature have derived from Enlightenment-era ideas (humans and nature are separate) and Romantic poetry (humans and nature are connected). Relying heavily on poetic examples, Nichols also envisions an 'urbanatural' future in which we see ourselves as part of the earth."; the book was released in paperback in 2012. Nichols is now at work on a follow-up to Urbanatural Roosting, titled Humanature: 21st-Century Challenges to Homo sapiens in a World of Plants and Animals.

The Teaching Company selected Nichols as one of the approximately 100 professors chosen to video and audio tape (also download) as part of their Great Courses Program; he has so far produced 24 lectures on "Emerson, Thoreau and American Transcendentalism." He was included in Who's Who in America in 2000 and Who's in the World in 2002. In recent years, he has delivered keynote speeches and lectures in countries around the world: in England, Ireland, Puerto Rico, Portugal, France, Italy, Morocco, Cameroon, India, China, and Japan.

== Research ==
His ongoing writing and research includes a website that organizes and analyzes sources of ecocriticism and natural history to explore the definition of nature. Sarah Freierman, of The New York Times, says of the project:

A Romantic Natural History, maintained by Dr. Ashton Nichols, a professor of English at Dickinson College, examines the way artists, writers and scientists viewed nature in the century before Charles Darwin published On the Origin of Species in 1859. The timeline offers wonderful juxtapositions, like the publication of Jane Austen’s "Sense and Sensibility" and the "New Idea of the Anatomy of the Brain," a paper by Charles Bell, in 1811; and the 1832 posthumous publication of "Faust, Part II," by Goethe, followed by an 1834 entry noting the invention of the first computer, an "analytical engine" by Charles Babbage.

The multidisciplinary application of Nichols' research has been praised not only by literary critics and environmentalists but also by urban planners and architects such as Charles Morris Anderson. This link between "urbanature" and architecture is evident in urban design projects such as The Olympic Sculpture Park in Seattle, WA and Project Phoenix, a soccer stadium in Haiti.

Most recently, Nichols has established a blog on urbanatural roosting. This site offers practical applications and descriptions of urbanatural roosting in cities (Boston, New York City, and Baltimore, for example) as well as in natural areas (The Adirondacks, Cape Cod, the Chesapeake Bay, and the like). These examples show how modern cities have naturalized themselves to produce sustainable forms of energy (sunlight electricity, wind energy, hydroelectric power), to grow food (greenroofs, greenwalls), and to increase the size of natural environment in urban spaces (Central Park, Boston Common, the Baltimore Inner Harbor, etc.). Likewise, the site shows how human culture and urban ideas have helped to make natural spaces more livable: strict architectural regulations in the Adirondacks and in national and state parks, careful use of roads and trails throughout natural areas nationwide, and detailed rules for living with nonhuman species in wild and wilderness areas (hunting and trapping regulations, catch-and-release fishing streams, and strict protections for even the wildest species: rattlesnakes, wolves, and grizzly bears). In addition to other nature writing—currently for the Thoreau Farm blog "The Roost" in Concord, Massachusetts—Nichols has also published poetry and short fiction.

== Personal ==
Nichols has been married since 1975 (to the calligrapher Kimberley Anne Smith), with whom he has four daughters (born 1979, 1981, 1982, 1984), five granddaughters and three grandsons.

== Published works ==
- Beyond Romantic Ecocriticism: Toward Urbanatural Roosting
- Romantic Natural Histories: William Wordsworth, Charles Darwin and Others
- The Revolutionary "I": Wordsworth and the Politics of Self-Presentation
- The Poetics of Epiphany: Nineteenth-Century Origins of the Modern Literary Moment. Tuscaloosa : University of Alabama Press, 1987.
- "Natural History," in Cambridge Critical Concepts: Nature and Literary Study. Ed. Peter Remien and Scott Slovic. Cambridge: Cambridge University Press, 2021.
- Alan Richardson and Sonia Hofkosh (eds.) Romanticism, Race, & Imperial Culture Bloomington : Indiana University Press, 1996 (essay contribution: "Mumbo Jumbo: Mungo Park and the Rhetoric of Romantic Africa")
- "Fostered by Fear: Affect and Environment in Romantic Nature Writing," Wordsworth and the Green Romantics: Affect and Ecology in the Nineteenth Century. Ed. Lisa Ottum and Seth T. Reno. Durham, N. H.: University of New Hampshire Press, 2016.
- "‘Humanist Joy’: Urbanature in the Poetry of Seamus Heaney," Festschrift for Robert Langbaum, Ed. Michael Pickard. The Wordsworth Circle (TWC), 2016.
- "Celebration or Longing: Robert Browning and the Nonhuman World," Victorian Writers and the Environment: Ecocritical Perspectives. Ed. Larry Mazzeno and Ronald D. Morrison. London: Ashgate Press, 2017.
- "Ecocriticism and Environmental Approaches," Victorian Literature in the 21st Century: A Guide to Pedagogy. Ed. Jen Cadwallader and Laurence Mazzeno. New York & London: Palgrave Macmillan, 2017.
