= Relationship between avant-garde art and American pop culture =

Ways avant-garde art and American pop culture have intertwined

Avant-garde art and American pop culture have had an intriguing relationship from the time of the art form's inception in America to the current day. The art form, which began in the early half of the nineteenth century in Europe, started to rise slowly in America under the guise of Dadaism in 1915. While originally formed under a group of artists in New York City who wanted to counter pop culture with their art, music, and literature the art form began to grow into prominence with American pop culture due to a variety of factors between the 1940s to the 1970s. However, from many factors that arose in the late 1970s, avant-garde began to both lessen in prominence and began to blend with the pop culture to the point in which most art critics considered the art form extinct.

== Avant Garde and Kitsch ==
Though his first published essays dealt mainly with literature and theatre, art still held a powerful attraction for Clement Greenberg, so in 1939, he made a sudden name as a visual art writer with possibly his most well-known and oft-quoted essay, "Avant-Garde and Kitsch", first published in the journal Partisan Review. In this Marxist-influenced essay, Greenberg claimed that true avant-garde art is a product of the Enlightenment's revolution of critical thinking, and as such resists and recoils from the degradation of culture in both mainstream capitalist and communist society, while acknowledging the paradox that, at the same time, the artist, dependent on the market or the state, remains inexorably attached "by an umbilical cord of gold". Kitsch, on the other hand, was the product of industrialization and the urbanization of the working class, a filler made for the consumption of the working class: a populace hungry for culture, but without the resources and education to enjoy cutting edge avant garde culture. Greenberg writes,

"Kitsch, using for raw material the debased and academicized simulacra of genuine culture, welcomes and cultivates this insensibility. It is the source of its profits. Kitsch is mechanical and operates by formulas. Kitsch is vicarious experience and faked sensations. Kitsch changes according to style, but remains always the same. Kitsch is the epitome of all that is spurious in the life of our times. Kitsch pretends to demand nothing of its customers except their money – not even their time."

For Greenberg, avant garde art was too "innocent" to be effectively used as propaganda or bent to a cause, while kitsch was ideal for stirring up false sentiment.

Greenberg appropriated the German word "kitsch" to describe this low, concocted form of "culture", though its connotations have since been recast to a more affirmative acceptance of nostalgic materials of capitalist/communist culture. "Avant Garde and Kitsch" is clearly a politically motivated essay, in part a response to the destruction and repression of Modernist Art in Nazi Germany and the Soviet Union, and represents a denouncement of the growing totalitarian threat in Europe and the "retrogression" of fascism.

== Further definition ==
Avant-garde, as sociologist Diana Crane states, "was an art-form that had started in Europe that had started in the early nineteenth century." While the art form has survived for this long, she states that the concept of the art form is "highly ambiguous" and it has been through many phases throughout its existence, including Dadaism, Abstract Expressionism, Minimalism, and pop art. Socially, however, each form of avant-garde is united with the idea that it is part of the definition of high culture, although this in itself is defined in a variety of fashions.

=== Ways to determine avant-garde ===
Due to the ambiguity of the term, Crane gives a few considerations on what could be considered avant-garde and what is not. She states that avant-garde can be determined in its approach to the aesthetic, through the social content of the artwork, and through the production and distribution of the artwork.

=== Aesthetics ===
Through aesthetic, a piece of artwork can be determined avant-garde if it does any of the following:

- If the artwork redefines artistic conventions.
- If it utilizes new artistic tools and techniques.
- And if it redefines the nature of the art objects.

An example of the aesthetic used in Avant-garde can include the artwork of Marcel Duchamp. For Duchamp's Fountain, he simply took a urinal and defined this as a ready-made art form. In this, he redefined artistic conventions by taking an item that was already made and employing the item for an artistic purpose. By doing this, he also employed a new technique in the production of art by taking something that was already produced and redefined the object he was using by taking a urinal and using it for art.

=== Through Social Content ===
Through social content, a piece of artwork can be determined avant-garde if it does one of the following:

- If the artwork incorporates in its artworks social or political values that are critical of or different from the majority culture.

For example, in The Art of Humanism: Art in a Time of Change, Barry Schwartz states that one of the roles of avant-garde art was to provide a counter-cultural force in the art world.

- If it redefines the relationship between high and popular culture

Like pop artists using images from advertisements and comic strips to employ a different meaning to those images

- And if it adopts a critical attitude toward artistic institutions

This is seen by the Dadaist attack on the legitimacy of art

=== Through production and distribution ===
Through its production and distribution, an artwork can be described as avant-garde if it redefines the social context for the production of art, in terms of critics, role models, and the audience; if it does one of the following:

- The artwork redefines the organizational context for the production, display, and distribution of art

A good example of this is the usage of alternative spaces in order to make the art appear unsellable.

- The artwork redefines the nature of the artistic role or the extent to which the artist participates in other social institutions, which provides a good niche of avant-garde artists in the middle class.

=== Differences with Post-Modernism ===
While the two terms are used interchangeably today, some argue that the difference between the two lie in their approach to innovating art. According to Jochen Schulte-Sasse, the two differ in the fact that Post-modernism wants to destroy old conceptions of art to replace them with new (without any reference to the social impact of the art). According to Diana Crane, post-modernists do this through a variety of ways, namely through creating effects of polysemy, ambiguity, and parody. Post-modernists also only focused on the technique of their art rather than the social impacts of their art. However, avant-garde wants to innovate art and also communicate social issues within it. It could also be defined that post-modernism uses their art with the intent to shock the person viewing the art while avant-garde, while it also often shocks the viewer, uses their art to communicate a message through the art while also using the art to shock the viewer.

== Subgenres of the avant-garde ==
While avant-garde is a solitary art form, it has had a variety of subgenres attached to the art form throughout its history, with each communicating their own distinct messages. Some of them, like Dadaism and Pop Art, use the art to provide a social commentary. Others, like Abstract Expressionism, use outer-worldly figures and colors to evoke an emotional response. Finally, there are some like Minimalism which use their art for the sake of making art without any emotional or social meanings behind them. While there are myriad different avant-garde subgenres that came about during its popularity in America, the four subgenres that played the biggest roles in American Popular Culture are Dadaism, Abstract Expressionism, Minimalism, and Pop Art.

=== Dadaism ===
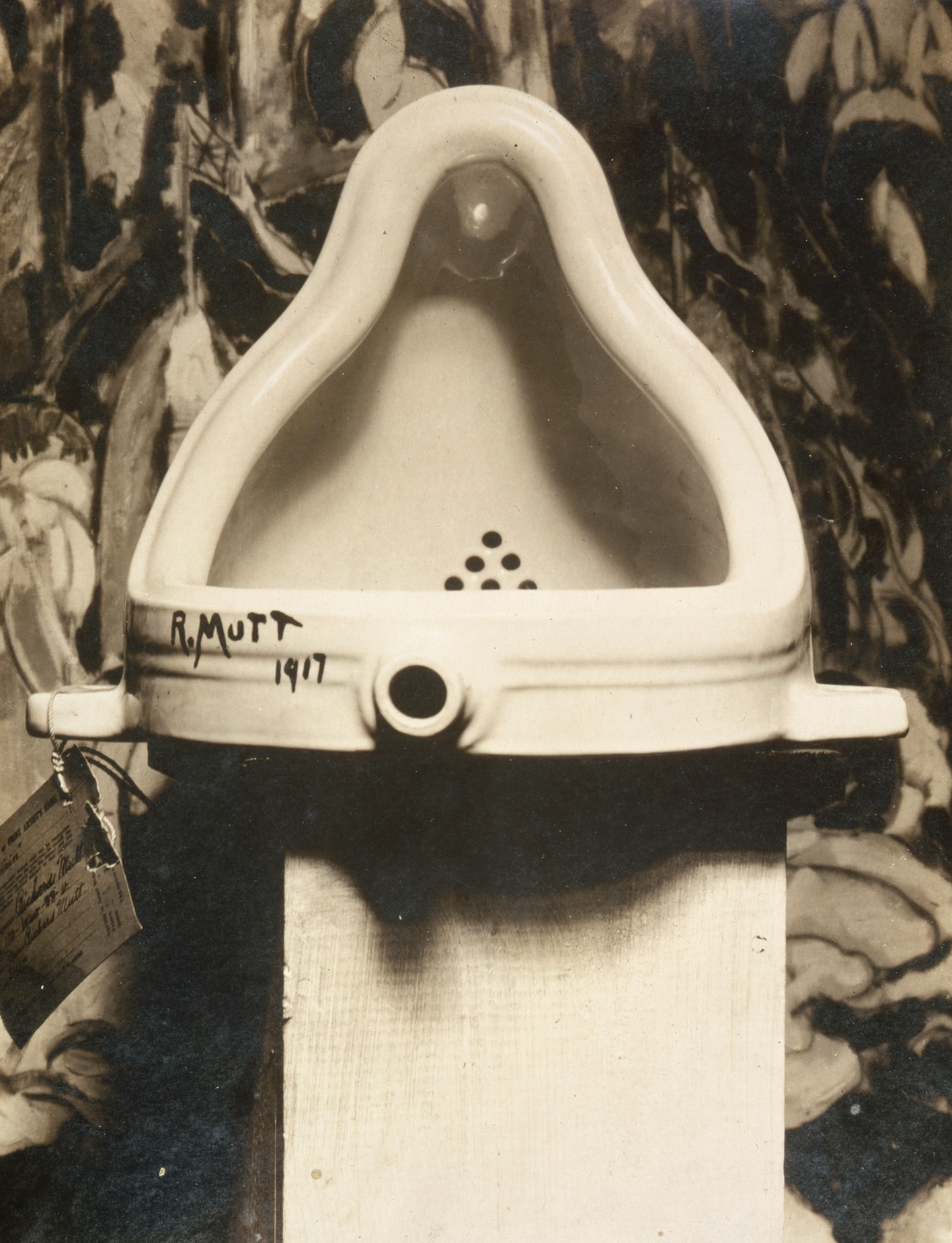
Marcel Duchamp's Fountain is an example of Dadaist Ready-Mades

Dadaism was the first major subgenre of avant-garde art to cross over into America. Dadaist artists, in many ways, wanted to contrast from the typical artist at the time from their idea of being against typical artistic conventions at the time and being anti-art. A good example of their anti-art approach came through what Dadaists call the "ready-mades," the most notable being Marcel Duchamp's Fountain, which was a porcelain urinal. Ready-mades such as this caused great debate in the art community concerning the definition of art and how Dadaists should play in this definition.

==== Commonalities Between Pieces ====
While Dadaist pieces cannot be determined through a particular artistic form, many Dadaist artists collaborated in groups with each other in order to create their art, united on either to create art based on social issues (particularly in Europe) or to mock the art world in general (mostly in America). In America, the center of this movement came from two locations in the New York-area: at Alfred Stieglitz's New York gallery "291," and at the studio of Walter Arensberg. In addition to group collaboration, artists of the Dada movement depended more on spontaneity and chance than following other established artists. They focused on rejecting the ideas formed by established artists and art creation and used methods such as collage, photomontage, and found-object construction to create their art. While this art form started strong in 1916 in Germany, it eventually faded out by 1922 in both Europe and America. However, despite its decline, Dada would play a major influence on other avant-garde and nihilistic art-forms in the future, including the Punk movement in the '1970s.

=== Abstract Expressionism ===
Abstract Expressionism was another major avant-garde genre that, unlike Dadaism, was born in and popular in the United States. A number of artists that were practitioners of this art form include Jackson Pollock, Willem de Kooning, Franz Kline, and Mark Rothko. Much like Dadaism in America, the center of the movement was in New York City.

==== Commonalities ====
Also, much like Dadaism, although many of the artists worked together in creating their art, the art pieces cannot be determined through one particular art form. Pieces often varied differently between painting styles from both the techniques that were used in the piece and quality of expression of the pieces. Despite the drastic differences between pieces, Abstract Expressionism shares several broad characteristics. These characteristics includes:

- Each piece depicts forms that are not found in the visible world
- Each emphasize free, spontaneous, and personal emotional expressionism
- They exercise a freedom of technique with emphasis on exploitation of the physical character of the paint to evoke expressive qualities (violence, lyricism, etc.)
- They show similar emphasis on the unstudied and intuitive application of that paint in a form of psychic improvisation akin to the automatism of the Surrealists, with a similar intent of expressing the force of the creative unconscious in art.
- They display the abandonment of conventionally structured composition built up out of discrete and segregable elements and their replacement with a single unified, undifferentiated field, network, or other image that exists in unstructured space.
- Finally, the paintings fill large canvases to give these aforementioned visual effects both monumentality and engrossing power.

There are also three main techniques in which categorize Abstract Expressionism. First, there is Action Painting, which is characterized by a loose, rapid, dynamic, or forceful handling of paint in sweeping or slashing brush strokes and in techniques partially dictated by chance, such as dripping or spilling the paint directly onto the canvas. Examples of this include Jackson Pollock dripping commercial paints on raw canvas to build up complex and tangled skeins of paint into exciting and suggestive linear patterns and Willem de Kooning used extremely vigorous and expressive brush strokes to build up richly colored and textured images. The second category of Abstract Expressionism is represented by a variety of styles ranging from Color field, to Lyrical abstraction; delicate imagery and fluid shapes and fields of color included in works by Clyfford Still, Philip Guston, and Helen Frankenthaler to the more clearly structured, forceful, almost calligraphic pictures of Robert Motherwell and Adolph Gottlieb. Finally, the last form of Abstract Expressionism is the third and least emotionally expressive approach was that of Rothko, Barnett Newman, and Ad Reinhardt. These painters used large areas, or fields, of flat colour and thin, diaphanous paint to achieve quiet, subtle, almost meditative effects. While Abstract Expressionism's roots could be traced back as far as 1919, the peak of its popularity were in the 1950s to the 1960s. This, like Dadaism before, shows another influential avant-garde artistic genre that suffered from a short peak of popularity.

=== Minimalism ===
Minimalism was an avant-garde genre from the 1910s to the late 1960s which was characterized by extreme simplicity of a form and a literal approach. Its origins could be stemmed from many artists, including Kandinsky, Picabia, Delaunay, Kupka, Survage and Malevich, who focused on reducing art to its basic element. A great example of his art was the painting of a black square on a white ground. Other minimalist artists that were famous at this time included painters such as Jack Youngerman, Ellsworth Kelly, Frank Stella, Kenneth Noland, Al Held, and Gene Davis and sculptors such as Donald Judd, Carl Andre, Dan Flavin, Tony Smith, Anthony Caro, and Sol LeWitt.

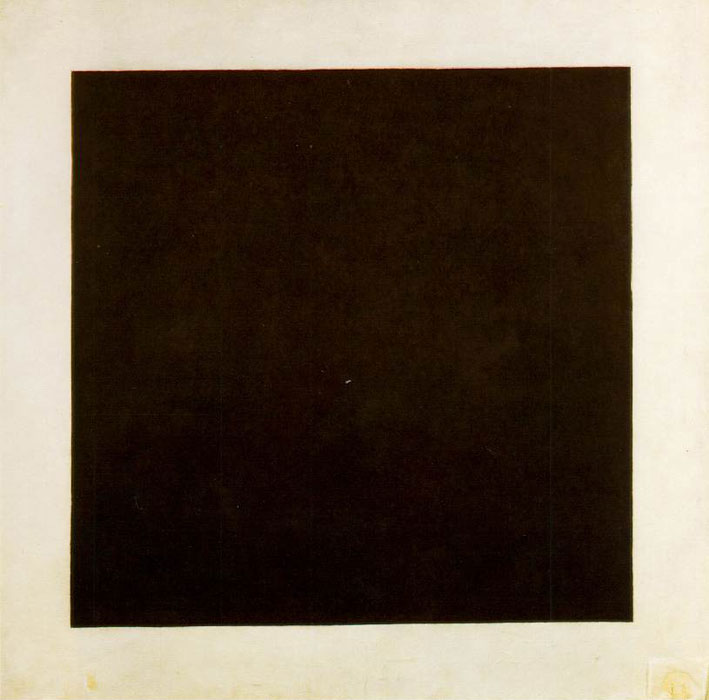
Kazimir Malevich, Black Square, 1923, oil on canvas, State Russian Museum, St.Petersburg

In many ways the rise of Minimalism came as a result of those who were dissatisfied with the Abstract Expressionist movement, primarily from the Action Paintings of the movement. The reason for many was that they believed that Action painting was too personal and insubstantial, and they adopted the point of view that a work of art should not refer to anything other than itself.

==== Similarities ====
Unlike other genres of avant-garde at the time, minimalist art used not only a set of philosophical properties when it came to the production of their In order to rid their art of any extra-visual influence, Minimalist paintings used hard edge painting, a simplistic form, and a linear approach to emphasize two-dimensionality and to allow the viewer an immediate, purely visual response to art in comparison to any other sort of response.

=== Hard-Edge Painting ===
Hard-edge painting is characterized by large, simplified, usually geometric forms on an overall flat surface; precise, razor-sharp contours; and broad areas of bright, unmodulated color that have been stained into unprimed canvas. It differs from other types of geometric abstraction in that it rejects both lyrical and mathematical composition because, even in this simplified field, they are a means of personal expression for the artist. Minimal hard-edge painting is the anonymous construction of a simple object.

==== Similarities between Minimalist Sculpture ====
Much like minimalist painting, minimalist sculpture used extremely simple, monumental geometric forms made of fiberglass, plastic, sheet metal, or aluminum, either left raw or solidly painted with bright industrial color in order to convey the art for the usage of the visual response without allowing the art to create responses elsewhere. An example of Minimalist Sculpture is "Free Ride" by Tony Smith, which is a black geometrical structure the size of a door opening on a white background.

=== Pop Art ===
One of the last major avant-garde artforms that proved to be very influential to the American pop culture was Pop Art. This art form had much of its roots in Great Britain in the early 1950s, but made its way into the American culture by the late 1950s and remained a popular art form in America from the 1960s. Some of the famous practitioners of this era include Andy Warhol, Roy Lichtenstein, and Claes Oldenburg.

==== Similarities ====
Pop art, also like minimalism, has clear commonalities between their pieces. Primarily, each piece uses commonplace items (comic strips, soup cans, road signs, and hamburgers) as the subject matter of their pieces. They emphatically present any iconography that has created a major impact on contemporary life without praise or condemnation but with overwhelming immediacy, and by means of the precise commercial techniques used by the media from which the iconography itself was borrowed. It was also an attempt to return to a more objective, universally acceptable form of art after the dominance in both the United States and Europe of the highly personal Abstract Expressionism. It was also iconoclastic, rejecting both the supremacy of the "high art" of the past and the pretensions of other contemporary avant-garde art. Pop art became a cultural event because of its close reflection of a particular social situation and because its easily comprehensible images were immediately exploited by the mass media. Despite its opposition to other avant-garde art forms at its time, Pop art was a derivative of Dada, especially praising the art of Marcel Duchamp, who with his "ready-mades" also praised many objects and imagery of American pop culture.

== Relationship Before the 1940s ==
Before World War II there were some significant artists and art movements in the United States, but, according to sociologist Diana Crane, these art movements never were directly inspired by art movements from Europe. However, due to the numbers of immigrants from Europe who were involved with the avant-garde movement in Europe, Dadaist artists from Europe like Marcel Duchamp moved to America carrying their avant-garde ideals with them. Once they arrived in New York City, many of these Dadaists decided to collaborate, making art to display to the public.

Initially, while the Dadaists brought some attention to the New York art scene, they had very little attention outside of it. Some factors that played to the lack of attention of the Dadaists at the time included the lack of museums throughout the United States and the lack of funding to the artists who created and advertised the art.

=== Origins of European avant-garde ===
According to Peter Bürger, some of the theories involving aesthetics can come all the way back to the writings of Karl Marx. According to Bürger, " For Marx, this development is not merely one in economic theory. Rather, he feels that the possibility of a progress in knowledge is a function of the development of the object toward which insight directs itself ... Marx demonstrates through the example of the category of labor also applies to objectifications in the arts ... it is only with aestheticism that the full unfolding of the phenomenon of art became a fact, and it is to aestheticism that the historical avant-garde movements respond".

Besides from the idea of Karl Marx's influence over the avant-garde movement, much of the movement came through social commentary from the wars that were fought during the time of its rise. Dadaism, for instance, was seized upon by the group as appropriate for their anti-aesthetic creations and protest activities, which were engendered by disgust for bourgeois values and despair over World War I. Another example of this is John Hartfield's usage of photomontage to express his anti-Nazi views.

=== Relationship between the 1950s and 1980s ===
As previously stated, as soon as many of the Dadaist movement from Europe immigrated over to the United States in the 1920s, they started making their art and presenting the art to the people of New York. Although it didn't initially take off, by the 1950s, their art and the art from artists that were inspired by these individuals began to rise in popularity.

There were a number of factors that lead to the rise of avant-garde art in the eyes of the American Popular Culture. First of all, due to the rise of the American Economy after World War II, the American Government focused on enhancing the importance of the Fine Arts. To do so, congress passed bills in which expanded the number of museums around the nation and funded the government to allow the artists to produce more art.

=== Increasing the Museums ===
Before the 1940s, Americans in many regions were unaware to the existence of avant-garde art because, according to Dore Ashton, "Although culture ... had penetrated the hinterland in the form of public libraries, literary societies, and even music circles, the plastic arts had ... lagged far behind" In order to increase the interest of the arts among the people and to allow them to be up-to-date with the rest of the world at that time, they decided to increase the number of museums in America from the 1940s to the 1980s.

=== Government Funding the Artist ===
Along with the construction of museums, the Federal Government also realized that, to increase the interest of the people, there needed to be more art available. In addition to this, if the artists were to do so, they would need to form communities in which the artists could gather to produce their art. According to Sharon Zukin, "... real-estate developers profited from the increase in property values that resulted from the creation of an artistic community in Manhattan's SoHo district while political leaders benefited from the creation of a large pool of arts-related jobs." Another reason the Federal Government felt a need to fund the artists at this time was to increase the patriotism of the people. If there was art depicting how grand, majestic, and free the United States of America is, they felt this would increase Patriotism among the people so the people would be willing to agree with whatever the government had to offer. According to Sharon Zukin, "The willingness of federal and state governments to fund art and artists were political interests that used traveling exhibitions as propaganda for the American way of life.

=== The influence of early avant-garde on later avant-garde ===
When looking at all of the major movements of avant-garde that were influential from this time period, almost all of these art forms trace back to earlier avant-garde art forms, namely Dadaism. For instance, in practice, Abstract Expressionism was influenced by Dada by the fact that the art form had its similarities not in the way that the art was constructed, but rather from the concept that the genres exemplify. Pop Art also marks its influences from Dada because, like the "ready-mades" which used commonplace items in a way that they were not originally intended. For the case of Dada, the "ready-mades" consisted of items such as toilets as art. For the case of pop art, it could have been anything that proved influential in popular culture, whether it be comic strips, soup cans, or magazine advertisements.

Another example of how an earlier avant-garde genre influenced a later genre was the example of Dada's influence of Punk fashion in the 1970s. Much like how the Dadaists used their art to reflect the ideal of the belief in nothing and the wish to become nothing through their art (as they often referred it as anti-art), the Punk culture used the same ideals for their fashion and their music (by describing their music as anti-music). In addition to the two matching the same ideal, both used their mediums to reflect the same approach: to shock the community through their art and to speak a political, often Marxist, message through their works.

=== Relationship Between high culture and popular culture ===
Stemming from its Dadaist beginnings, avant-garde was a movement that served as a contrast from typical Popular Culture. Under the guise of Dada, it started in Europe as a way to display their anti-art rhetoric as well as to communicate to the public their disgust for bourgeois values and their disapproval of World War I. In America, while the art was not much about protesting bourgeois values and the war, it still served as a way to protest against typical art values as well as to establish the high, artistic culture to contrast American popular culture.

Similarly, Abstract Expressionist and Minimalist art also served as a way to contrast popular culture. In Abstract Expressionist art, the approach to contrast from the depiction of real-world qualities by creating art using forms that do not exist in the real world. In Minimalist art, the approach was to contrast from the complicated works of the time, including those of fellow avant-garde genre Abstract Expressionism. Through this, the artist created their art with the sole intent of making art; not with a complicated political statement, not with a cultural reference, etc. It solely was art for art itself.

However, Pop art and its practitioners, while continuing to do some contrast between high culture and popular culture, began to blur the two by using elements of popular culture and transforming those images in a way which were not the original intent of those elements, much like the ready-mades of the Dadaist artists before them. It sometimes came through subverting the images coloration, such as what Andy Warhol did with pictures of soup cans and actress Marilyn Monroe. In other times, it came through taking a comic strip out of its initial context and using that for a piece. However, despite trying to contrast the two, at many times many of the artists became celebrities in popular culture while practicing their contrast between that and the High Culture.

== Avant-garde's demise ==
After the end of the Pop Art movement, many art critics began to question the rising generation of artists who were influenced by the Pop artists shortly before, even to the point that some considered avant-garde dead. There are various reasons, but three primary indications for its demise are:

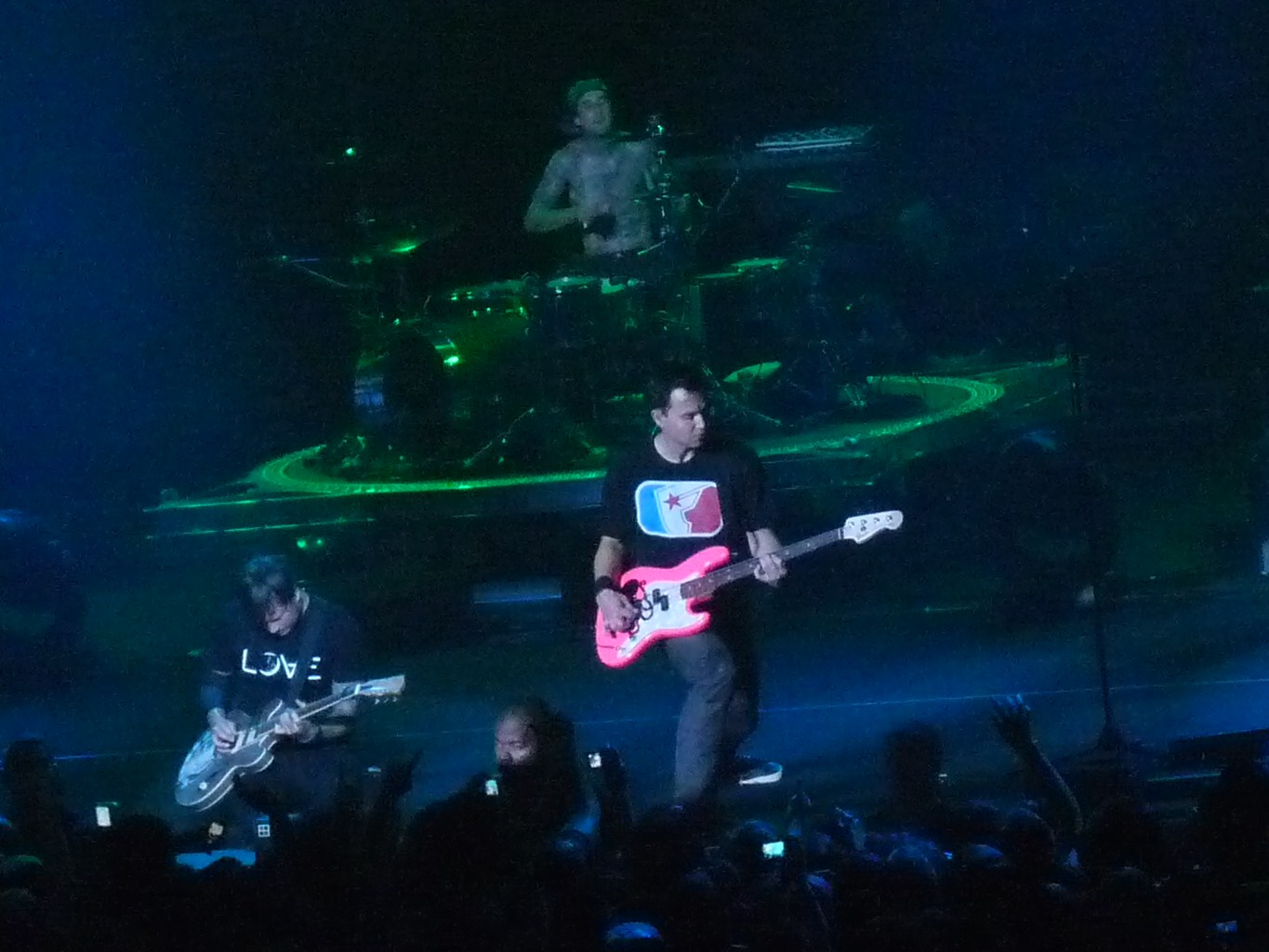
Blink-182 performing live in 2009.

1. In their beginnings, the pop artists made a distinction between American Pop Culture and High Culture by changing the intent on items that provided a major impact on American society. However, as time went on, many of these same artists whose goals were to subvert well-known icons to fit their art became celebrities themselves. As a result, since many avant-garde artists who supported the High Culture began to be well known in Popular culture, the differences between the two cultures were becoming less distinguishable as time went on.
2. By the time the 1990s approached, the Punk movement began to be part of the American culture. Indications of this transition include the rise of punk-inspired grunge music provided by bands like Nirvana and the rise of pop-punk bands such as Green Day and Blink 182. As punk music began to increase in popularity by this time, the lyrics, fashion, and the music itself began to be saturated by Popular Culture until the point where most of its avant-garde influence seemed to be transparent.
3. With the definition of high culture more vague than it was back in its inception, many artists attempted to create art that seemed similar to avant-garde, but rather than focusing on building up the High Culture, the art was rather made to create shock and to create art of the future. Such art that focused on shock and not about the social impact of the art were considered by art critics to be beginnings of Post-modernism.

== See also ==
- Anti-art
- Bauhaus
- Experimental film
- Experimental literature
- Experimental music
- Experimental theatre
- List of avant-garde artists
- Outsider art
- Russian avant-garde
- Vanguardism

== Bibliography ==
- Crane, Diana (1987). The Transformation of the Avant Garde: The New York Art World. University of Chicago.
- Bürger, Peter (1984). The Theory of the Avant-Garde. University of Minnesota.
- Crane, Diana (1997). Postmodernism and the Avant-Garde: Stylistic Change in Fashion Design. Modernism/Modernity 4.3. pp. 123–140
- Marcus, Greil (1989). Lipstick Traces: a Secret History of the Twentieth Century Harvard University Press.
- Ashton, Dore (1973). The New York School: A Cultural Reckoning. Viking.
- Zukin, Sharon (1982). Loft Living: Culture and Capital in Urban Change. Johns Hopkins University Press.
