= Negative planning =

'Negative Approach to Urban Planning', also known as "reversed planning" or simply "negative planning", is a landscape urbanism approach to urban planning. It is a new concept and terminology introduced by Chinese landscape architect, Professor of Peking University YU Kongjian. Yu argued that among other issues, the degrading environmental and ecological situations, low performance scrambled city form, and the loss of cultural identity in Beijing have proved that the conventional "population projection-urban infrastructure-land use" approach and the architectural urbanism approach to urban growth planning failed to meet the challenges of swift urbanisation and sustainability issues in China in general, and Beijing in particular. The negative approach defines an urban growth and urban form based on Ecological Infrastructure (EI). This approach has evolved from the pre-scientific model of Feng-shui as the sacred landscape setting for human settlement, the nineteenth century notion of greenways as urban recreational infrastructure, the early twentieth century idea of green belts as urban form makers, and the late twentieth century notion of ecological networks and EI as a biological preservation framework. EI is composed of critical landscape elements and structure that are strategically identified as Landscape Security Patterns to safeguard natural assets and ecosystems services, essential for sustaining human society. EI is strategically planned and developed using less land but more efficiently preserving the Ecosystem service. It distinguishes itself from other theories as it is practical way of solving urban and rural planning problems in quickly developing regions.

== Background ==
The negative approach is proposed by Yu in the degrading ecological background and chaos of city planning in China, especially big cities. This approach argues that when it comes to dealing with issues brought up by rapid urban development, the conventional "population speculation–land use–infrastructure layout" approach "has been proven invalid" and responsible for the "chaotic situation and degrading ecological conditions" and "loss of cultural and spiritual landscape" in Chinese cities like Beijing and Shenzhen. So Yu raises an ecological planning methodology which gives priority to planning of EI (ecological infrastructure), and tries to "provide land use and urban planning with a solid ecological basis".

== Theory ==
The negative approach is based on both eastern and western ecological planning theories, especially the McHarg's theory of Design with Nature and Landscape Urbanism. The Landscape Urbanism takes landscape rather than architecture as the "basic building block or urbanism". It can be understood as the contrary of Architecture Urbanism, which uses buildings, road networks and other constructions to define urban forms. Yu said in an interview during the 2009 China Landscape Architecture Education Conference & Landscape Architects Conference that he considers the negative approach "the Chinese version of Landscape Urbanism". The negative approach mainly focuses on landscape as its operation field, meaning to use landscape, rather than the architectures or other constructions as the infrastructure to shape urban form. The key for negative approach is planning in Ecological Infrastructure.

== Objective ==
Facing the challenges in today's Chinese urban planning, Yu discusses about the ethic of land use in China and referred the land as Chinese gods, he argues that we should "go back to earth" and let the "god of earth" come back to life in his book Negative Planning Method. He points out that the core of planning in Chinese cities should be sustainability for development on limited land. And this is what negative planning should care about. Its purpose is to develop land while maintaining the ecological integrity and cultural identity, to shape landscape form and urban form in a sustainable way. "The overall objectives are smart preservation and smart growth."

== Method ==
To accomplish these goals, negative approach consists of the following steps:

1. 1) Process analysis: Using software and tools like GIS to systematically analyze landscapes for ecosystem functions or services which are targeted to be safeguarded by EI. This step includes: Abiotic processes, Biotic processes and Cultural processes.
1. 2) Defining landscape SPs: SP refers to Landscape Security Patterns that are composed of strategic portions and positions of the landscape that have critical significance in safeguarding and controlling certain ecological processes. Components of security patterns have the quality of initiative, coordination and efficiency, and are, therefore, strategically important in landscape change.
1. 3) Defining EI: The SPs are integrated by overlaying techniques to form comprehensive Ecological Infrastructure at variety levels: high, medium, low.
1. 4) Defining urban form: In this step, we can develop scenarios of regional urban growth patterns by "using the multiple EI alternatives as framing structures". The decision makers of the city now can evaluate from economical, ecological and social aspects and pick from the scenarios.

== Significant Cases ==
1. 1) The Growth Pattern of Taizhou City Based on Ecological Infrastructure, Taizhou City, Zhejiang Province, China, by YU Kongjian, LI Dihua, LIU Hailong, CHENG Jin. 2005 ASLA (American Society of Landscape Architecture) Honor Award, Planning and Analysis winner.
2. 2) The negative approach to urban growth planning of Beijing, China, by YU Kongjian, WANG Sisi, LI Dihua.

== See also ==
- Urban planning
- Landscape planning
- Landscape urbanism
