= Landscape urbanism =

Theory of urban design

Landscape urbanism is a theory of urban design arguing that the city is constructed of interconnected and ecologically rich horizontal field conditions, rather than the arrangement of objects and buildings. Landscape Urbanism, like Infrastructural Urbanism and Ecological Urbanism, emphasizes performance over pure aesthetics and utilizes systems-based thinking and design strategies. The phrase 'landscape urbanism' first appeared in the mid 1990s. Since this time, the phrase 'landscape urbanism' has taken on many different uses, but is most often cited as a postmodernist or post-postmodernist response to the "failings" of New Urbanism and the shift away from the comprehensive visions, and demands, for modern architecture and urban planning.

The phrase 'landscape urbanism' first appeared in the work of Peter Connolly, a student from the Royal Melbourne Institute of Technology (RMIT University) in the title of his 1994 Masters of Urban Design proposal. Here, he suggested that 'a language of "landscape urbanism" barely exists and needs articulating', and that 'existing urbanisms ... are limited in the exploration of the landscape'. He also used the term 'landscape as urbanism' in his 1994 essay, '101 Ideas About Big Parks'. In 1996 Tom Turner wrote that

The city of the future will be an infinite series of landscapes: psychological and physical, urban and rural, flowing apart and together. They will be mapped and planned for special purposes, with the results recorded in geographical information systems (GIS), which have the power to construct and retrieve innumerable plans, images and other records. Christopher Alexander was right: a city is not a tree. It is a landscape.

In the late 1990s, concepts of 'landscape urbanism' were often used by landscape architects in the United States in the reorganization of declining post-industrial cities, such as Detroit. From the 2000s, it was used in Europe by architects to mean a highly flexible way of integrating large-scale infrastructure, housing and open space. By the late 2000s, the phrase became associated with highly commercialized, multi-phase urban parks, such as Olympic park design. Landscape urbanism strategies in the U.S. are now widely used in waterfront redevelopment, recapturing urban vacancy, urban agriculture, and green infrastructure. LU, EU, and IU strategies are rising in importance with growing concerns over climate change.

== History ==
The first major event to frame practices of 'landscape urbanism' was the Landscape Urbanism conference and exhibition curated by Charles Waldheim in Chicago in April 1997. The conference was sponsored by the Graham Foundation and speakers included Charles Waldheim, who curated the exhib Mohsen Mostafavi, James Corner of James Corner/Field Operations, Alex Wall, and Adriaan Geuze of the firm West 8, among others. The formative period of Landscape Urbanism can be traced back to RMIT University and University of Pennsylvania in the late 1980s, at a time when Peter Connolly, Richard Weller, Ann Spirn, James Corner, Mohsen Mostafavi, and others were exploring the artificial boundaries of landscape architecture, urban design, and architecture, searching for better ways to deal with complex urban projects. Their texts cite and synthesize the ideas of influential modernist methods, programs and manifestoes that appeared in the early twentieth century, rediscover the methodologies of seminal landscape architects and planners Frederick L. Olmsted and Ian McHarg, ad build on the work of contemporary architects of the time such as OMA-Rem Koolhaas and Bernard Tschumi. Charles Waldheim, Anu Mathur, Alan Berger, Chris Reed, among others, were students at the University of Pennsylvania during this formative period for Landscape Urbanism. After the Chicago conference, European design schools and North American design institutions formed academic programs and began to formalize a field of Landscape Urbanism studies, including the University of Toronto, Harvard Graduate School of Design, Oslo School of Architecture Urbanism and landscape, Massachusetts Institute of Technology Landscape+Urbanism at MIT, Catholic University in Leuven, Belgium Landscape Urbanism – KU Leuven, the University of Illinois at Chicago and London's Architectural Association.

The development of an operative response to the broad and often vague concepts surrounding landscape urbanism was largely developed at the Architectural Association in London. Prior to this period of design exploration, landscape urbanism had never been clearly developed as an actual design practice. Today, much of the design culture that has come to be associated with landscape urbanism was initiated and developed in the AA Landscape Urbanism program during its early formative period and its influence persists in many educational institutions. A number of practices that have chosen to adopt the design and conceptual approach towards urbanism have also adopted many of these design strategies.

=== Landscape Urbanism and New Urbanism ===
Both the theories of Landscape Urbanism and New Urbanism emerged as responses to modernist architecture and planning practices. Both intended to address the rigidity of the existing urban form as well as the lack of environmental consciousness informing urban design. New Urbanists prioritize interconnectedness of the neighborhood through well-defined streets that generate walkability. Landscape Urbanists place the importance of urban order on a “thin horizontal vegetal plane”, using the concept of green-space as the base for urban planning as opposed to the streetscape. In this way, Landscape Urbanists wish to circumvent the inflexibility and “uninspired failings” of postmodern urban planning practices. At its core, the theory of Landscape Urbanism addresses problems of urban sprawl, de-densification, and environmental change in what is referred to as “a disciplinary realignment… in which landscape is usurping architecture’s historical role as the basic building block of city making”. It is primarily this principle that is debated between New Urbanists and Landscape Urbanists.

== Themes ==
James Corner is the author of an essay entitled "Terra Fluxus." He has identified four general ideas that are important for use in Landscape Urbanism. They are as follows:

1. Process over time – Understanding the fluid or changing nature of any environment and the processes that affect change over time. A respect for natural processes (Ecology) – the idea that our lives intertwine with the environment around us, and we should therefore respect this when creating an urban environment. Landscape Urbanism is concerned with a working surface over time – a type of urbanism that anticipates change, open endedness and negotiation.
2. Horizontality – The use of horizontal alignment in landscaping, rather than relying on vertical structuring.
3. Working Methods /Techniques – Those who practice the idea of landscape urbanism should be able to adapt their techniques to the environment that they are in.
4. The imaginary – That in many ways the failing of twentieth century planning can be attributed to the absolute impoverishment of the imagination to extend new relationships and sets of possibilities.

== Ten characteristics ==
Tom Turner summarized the ten characteristics of landscape urbanism in the book Landscape design history and theory: landscape architecture and garden design origins:

1. Broad scale context: Landscape urbanism does not belong to a specific scale. It can be considered in small or large-scale projects.
2. Landscape is a context which contains architecture and civil engineering.
3. Landscape is seen as a third machinery arm that makes a connection between its components. Mohsen Mostafavi, the author of Landscape Urbanism : A Manual for the Machinic Landscape used the same phrase.
4. LU projects can provide the opportunity of increasing the social interactions. Also, Emily Talen, one of the writers of Landscape Urbanism and its Discontents talks about social aspects of a LU project "by forming three theoretical alliances: one with post-structuralism, one with ecology, and one --peculiarly-- with Marxism."
5. Function is the most significant concern in LU machine, which gives the appearance of a project less importance.
6. LU discovers the potentials and opportunities in landscapes.
7. The infrastructure are highlighted in LU projects.
8. LU projects will develop the interrelationship between natural and engineered systems.
9. LU will break the boundary between the landscape and the city and will organize them as one.
10. The answer to the projects which are complex or have ecological concentrations, is landscape urbanism
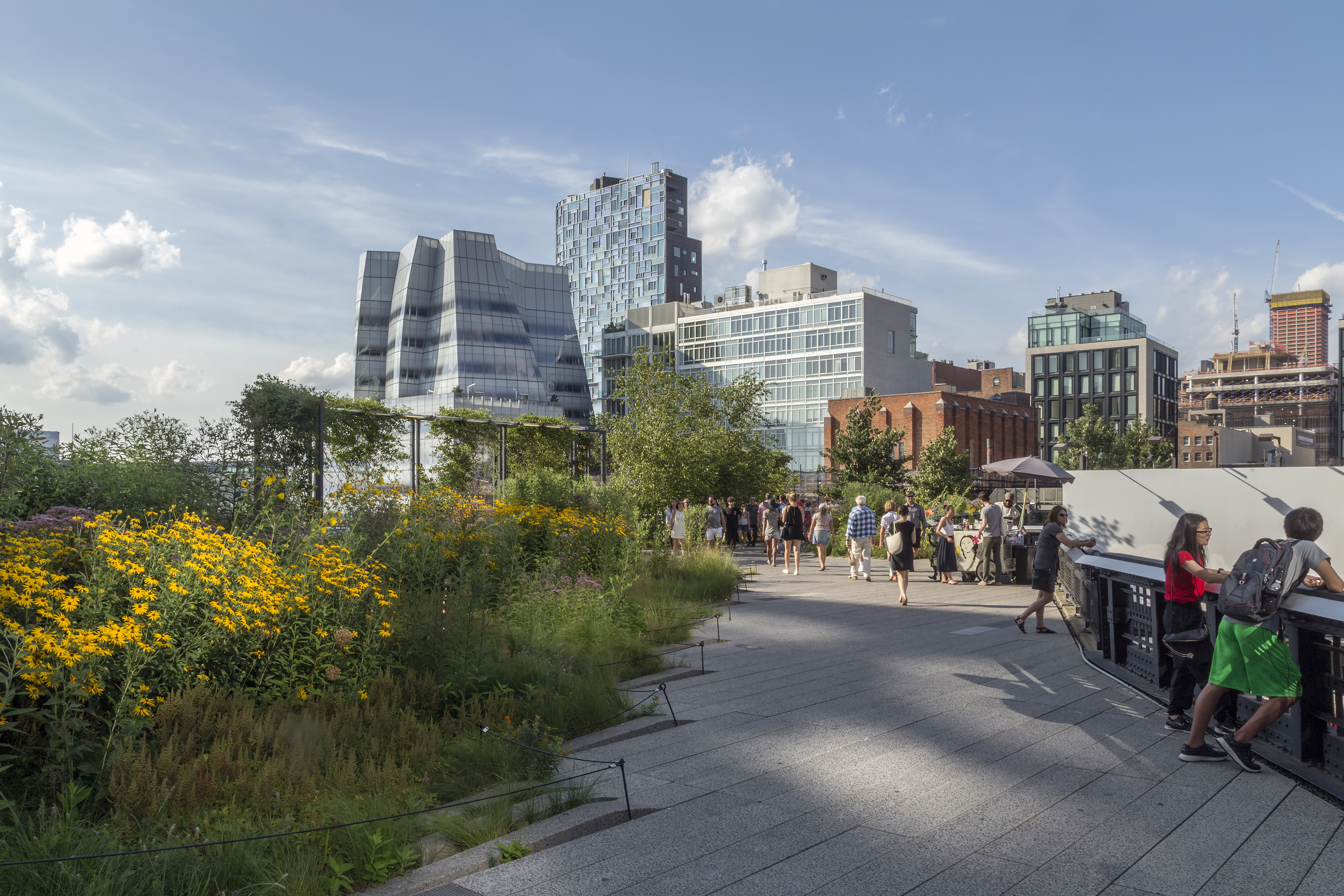
  The High Line by James Corner/Field Operations.

== Projects ==
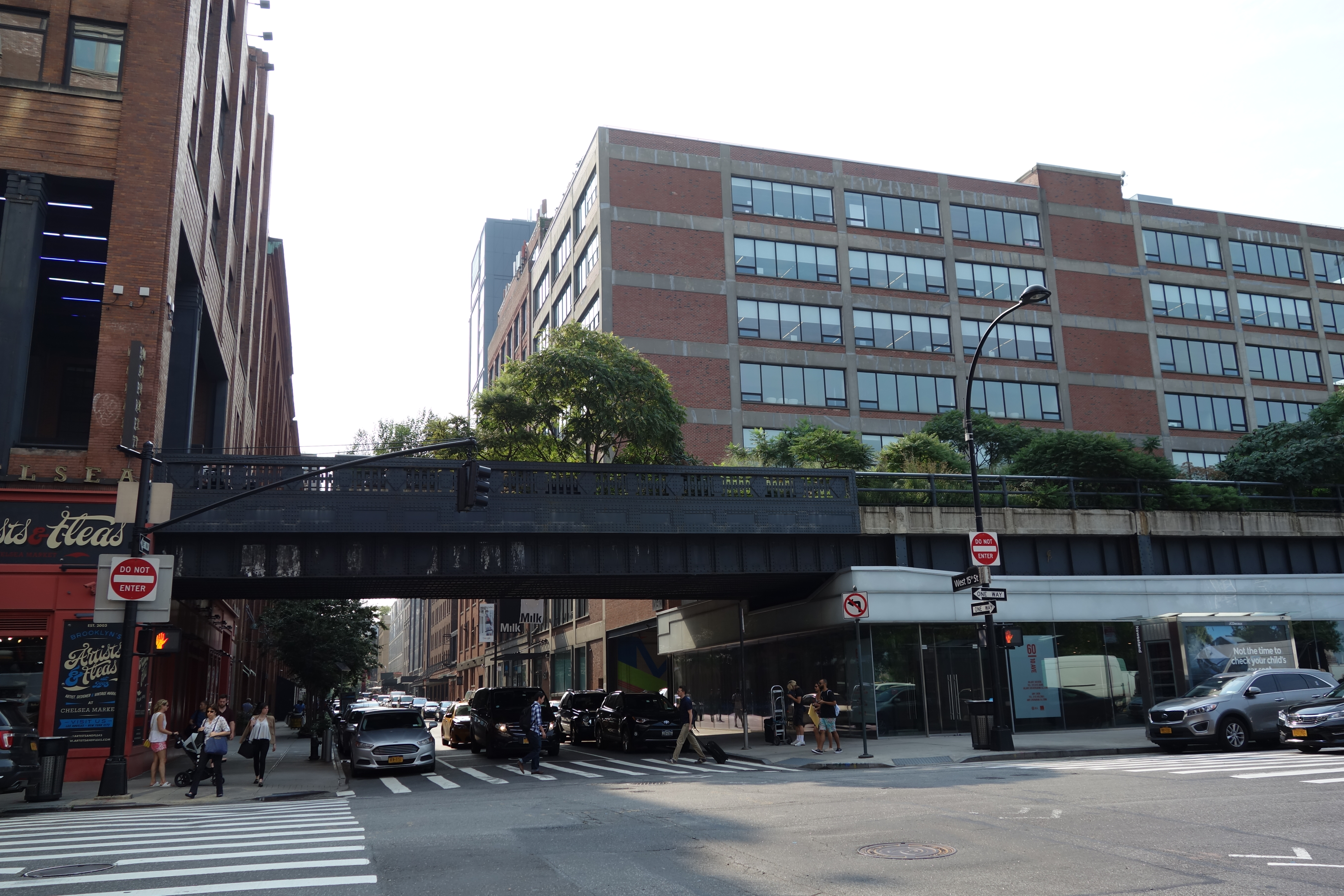
Street view of the High Line from 15th Street and 10th Avenue in Chelsea, Manhattan.

The following are Landscape Urbanism projects that can provide more information about the theory in practice:

- Parc de la Villette, Bernard Tschumi
- Millenium Park, SOM (Park Masterplan)
- Olympic Sculpture Park, Weiss/Manfredi
- Klyde Warren Park, The Office of James Burnett
- Madrid Rio, Ginés Garrido [Director] Burgos & Garrido / Porras La Casta / Rubio A.Sala / West 8
- Fresh Kills Landfill Competition, James Corner and Stan Allen Field Operations/James Corner Field Operations – home
- The High Line, Field Operations/James Corner
- Downsview Park Competition, all finalist entries ::Parc Downsview Park: The Finalists::
- Schouwburgplein, Rotterdam, West 8/Adriaan Geuze
- Projects by Stoss/Chris Reed Stoss Landscape Urbanism

== Criticism ==
Landscape Urbanism has been criticized for being only a loosely defined idea that influences flashy projects. These have been decried as expensive schemes with a commercial and aesthetic purpose that satisfy a local ambition to invest in ecology or sustainability without posing a more globally applicable approach. Some believe that these projects pander to elite patrons and academics invested in design competitions, instead of accomplishing meaningful objectives. It is recognized by many professionals that environmental, spatial, and social justice are considerations in the design of the contemporary landscape. However, critics question the extent to which Landscape Urbanism has effectively championed the principles of equity, or if its projects have contributed more to the displacement of people in low-income and marginalized groups. People debate who is truly best served by Landscape Urbanism.

Critics also see Landscape Urbanism as falling short of a true merger of the fields of landscape architecture and Urban Ecology. From this criticism American ecologist and landscape architect Frederick Steiner introduced the theory of “landscape ecological urbanism” as an approach to better include the field of urban ecology in city planning. Others have emphasized that in order to develop a new urban ecology, this type of integrative planning and management of cities should be reliant on intensive analysis of nature in an urban environment.

An opponent to Landscape Urbanism is New Urbanism, led by Andres Duany, which promotes walkable communities and smart growth with its Transit Oriented Development (TOD) and Traditional Neighborhood Design (TND). In response to landscape urbanism’s focus on expansive green space in urban development, Duany stated that “density and urbanism are not the same.” Further, “unless there is tremendous density, human beings will not walk.” The result is patches of green sprawl that lose connectivity to the greater network.

Emo Urbanism is another philosophy critical of Landscape Urbanism. The movement contends that Landscape Urbanism views ecology as an aesthetic element of style and not urban ecology. The artificial ecology replaces the entropic state to re-create a landscape that fits a particular brand or aesthetic. The loss is a dynamic, adaptive, and certainly essential urban system. Emo urbanism differs by making evolving "nature" a key component of the design process. The realization of this process is called “Urbanature" and "Big Nature." As an evolving urban ecology, Charles Morris Anderson has described this connection as the “thinness.” It is the simultaneous perception and implicit understanding of the past, present, and future. Emo Urbanist projects include the built work of Charles Anderson at the Olympic Sculpture Park in Seattle, WA; The Anchorage Museum Common in Anchorage, AK; the yet to be constructed Project Phoenix in Haiti and Hellinikon's Metropolitan Park in Athens, Greece.

Ian Thompson has published a critical review of landscape urbanism in which he identifies its ten tenets and asks six critical questions. His conclusions are:

... there are ideas with the Landscape Urbanism discourse which have great merit, among which I would include the breaking down of professional distinctions, the integration of ecological thinking, the foregrounding of infrastructure, the interest in the positive use of waste materials and the emphasis upon functionality rather than mere appearance. There is also a quantity of dubious philosophy, unhelpful imagery and obscurantist language that Landscape Urbanism ought to dump. ... Larding the case for Landscape Urbanism with Deleuzian and Derridean references was a mistake, since it was done principally to impress an academic elite, and it has even left large sections of its intended audience bemused'.

== See also ==
- Landscape architecture
- Ecological Urbanism
- Urban design
- Urban planning
- Urban vitality
- Landscape planning
- Geodesign
- Post-postmodernism
- Landscape
- Landscape design
- Bat-Yam International Biennale of Landscape Urbanism
- Negative planning
