= The Theory of the Avant-Garde =

1960's nonfiction book by Rena Poggioli

The Theory of the Avant-Gard
- Book jacket image
- Author: Renato Poggiol
- Original title: 'Teoria dell'arte d'avanguardia'
- Translator: Gerald Fitzgerald
- Language: English
- Publisher: Il Mulino of Bologna, Italy, Belknap Press
- Publication date: 1962
- Publication place: Italy, United States
- English publication date: 1968
- Media type: Pint, eBook
- ISBN: 9780674882164
- OCLC: 465903649

The Theory of the Avant-Garde (Italian:Teoria dell'arte d'avanguardia) is a nonfiction book by Renato Poggioli, an Italian literary theorist. It was published in English translation in 1968 by The Belknap Press (Harvard University). In the book Poggioli discusses iterations of the avant-garde from various social and cultural perspectives beginning with 19th century Romanticism. The book was originally published in Italian in 1962 by Il Mulino of Bologna, Italy.

== Synopsis ==
The evolution of the avant-garde

According to Joseph Acheson, writing for the academic journal Leonardo, Poggioli describes the avant-garde as an integral part and as a constant of modern art. This movement began around 1880, when the term changed from a political label to an artistic marker. He views the movement as having begun in France, with poets such as Charles Baudelaire and Alfred Jarry. He shows that the movement's history goes back to French Romanticism and then how the avant-garde became its own unique concept. Poggioli describes the characteristics that separate avant-garde art from the classical. The most significant characteristic is the rejection of the past (nostalgia) to pursue a vision derived from an idealized future that is always out of reach. In other words, the most distinct change in his view is how the classical model of art is treated. While Romanticism rebelled against some rules, the avant-garde aims to move beyond binding tradition, focusing entirely on what is next rather than what has been.

According to Robert Langbaum, writing for the academic journal boundary2, Poggioli (the author) suggests that the avant-garde is defined by innovation, often referred to as "the myth of the new." This concept is derived from influential figures like Arthur Rimbaud, who pressed for being absolutely modern, and Ezra Pound, who famously urged creators to "make it new." Hence, the importance of innovation is well-known. However, Poggioli’s "myth of the new" engages with a debate that asks whether modernism is over, and whether postmodernism has taken its place. By focusing on each generation's drive for constant change, Poggioli reaches two overall conclusions:

1. The avant-garde functions like a law of nature within modern art.
2. And because the movement is based on being "new," each new generation of the avant-garde is destined to replace the one that came before it.

The question is whether artists are still creating truly original work, or if modernism has simply become a standard formula or a passing trend.
