= A+BE =

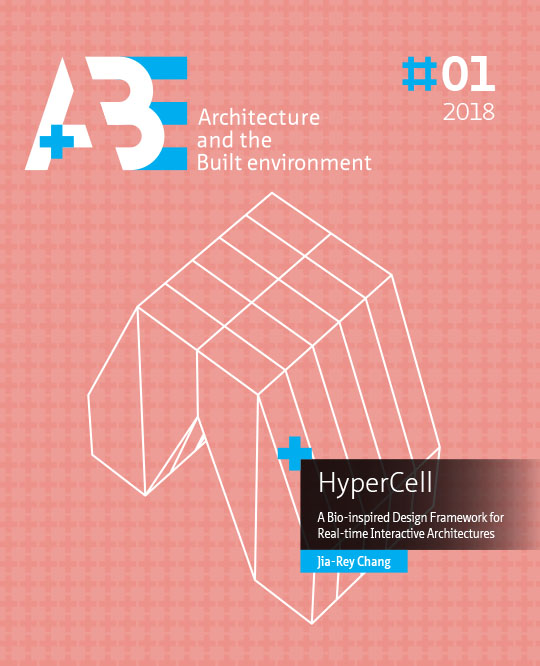
- Discipline: Architecture
- Language: Dutch, English
- Edited by: Frank van der Hoeven

Publication details
- History: 2011–present
- Publisher: TU Delft Open (Netherlands)
- Frequency: Monthly
- Open access: Yes
- License: CC BY 4.0

Standard abbreviations
- ISO 4: A+BE

Indexing
- ISSN: 2212-3202 (print); 2214-7233 (web)
- OCLC no.: 872331209

Links
- Journal homepage; Online access; Online archive

Architecture and the Built Environment (A+BE) is an open access series that publishes PhD theses of students of the Delft University of Technology's Graduate School of Architecture and the Built Environment, covering subjects such as: architecture, architectural engineering, green building, heritage, history, urbanism, real estate, housing, geomatics, geodesign, and management. The series was started in 2011 as part of the university's policy on open access and start of the Graduate School of Architecture and the Built Environment. The series is abstracted and indexed in Scopus.
