= Sylvia Poggioli =

American journalist (born 1946)

- Born: May 19, 1946 (age 80); Providence, Rhode Island, U.S.
- Education: Harvard College
- Occupation: NPR correspondent
- Spouse: Piero Benetazzo (died 2015)
- Father: Renato Poggioli

Sylvia Poggioli (/ˈsɪlviə pəˈdʒoʊli/ SIL-vee-ə pə-JOH-lee, Italian: [ˈsilvja podˈdʒɔːli]; born 19 May 1946) is a retired American radio reporter best known for her work with National Public Radio. She was the network's longtime senior European correspondent.

== Early life ==
Poggioli was born in Providence, Rhode Island, and raised in Cambridge, Massachusetts, where she attended the Buckingham School (now Buckingham Browne & Nichols). She graduated from Harvard College in 1968. She did post-graduate work at the University of Rome as a Fulbright Scholar. The selection of Rome was no coincidence, as she is the daughter of Italian anti-fascists who in the 1930s were forced to flee Italy under Mussolini. Her father, Renato Poggioli, was the author of The Theory of the Avant-Garde and one of the founders of the anti-fascist Mazzini Society.

== Career ==
In 1971, Poggioli began working for Ansa, the Italian news service, at their English desk. She made her debut on NPR on September 4, 1982. She continued serving both Ansa and NPR for four years before leaving Ansa in 1986.

Poggioli eventually rose to European correspondent for NPR. Her radio career was interrupted in 1990 when she spent a year as a research fellow at Harvard Kennedy School at Harvard University.

Poggioli was in London, gathering European reaction, during the 1991 Gulf War. Later, she was lauded for her coverage of the war among the Bosnians, Serbs, and Croats. For her coverage, she won the George Foster Peabody Award in 1993. In 1993, she also won the Weintal Prize for Diplomatic Reporting.

In 2005 Poggioli was the featured reporter for the funeral of Pope John Paul II and subsequent conclave.

Poggioli became a favorite reporter of the Magliozzi Brothers on Car Talk, possibly on account of their common Italian ancestry. They featured her name in a dish on a tongue-in-cheek NPR staff menu, as Sylvia Poggioli Ravioli. Her name has also been featured in the absurdist comic strip Zippy the Pinhead.

In 2000, Poggioli received an honorary Doctorate of Humane Letters from Brandeis University. In 2006, she received an honorary degree from the University of Massachusetts at Boston.

In March 2023, NPR announced her retirement, effective at the end of the month. In retirement, she plans to write a biography about her father.

== Personal life ==
Poggioli resides in Rome, Italy. Her husband, Piero Benetazzo, a 1982 Nieman Fellow, died January 11, 2015, at home in Rome 13 months after he was diagnosed with a brain tumor. He was 78.

== See also ==
- List of Peabody Award winners (1990–1999)
- Tom and Ray Magliozzi
