= Renato Poggioli =

Italian literary critic

Renato Poggioli (April 16, 1907 in Florence – May 3, 1963 in Crescent City), was an Italian academic specializing in comparative literature. After 1938, he lived in the United States. At the time of his death, he was the Curt Hugo Reisinger Professor of Slavic and Comparative Literature at Harvard University. A prolific writer and translator, who was fluent in five languages, he is considered one of the founders of the academic discipline of comparative literature in the United States.

== Early life ==
Poggioli was born in Florence, Italy, the son of a railroad administrator. In 1929 he received his doctorate in letters with a specialty in Slavic literature under the direction of Ettore Lo Gatto of the University of Florence. He also worked as a translator and critic. In 1931–32 he was an exchange professor at the University of Prague, returning to Prague in 1934 to lecture on Italian culture as a representative of the Italian government. He also lectured in this capacity in Vilnius and Warsaw in Poland. In 1935, he married Renata Nordio, a former classmate and student of Spanish literature at the University of Florence. He received a second doctorate in 1937 at the University of Rome.

== Academic career and writings ==
In 1938 Poggioli, who wished to leave Italy, came to the United States with his wife to teach in a summer program at Middlebury College in Vermont. Virtually on his arrival in New England, he became involved in anti-Fascist initiatives that led in 1939 to the creation of the Mazzini Society, of which he also served as interim president. Members included Gaetano Salvemini (whose final lectures before his exile from Italy in 1925 Poggioli had heard as a student at the University of Florence); the former Italian foreign minister, Count Carlo Sforza; and Max Ascoli.

In the fall of 1938 Poggioli was hired as a visiting lecturer in Romance language and literatures at Smith College, Northampton, Massachusetts, where he gave a course in Dante. The following year he became Assistant Professor of Italian Literature teaching graduate students at Brown University in Providence, Rhode Island, with an interruption from 1943–45 when he served in the United States Army as a translator. The academic year 1946–47 saw his first stint, at the behest of Harry Levin, as visiting professor at Harvard. He also taught during the summer of 1947 at the University of Chicago.

Poggioli's most ambitious project during this period was his founding editorship, with Italian writer Luigi Berti who was based in Florence, of the Italian-language literary periodical Inventario (1946–1963) to which Poggioli contributed numerous articles and translations. The publication was intended to expose Italian readers, whose horizons had for years been narrowed by Mussolini's censorship, to a broad range of new developments in contemporary literature of all countries. It published literary and critical works by and about such important writers as Giuseppe Ungaretti, Pablo Neruda, T. S. Eliot, Salvatore Quasimodo, Vladimir Nabokov, and Boris Pasternak. Poggioli's own magnum opus, his Teoria dell'arte d'avanguardia, which traced the connection between the twentieth-century avant garde and the legacy of nineteenth-century Romanticism, first appeared in Inventario in four installments between 1949 and 51.

In the fall of 1947, Harvard University, as part of its ongoing expansion of its department of Slavic studies, hired Poggioli and two year later, Roman Jakobson – in 1952 the two would collaborate on an edition of the Medieval Russian epic, Tale of Igor's Campaign. Poggioli was named full professor of Slavic and Comparative Literature at Harvard in 1950. In 1951 he became head of the Department of Slavic Studies, switching over in 1952 to head the Department of Comparative Literature, a position he held until his death. While teaching at Harvard, Poggioli also received Fulbright grants to teach at La Sapienza in Rome (1953–54), at the Sorbonne in Paris (1961) and at the University of Puerto Rico (1962).

Poggioli's best known book is his Teoria dell'arte d'avanguardia (1962), which was not issued as a single volume until 1962. It was translated posthumously into English as The Theory of the Avant-Garde (Gerald Fitzgerald, translator, Harvard University Press, 1968). Poggioli was also the author of The Poets of Russia 1890–1930 (Harvard University Press, 1960), a study of the poets of the so-called "Silver Age" of Russian poetry (1890–1910), which was awarded the 1960 Harvard Faculty Prize; and The Oaten Flute: Essays on Pastoral Poetry and the Pastoral Ideal (Harvard University Press, 1975).

== Death and legacy ==
After completing an academic year at Stanford University as a Fellow at the Center for Advanced Study in the Behavioral Sciences, Poggioli took his family by car to Portland, Oregon, where he intended to visit Reed College. En route, Poggioli's car crashed, and he died of his injuries several days later in a hospital in Crescent City, California. Mrs. Poggioli was also severely injured in the accident that killed her husband; their daughter, Sylvia, who was in the car with her parents, suffered minor injuries.

Poggioli is briefly mentioned in Saul Bellow's 1964 novel Herzog. His daughter, Sylvia Poggioli, who was born when her father was teaching at Brown University, is the senior European correspondent for NPR.
