= Charles Waldheim =

American architect and author

Charles Waldheim is an American architect and author who is the John E. Irving Professor of Landscape Architecture at the Harvard Graduate School of Design and the director of the School's Office for Urbanization. He created the term and philosophical framework for "Landscape Urbanism," which describes the use of landscape to shape urban space and infrastructure. He received the Prince Charitable Trusts Rome Prize in 2007. He is the author of the books The Landscape Urbanism Reader (Princeton Architecture Press, 2006), CASE--Hilberseimer/Mies van der Rohe, Lafayette Park Detroit (Prestel, 2004), Chicago Architecture: Histories, Revisions, Alternatives (University of Chicago Press, 2005), and Landscape as Urbanism: A General Theory (Princeton University Press, 2015).
