= Geodesign =

Set of geospatial design concepts and methods

Geodesign is a set of concepts and methods used to involve all stakeholders and various professions in collaboratively designing and realizing the optimal solution for spatial challenges in the built and natural environments, utilizing all available techniques and data in an integrated process. GeoDesign is a methodology that provides the context and content for making spatial decisions. It provides the practical means for implementing change. Originally, geodesign was mainly applied during the design and planning phase. "Geodesign is a design and planning method which tightly couples the creation of design proposals with impact simulations informed by geographic contexts." Now, it is also used during realization and maintenance phases and to facilitate re-use of for example buildings or industrial areas. Geodesign includes project conceptualization, analysis, design specification, stakeholder participation and collaboration, design creation, simulation, and evaluation (among other stages).

== History ==
Geodesign builds greatly on a long history of work in geographic information science, computer-aided design, landscape architecture, and other environmental design fields. See for instance, the work of Ian McHarg and Carl Steinitz.

Members of the various disciplines and practices relevant to geodesign have held defining discussions at a workshop on Spatial Concepts in GIS and Design in December 2008 and the GeoDesign Summit in January 2010. GeoDesign Summit 2010 Conference Videos from Day 1 and Day 2 are an important resource to learn about the many different aspects of GeoDesign. ESRI co-founder Jack Dangermond has introduced each of the GeoDesign Summit meetings. Designer and technologist Bran Ferren, was the keynote speaker for the first and fourth Summit meetings in Redlands, California. During the fourth conference he presented a provocative view of how what is needed is a 250-year plan, and how GeoDesign was a key concept in making this a reality. Carl Steinitz was a presenter at both the 2010 and 2015 Summits.

Environmental GeoDesign was introduced in 2012 for the Rio+20 Conference. The 2013 Geodesign Summit drew a record 260 attendees from the United States and abroad. That same year, a master's degree in Geodesign — the first of its kind in the nation — began at Philadelphia University. Claudia Goetz Phillips, director of Landscape Architecture and GeoDesign at Philadelphia University says "it is very exciting to be at the forefront of this exciting and relevant paradigm shift in how we address twenty-first-century global to local design and planning issues."

== Theory ==
The theory underpinning Geodesign derives from the work of Patrick Geddes in the first half of the twentieth century and Ian McHarg in its second half. They advocated a layered approach to regional planning, landscape planning and urban planning. McHarg drew the layers on translucent overlays. Through the work of Jack Dangermond, Carl Steinitz, Henk Scholten and others the layers were modeled with Geographical Information Systems (GIS). The three components of this term each say something about its character. 'Geographical' implies that the layers are geographical (geology, soils, hydrology, roads, land use etc.). 'Information' implies a positivist and scientific methodology. 'System' implies the use of computer technology for the information processing. The scientific aspects of Geodesign contrast with the cultural emphasis of Landscape Urbanism but the two approaches to landscape planning share a concern for layered analysis which sits comfortably with postmodern and post-postmodern theory.

== Technologies ==
Nascent geodesign technology extends geographic information systems so that in addition to analyzing existing environments and geodata, users can synthesize new environments and modify geodata. See, for example, CommunityViz or marinemap.

"GeoDesign brings geographic analysis into the design process, where initial design sketches are instantly vetted for suitability against myriad database layers describing a variety of physical and social factors for the spatial extent of the project. This on-the-fly suitability analysis provides a framework for design, giving land-use planners, engineers, transportation planners, and others involved with design, the tools to leverage geographic information within their design workflows."

== See also ==
- Geography
- Technical Geography
- Environmental design
- Landscape Architecture
- Landscape urbanism
- Landscape planning
- Geographic Information System
- Participatory GIS
- Public Participation GIS
- Spatial Decision Support System

== Bibliography ==
- Ian L. McHarg. 1969. Design With Nature. Garden City, NY: Doubleday/Natural History Press. ISBN 0-471-11460-X
- Ian L. McHarg and Frederick Steiner, editors. 1998.To Heal the Earth: Selected Writings of Ian L. McHarg. Washington, D.C.: Island Press. ISBN 1-55963-573-8
- Ian L. McHarg. 1996. A Quest for Life: An Autobiography. New York: John Wiley & Sons. ISBN 0-471-08628-2
- Frederick Steiner, editor. 2006. The Essential Ian McHarg: Writings on Design and Nature. Washington, D.C.: Island Press. ISBN 1-59726-117-3
- Frederick Steiner. 2008. The Living Landscape (paperback edition). Washington, D.C. Island Press. ISBN 978-1-59726-396-2
- Carl Steinitz, Hector Arias, Scott Bassett, Michael Flaxman, Thomas Goode, Thomas Maddock, David Mouat, Richard Peiser, and Allan Shearer. 2003. Alternative Futures for Changing Landscapes: The Upper San Pedro River Basin In Arizona And Sonora. Washington, D.C.: Island Press.
- Carl Steinitz. 2012. A framework for Geodesign - changing geography by design. Redlands: Esri Press. ISBN 9781589483330
- Danbi J.Lee, Eduardo Dias, Henk J. Scholten. 2014. Geodesign by integrating design and geospatial sciences. Springer International Publishing Switzerland. ISBN 978-3-319-08298-1 DOI 10.1007/978-3-319-08299-8
- Frank van der Hoeven, Steffen Nijhuis, Sisi Zlatanova, Eduardo Dias, Stefan van der Spek. 2016. Geo-Design: Advances in bridging geo-information technology, urban planning and landscape architecture. Research in Urbanism Series (RiUS), Volume 4, ISSN 1875-0192 (print), E-ISSN 1879-8217 (online) Delft: TU Delft Open, 2016 ISBN 978-94-92516-42-8.
- Paul Cureton and Elliot Hartley, Geodesign, Urban Digital Twins, and Futures, Routledge. ISBN 978-1-032-74861-0.
