= CommunityViz =

Extensions to ArcGIS Geographic Information System software

- Developer: Texas A&M AgriLife Extension
- Stable release: 5.2 / February 17, 2017
- Operating system: Windows
- Type: ArcGIS extension
- License: Proprietary
- Website: communityviz.com

CommunityViz is a collection of extensions to ArcGIS Geographic Information System (GIS) software. It is an analysis and visualization tool used in fields such as urban planning, land-use planning, geodesign, transportation planning and natural resource management. CommunityViz provides 3D visualization through its Scenario 3D and Scenario 360 plugins and allows users to export and view their work in ArcGIS Online, Google Earth, and other KML/KMZ viewers.

The software was originally created by the Orton Family Foundation, which transferred production to Placeways LLC in 2005. In 2017, development was acquired by City Explained, Inc., and in 2023, ownership transferred to Texas A&M AgriLife Extension Service, where development continues with the CHARM (Community Hazards and Resource Management) team.

== History ==
CommunityViz originated in the late 1990s, when Noel Fritzinger and his colleague Lyman Orton, proprietor of the Vermont Country Store and a long-serving member of his town’s planning board, envisioned a software tool to make the planning process more accessible to citizens. After forming the Orton Family Foundation, they assembled a consultant team that included the Environmental Simulation Center, Fore Site Consulting, PricewaterhouseCoopers, MultiGen-Paradigm, and Green Mountain GeoGraphics.

The first commercial release appeared in 2001. It featured three components: Scenario Constructor, for interactive analysis; SiteBuilder 3D (licensed from MultiGen-Paradigm), for 3D visualization; and Simulator, for agent-based modeling of policy outcomes.

By 2003, research and user experience guided a redevelopment that produced CommunityViz Version 2, designed for the ArcGIS 8.x. architecture. Scenario Constructor became Scenario 360, with a redesigned interface; SiteBuilder 3D was updated, while Policy Simulator was removed. The streamlined design gained wide adoption.

In 2005, CommunityViz development and operations were spun off into Placeways LLC, with ongoing support from the Orton Family Foundation. Placeways oversaw significant releases, including:

- Version 3 (2005): introduced “decision tool” architecture.
- Version 4 (2009): incorporated new 3D technologies.
- Version 5 (2015): added web publishing capabilities.

At the 2011 Esri Business Partners Conference, Placeways received the “Extension to ArcGIS Desktop” award for CommunityViz. In 2017, City Explained, Inc. assumed responsibility for the software.

In 2023, Texas A&M AgriLife Extension purchased CommunityViz and its companion CViz Pro Software, expanding on its two decades of use in scenario planning, coastal resilience preparedness, and sustainable community development.

The current release, Version 5.2, is compatible with ArcGIS 10.5, 10.6, 10.7, and 10.8. It is sold under separate licenses for commercial, government/non-profit, and educational users. Development of CViz Pro Software continues and is currently in the testing phase.

== Tools ==
CommunityViz provides a wide range of analytical and visualization tools, including:

- 360 Indicators Wizard: generates up to 101 indicators.
- Custom Impacts Wizard: assists in designing new indicators.
- Land Use Designer: paints desired land uses and analyzes their effects.
- Build-Out Wizard: calculates development capacity.
- Suitability Wizard: evaluates land suitability for uses.
- TimeScope: visualizes changes over time.
- Allocator 4 and 5: land-use allocation models (LUAM) that distribute new development across the map according to suitability and capacity.

CommunityViz also features robust 3D capabilities. Scenario 3D supports interactive 3D modeling using SketchUp and CAD models (.KMZ, .3DS, .DAE) within ArcGIS ArcScene, with export options to Google Earth.

Scenario 360 enables users to build and compare scenarios using custom formulas, indicators, and dynamic charts that update in real time. It incorporates ArcGIS data directly, while supporting integration with external models.

The software’s dynamic analysis engine includes more than 90 functions, ranging from arithmetic to complex geospatial calculations, which can be combined into compound formulas for advanced modeling. Results are displayed in maps, tables, charts, reports, and 3D visualizations.

== Use ==
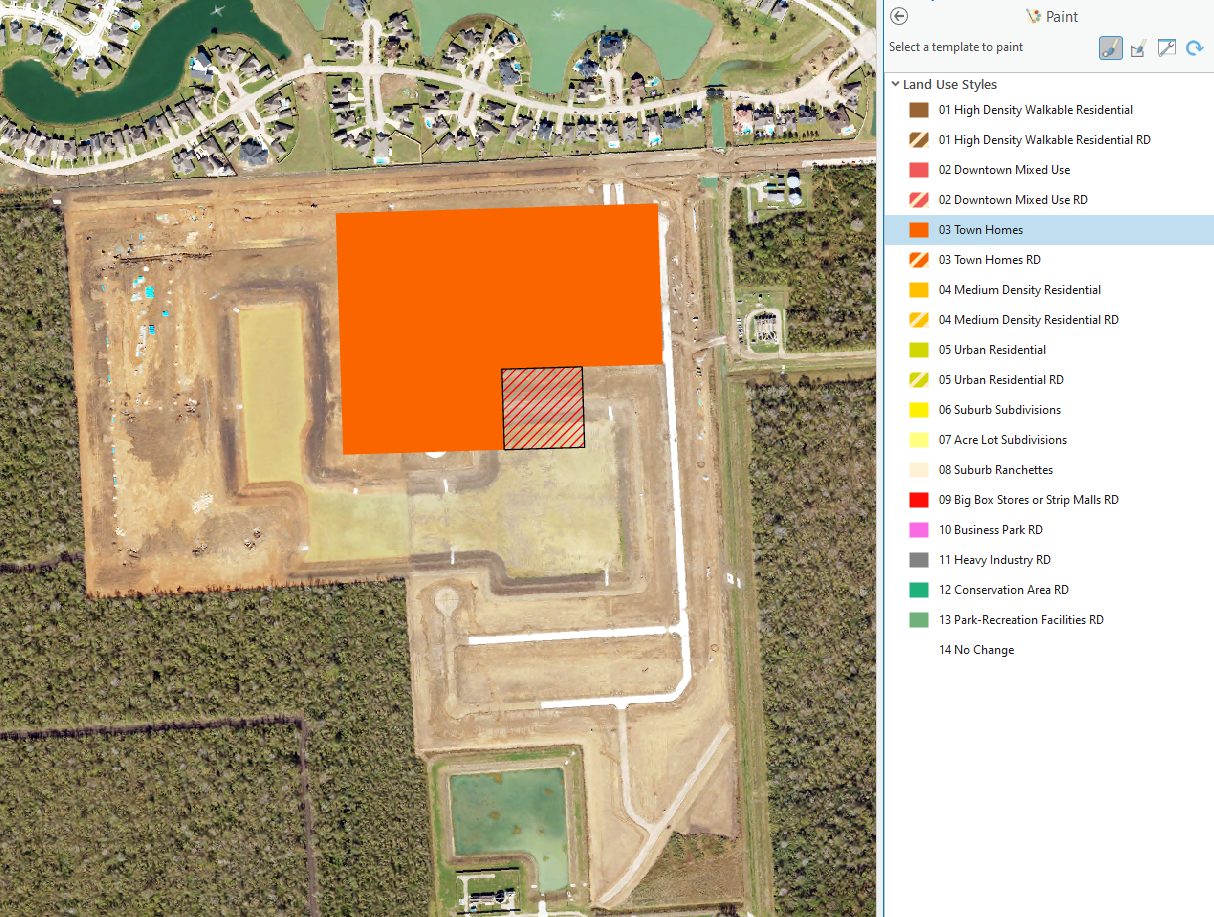
CommunityViz's Paint feature.

CommunityViz is widely used for land-use and natural resource planning but is adaptable to a broad range of geographic decision-making processes. Its main users include:

- Government agencies (local, regional, and national).
- Private planning and design firms.
- Academic and research institutions.

It has been cited in multiple academic and applied research studies.
