= Avant-garde =

Works that are experimental or innovative

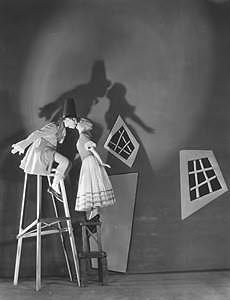
Avant-garde cinema, The Love of Zero (1927), a short film directed by the artist Robert Florey

In the arts and literature, the term avant-garde (from French meaning 'advance guard' or 'vanguard') identifies an experimental genre or work of art, and the artist who created it, which usually is aesthetically innovative, whilst initially being ideologically unacceptable to the artistic establishment of the time. The military metaphor of an advance guard identifies the artists and writers whose innovations in style, form, and subject-matter challenge the artistic and aesthetic validity of the established forms of art and the literary traditions of their time; thus, the artists who created the anti-novel and surrealism were regarded by some contemporaries as ahead of their times.

As a stratum of the intelligentsia of a society, some avant-garde artists promote progressive and radical politics and advocate for societal reform with and through works of art. In the essay "The Artist, the Scientist, and the Industrialist" (1824), Henri de Saint-Simon's political usage of vanguard identified the moral obligation of artists to "serve as [the] avant-garde" of the people, because "the power of the arts is, indeed, the most immediate and fastest way" to realise social, political, and economic reforms.

In the realm of culture, the artistic experiments of the avant-garde push the aesthetic boundaries of societal norms, such as the disruptions of modernism in poetry, fiction, drama, painting, music, and architecture that occurred in the late 19th and early 20th centuries. In art history, the socio-cultural functions of avant-garde art trace from Dada (1915–1920s) through the Situationist International (1957–1972) to the postmodernism of the American language poets (1960s–1970s).

== History ==
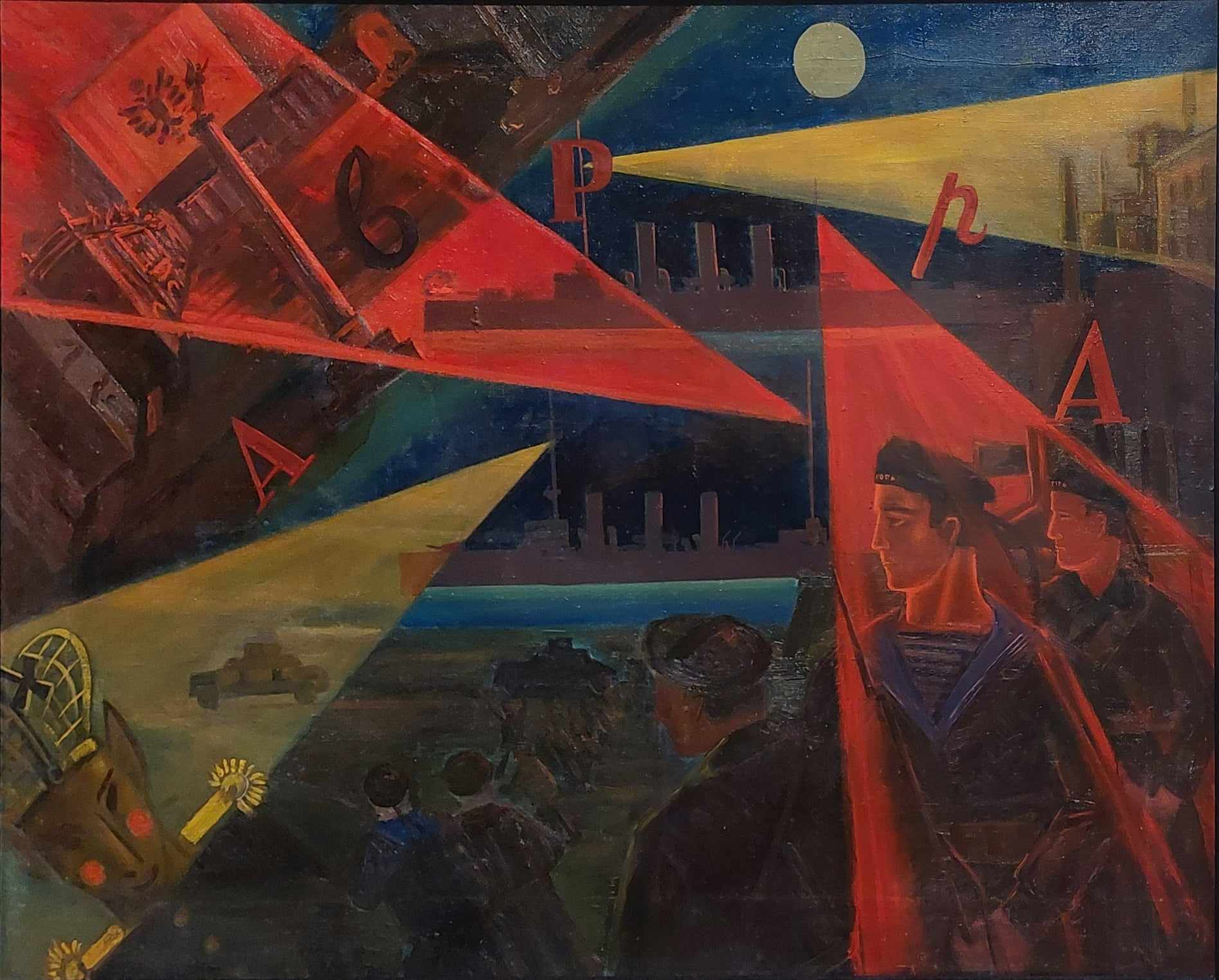
Political revolution has influenced both the topic and form in The Overthrow of the Autocracy, a Soviet avant-garde painting circa the Russian Revolution.

The French military term avant-garde (advanced guard) identified a reconnaissance unit who scouted the terrain ahead of the main force of the army. In 19th-century French politics, the term avant-garde (vanguard) identified left-wing political reformists who agitated for radical political change in French society. By the mid-19th century, avant-garde referred to art that used aesthetic innovation as a means of political and social change. Since the 20th century, the art term avant-garde identifies a stratum of the intelligentsia that comprises novelists, writers, artists, architects, et al. whose creative perspectives, ideas, and experimental artworks challenge the cultural values of contemporary bourgeois society.

In the U.S. of the 1960s, the post–WWII changes to American culture and society allowed avant-garde artists to produce works of art that addressed the matters of the day, usually in political and sociologic opposition to the cultural conformity inherent to popular culture and consumerism as a way of life and as a worldview.

== Theories ==
In The Theory of the Avant-Garde (Italian: Teoria dell'arte d'avanguardia; 1962), the academic Renato Poggioli provides an early analysis of the avant-garde in art and as an artistic movement. Surveying the historical, social, psychological, and philosophical aspects of artistic vanguardism, Poggioli's examples of avant-garde art, poetry, and music show that avant-garde artists share some values and ideals as contemporary bohemians.

In Theory of the Avant-Garde (German: Theorie der Avantgarde; 1974), the literary critic Peter Bürger looks at the establishment's embrace of socially critical works of art as capitalist co-optation of the artists and the genre of avant-garde art, because "art as an institution neutralizes the political content of the individual work [of art]".

In Neo-avantgarde and Culture Industry: Essays on European and American Art from 1955 to 1975 (2000), Benjamin H. D. Buchloh argues for a dialectical approach to such political stances by avant-garde artists and the avant-garde genre of art.

== Society and the avant-garde ==
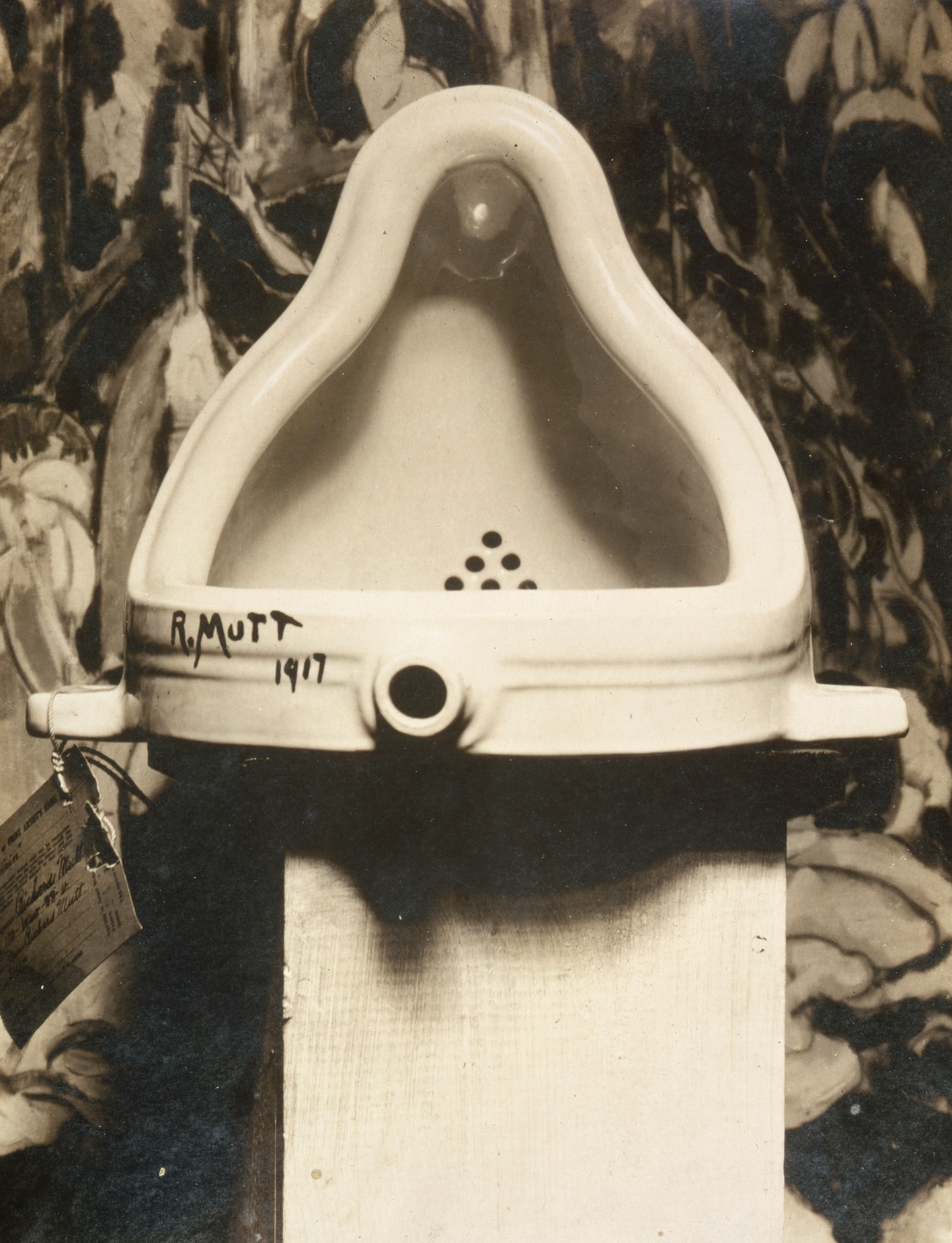
The cultural provocation of avant-garde art: Fountain (1917) by Marcel Duchamp. (Alfred Stieglitz)

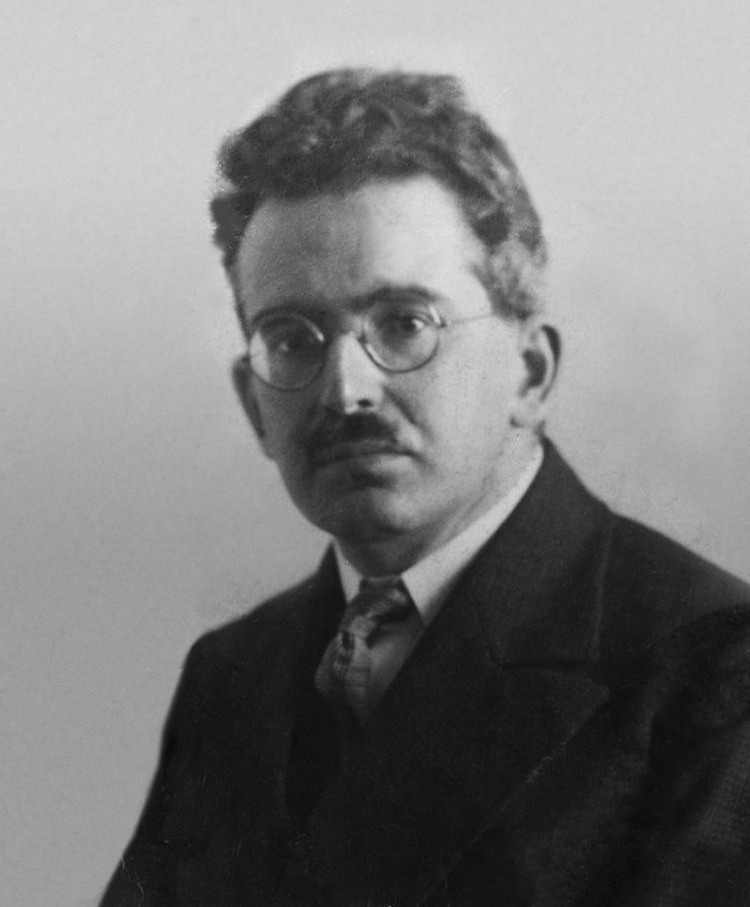
In "The Work of Art in the Age of Mechanical Reproduction" (1935), Walter Benjamin addresses the artistic and cultural, social, economic, and political functions of art in a capitalist society.

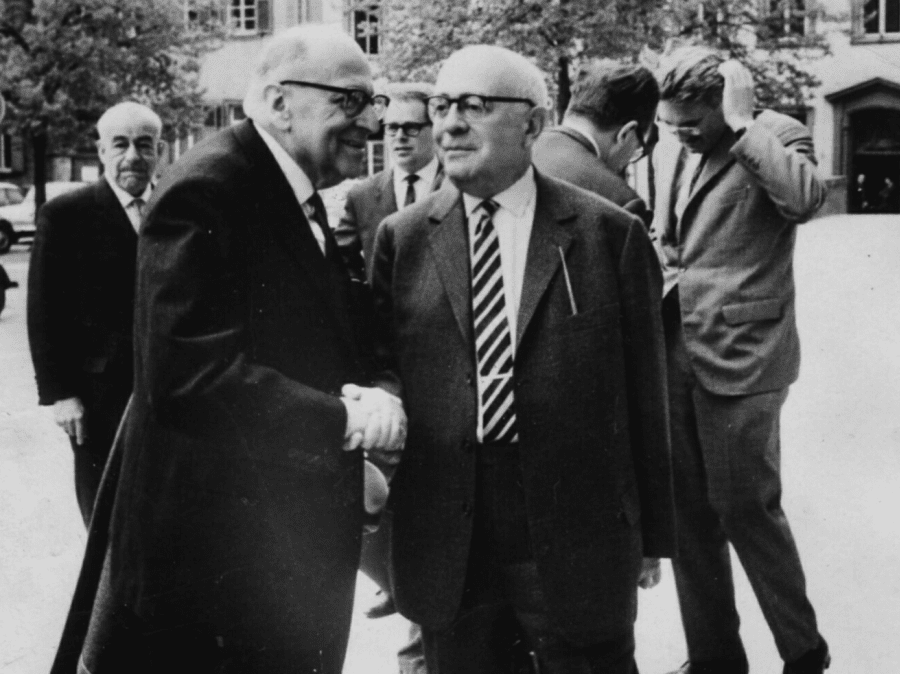
Intellectuals of the avant-garde: Max Horkheimer (left) and Theodor Adorno (right) at Heidelberg in 1965

Sociologically, as a stratum of the intelligentsia of a society, avant-garde artists, writers, architects, et al. produce artefacts – works of art, books, buildings – that intellectually and ideologically oppose the conformist value system of mainstream society. In the essay "Avant-Garde and Kitsch" (1939), Clement Greenberg said that the artistic vanguard opposes high culture and rejects the artifice of mass culture, because the avant-garde functionally opposes the dumbing down of society – be it with low culture or with high culture. That in a capitalist society each medium of mass communication is a factory producing artworks, and is not a legitimate artistic medium; therefore, the products of mass culture are kitsch, simulations and simulacra of art.

Walter Benjamin in the essay "The Work of Art in the Age of Mechanical Reproduction" (1939) and Theodor Adorno and Max Horkheimer in Dialectic of Enlightenment (1947) said that the artifice of mass culture voids the artistic value (the aura) of a work of art. That the capitalist culture industry (publishing, music, radio, cinema, etc.) continually produces artificial culture for mass consumption, which is facilitated by mechanically produced art-products of mediocre quality displacing art of quality workmanship; thus, the profitability of art-as-commodity determines its artistic value.

In The Society of the Spectacle (1967), Guy Debord said that the financial, commercial, and economic co-optation of the avant-garde into a commodity produced by capitalism makes doubtful that avant-garde artists will remain culturally and intellectually relevant to their societies for preferring profit to cultural change and political progress. In The Theory-Death of the Avant-Garde (1991), Paul Mann said that the avant-garde is economically integral to the contemporary institutions of the establishment, specifically as part of the culture industry. Noting the conceptual shift, theoreticians, such as Matei Calinescu in Five Faces of Modernity: Modernism, Avant-garde, Decadence, Kitsch, Postmodernism (1987), and Hans Bertens in The Idea of the Postmodern: A History (1995), have said that Western culture entered a post-modern time when the modernist ways of thought-and-action and the production of art became redundant in a capitalist economy.

Scholars have highlighted the troubling associations of avant-garde movements with authoritarian politics and right wing movements in Europe like Nazism and Fascism. Avant-garde figureheads like the American poet Ezra Pound, Wyndham Lewis, and the Italian futurist F.T Marinetti and their alliances with twentieth century authoritarian politics have sparked controversy.

Parting from the claims of Greenberg in the late 1930s and the insights of Poggioli in the early 1960s, in The De-Definition of Art: Action Art to Pop to Earthworks (1983), the critic Harold Rosenberg said that since the middle of the 1960s the politically progressive avant-garde ceased being adversaries to artistic commercialism and the mediocrity of mass culture, which political disconnection transformed being an artist into "a profession, one of whose aspects is the pretense of overthrowing [the profession of being an artist]."

Avant-garde is frequently defined in contrast to arrière-garde, which in its original military sense refers to a rearguard force that protects the advance-guard. The term was less frequently used than avant-garde in 20th-century art criticism. The art historians Natalie Adamson and Toby Norris argue that arrière-garde is not reducible to a kitsch style or reactionary orientation, but can instead be used to refer to artists who engage with the legacy of the avant-garde while maintaining an awareness that doing so is in some sense anachronistic. The critic Charles Altieri argues that avant-garde and arrière-garde are interdependent: "where there is an avant-garde, there must be an arrière-garde."

== Examples ==
=== Music ===
Avant-garde music can refer to any form of music working within traditional structures while seeking to breach boundaries in some manner. The term is used loosely to describe the work of any musicians who radically depart from tradition altogether. By this definition, some avant-garde composers of the 20th century include Arnold Schoenberg, Richard Strauss (in his earliest work), Charles Ives, Igor Stravinsky, Anton Webern, Edgard Varèse, Alban Berg, George Antheil (in his earliest works only), Henry Cowell (in his earliest works), Harry Partch, John Cage, Iannis Xenakis, Morton Feldman, Karlheinz Stockhausen, Pauline Oliveros, Philip Glass, Meredith Monk, Laurie Anderson, and Diamanda Galás.

There is another definition of "avant-gardism" that distinguishes it from "modernism": Peter Bürger, for example, says avant-gardism rejects the "institution of art" and challenges social and artistic values, and so necessarily involves political, social, and cultural factors. According to the composer and musicologist Larry Sitsky, modernist composers from the early 20th century who do not qualify as avant-gardists include Arnold Schoenberg, Anton Webern, and Igor Stravinsky; later modernist composers who do not fall into the category of avant-gardists include Elliott Carter, Milton Babbitt, György Ligeti, Witold Lutosławski, and Luciano Berio, since "their modernism was not conceived for the purpose of goading an audience."

The 1960s saw a wave of free and avant-garde music in the jazz genre, embodied by artists such as Ornette Coleman, Sun Ra, Albert Ayler, Archie Shepp, John Coltrane, and Miles Davis. In rock music of the 1970s, the "art" descriptor was generally understood to mean "aggressively avant-garde" or "pretentiously progressive". Post-punk artists from the late 1970s rejected traditional rock sensibilities in favor of an avant-garde aesthetic.

=== Theatre ===
The avant-garde has a significant history in 20th-century music, although it is more pronounced in theatre and performance art, often in conjunction with music and sound design innovations, as well as developments in visual media design. There are movements in theatre history that are characterized by their contributions to the avant-garde traditions in both the United States and Europe. Among these are Fluxus, Happenings, and Neo-Dada.

=== Architecture ===
Brutalist architecture was greatly influenced by an avant-garde movement.

=== Photography ===
Avant-garde photography has often been associated with efforts to rethink what photographs could do beyond straightforward representation, including experiments with the medium’s material procedures, its modes of perception, and its channels of circulation. In early 20th-century modernism, photographers and teachers connected with the Bauhaus promoted open-ended experimentation with process, including cameraless techniques such as the photogram, which treated photographic paper and light as tools for making new abstract forms rather than merely reproducing the visible world. Related strands of avant-garde practice emphasized radical framing—unusual vantage points, sharp cropping, and close observation—as a way to estrange familiar subjects and to develop a “new vision” of everyday life. Such approaches were often intertwined with darkroom intervention (including montage and other constructed procedures) and with modern print culture, as photographic ideas and images circulated through illustrated magazines, photobooks, and international exhibitions.

Figures such as László Moholy-Nagy became emblematic of Bauhaus-linked experimentation, while artists including Man Ray produced cameraless "rayographs" and related darkroom experiments. In the Soviet context, Constructivist photographers such as Aleksandr Rodchenko helped popularize dramatic high and low angles intended to make viewers see familiar things in new ways. Museum scholarship on Japan likewise describes an interwar movement of "avant-garde photography"—including what it terms Shinkō shashin ("New Photography")—influenced by contact with Surrealism and abstraction, which developed through amateur groups and magazine culture; one such circle was the Nagoya Photo Avant-Garde, in which the poet-photographer Kansuke Yamamoto participated. Within this prewar avant-garde visual culture, a notable conduit for Surrealist imagery in Japan was the 1937 touring exhibition Kaigai Chōgenjitsushugi Sakuhinten, which (as later scholarship notes) relied heavily on prints and photographic reproductions to circulate Surrealist images and ideas.

== Avant-garde types ==
- Abstract expressionism – American post–World War II art movement
- Art film – Film genre
- Artivism – Art activism
- Beat Generation – Literary movement
- COBRA – Artist collective and art movement
- Conceptual art – Art movement
- Constructivism – Artistic and architectural philosophy originating in Russia
- Creationism – Literary movement that started around 1912
- Cubism – 20th-century avant-garde art movement
- Dadaism – Avant-garde art movement in the early 20th century
- De Stijl – Dutch art movement founded 1917
- Expressionism – Modernist art movement
- Fauvism – Early 20th-century artistic style
- Fluxus – International network of artists, composers and designers
- Futurism – Artistic and social movement
- Happening – Type of performance artwork
- Heta-uma – Japanese manga movement
- Imaginism – Russian poetry movement
- Imagism – 20th-century poetry movement
- Impressionism – 19th-century art movement
- Incoherents – 19th-century French art movement
- Land art – Art movement of the 1960s and 1970s
- Les Nabis – French artists
- Lyrical Abstraction – Art movement
- Massurrealism – Art movement started in the 1990s
- Minimal art – Visual arts movement
- Neo-Dada – Art movement from the late 1950s with similarities to the original Dada movement
- Orphism – Art movement, an offshoot of cubism
- Pop art – Art movement emerging in the mid-1950s
- Precisionism – Art movement
- Primitivism – Art movement
- Rayonism – Russian art movement
- Situationism – International organization of social revolutionaries (1957–72)
- Suprematism – Early-20th-century Russian art movement
- Surrealism – International cultural movement (1920s–1950s)
- Symbolism – Representation that conveys deeper meaning
- Tachisme – French style of abstract painting
- Universal Constructivism – Art movement from 1930–1970
- Viennese Actionism – Austrian short-lived art movement
- Vorticism – British modernist art movement formed in 1914
- Nadaism – Colombian counterculture movement
- Stridentism – Mexican avant-garde movement
- Ultraist – Literary movement
- Zenitism – Yugoslavian avant-garde art movement from 1921 to 1926

== See also ==
- Absurdism – Theory that life is meaningless
- Anti-art – Art rejecting prior definitions of art
- Bauhaus – German art school and art movement
- Chinese Apartment Art – 1970s–1990s art movement in China
- Experimental film – Cinematic works that are experimental form or content
- Experimental literature – Genre of literature
- Experimental music – Music genre
- Experimental theatre – Genre of theater
- List of avant-garde artists
- Outsider art – Art created outside the boundaries of official culture by those untrained in the arts
- Relationship between avant-garde art and American pop culture – Ways avant-garde art and American pop culture have intertwined
- The Theory of the Avante-Garde – 1960's nonfiction book by Rena Poggioli by Renato Poggioli
- Russian avant-garde – Russian and Soviet art movement (approx. 1890–1930)
