= Marinemap =

Group of scientists and geospatial technologists

MarineMap Consortium
- Formation: 2007
- Type: Research consortium
- Purpose: Development of geospatial tools for marine protected area planning
- Headquarters: University of California, Santa Barbara, Santa Barbara, California, United States
- Region served: Worldwide
- Products: MarineMap decision support tool
- Affiliations: University of California, Santa Barbara; The Nature Conservancy; Ecotrust

The MarineMap Consortium is a group of scientists and geospatial technologists at the University of California Santa Barbara (UCSB), The Nature Conservancy (TNC) and Ecotrust.

== History ==
In 2007, the MarineMap Consortium formed to develop geospatial technologies at facilitating marine protected area (MPA) planning in California. The California Marine Life Protection Act Initiative (MLPAI) contracted the MarineMap consortium to develop a web-based decision support system geared toward helping non-technical users (i.e., stakeholders) design MPAs. Consequently, the consortium developed their flagship application, called MarineMap.

The MarineMap Consortium is now working to extend the MarineMap decision support tool to be used by collaborative, participatory and science-based marine planning efforts around the world.

== MarineMap Decision Support Tool ==
The MarineMap decision support tool is a web-based program for designing marine protected areas (MPAs). In particular, users can (1) view and query a large number of geospatial data layers, (2) draw prospective MPA boundaries, (3) analyze the contents of prospective MPAs, (4) estimate economic impacts of prospective MPAs, (5) assemble MPAs into collections (called "arrays"), (6) share MPAs and arrays with other MarineMap users, (7) assign allowed uses within prospective MPAs, and (9) export MPA shapes to KML and reports to CSV files.

In 2010, the U.S. Institute for Environmental Conflict Resolution awarded the Innovation in Technology and Environmental Conflict Resolution to the MarineMap Consortium.
