= Kongjian Yu =

Chinese landscape architect and urban planner (1963–2025)

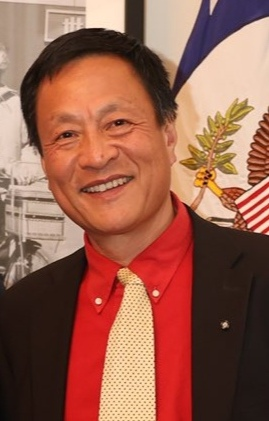
Yu in 2024

Kongjian Yu (simplified Chinese: 俞孔坚; traditional Chinese: 俞孔堅; pinyin: Yú Kǒngjiān; 12 May 1963 – 23 September 2025) was a Chinese landscape architect and urban planner. He was a professor at Peking University and the founder of Turenscape, a design firm specializing in landscape architecture, urban planning, and ecological restoration. Yu was recognized for developing the sponge cities concept, which promotes nature-based solutions for urban water management. His research has influenced national policies in China and has been applied in urban planning worldwide. Yu has been heralded by Michael Sorkin as "a hero of effective advocacy within a system fraught with perils" and recognized as a leader in ecological urbanism and the constructive postmodernist approach towards ecological civilization.

== Early life and education ==
Yu was born in 1963 in Dongyu Village, Jinhua, Zhejiang Province, China, into a farming family. Yu earned his Bachelor and Master of Landscape Architecture degrees from Beijing Forestry University. In 1992, he pursued a Doctor of Design (DDes) at the Harvard Graduate School of Design (GSD), completing his dissertation on ecological security patterns in 1995.

At Harvard, he was influenced by scholars Carl Steinitz, Richard Forman, and Ian McHarg. His dissertation was "Security Patterns in Landscape Planning: With a Case in South China".

== Career ==
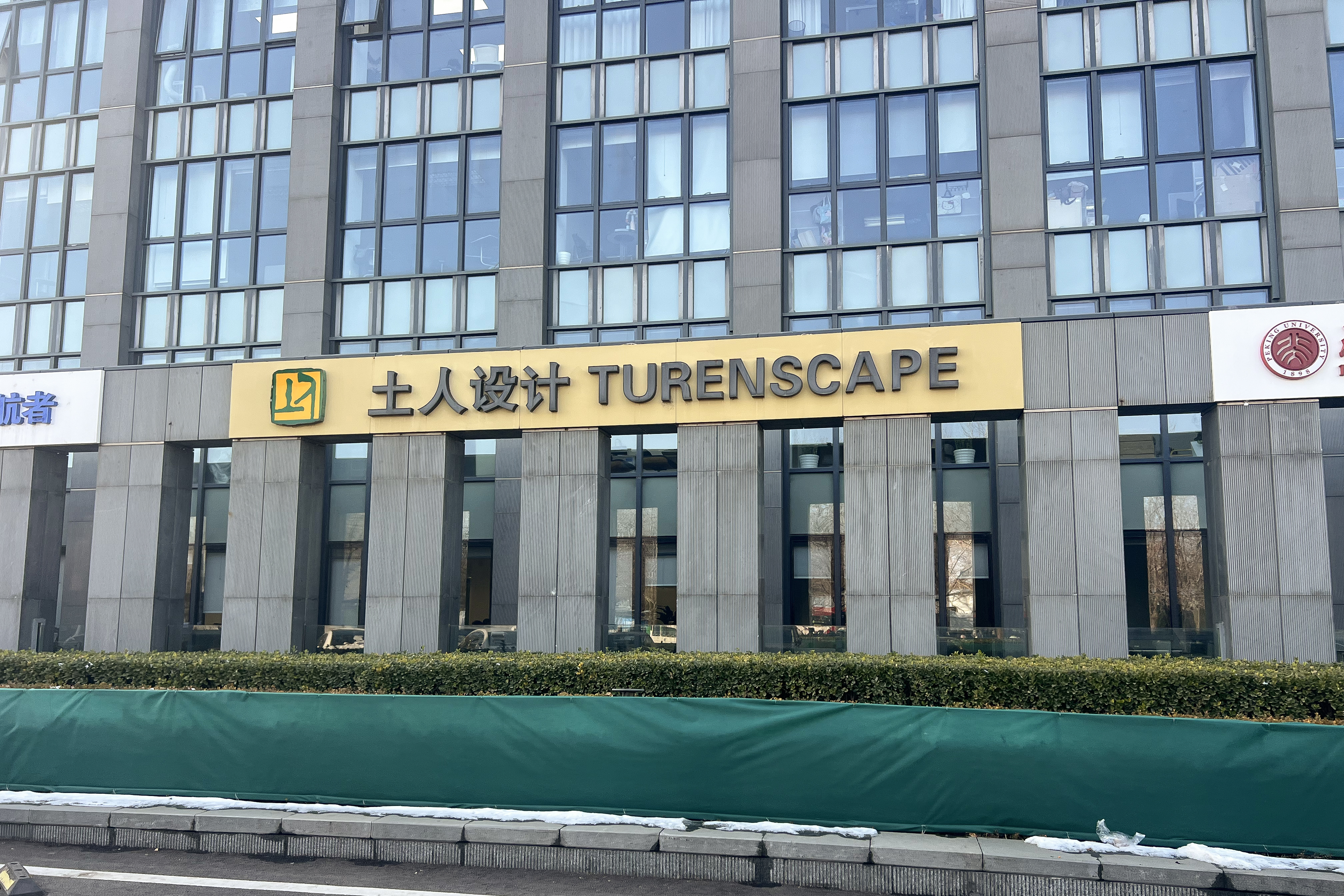
Turenscape, a design firm established by Yu in 1998

After returning to China in 1997, Yu joined Peking University, where he established the College of Architecture and Landscape Architecture and served as its dean. His research focuses on ecological planning, climate resilience, and flood mitigation. He returned to teach at Harvard as visiting professor from 2010 to 2014.

Yu has published over 300 academic papers and 20 books on topics such as landscape urbanism, green infrastructure, and sponge cities. He also founded the journal Landscape Architecture Frontiers, which explores nature-based solutions for urban resilience. His theories and designs have influenced policy-making and environmental planning in China and internationally.

In 1998, Yu founded Turenscape, an interdisciplinary design firm focusing on landscape architecture, urban planning, architecture, and ecological restoration, which Fast Company called one of The 10 Most Innovative Architecture Companies of 2021 for "balancing China's hyperspeed urbanization with green sponge cities." Under his leadership, Turenscape has completed over 1000 projects in over 200 cities, integrating traditional Chinese water management techniques with modern urban planning.

Yu's design philosophy is rooted in the idea of ecological security patterns and adaptive urbanism. He advocates for the "Big Feet Revolution", a concept that prioritizes resilience, functionality, and sustainability over ornamental aesthetics and defined landscape and urban design as the Art of Survival.

Yu's Sponge City concept is a nature-based approach to urban water management, designed to mitigate flooding, improve water quality, and enhance biodiversity. Instead of relying on concrete drainage systems, Sponge Cities use wetlands, permeable surfaces, and green spaces to absorb, filter, and store rainwater.

Yu argued that prevailing climate strategies focus predominantly on carbon, while largely overlooking the destabilized water cycle that intensifies disasters and accelerates climate change. He criticized current adaptation strategies—heavily reliant on grey infrastructure—as short-sighted and inadequate. In contrast, he proposed that nature-based ecological infrastructure could help reverse this trend. Yu defined the Sponge City as a holistic response to the climate crisis, far surpassing a narrow focus on urban flood management. He later expanded the concept globally through the 'Sponge Planet' approach, advocating for the ecological restoration of wetlands, rivers, and coastal zones to recover and stabilize the global water cycle—positioning it as a comprehensive, nature-based solution for both climate mitigation and adaptation.

== Death ==
On 23 September 2025, Kongjian Yu and three other people died when a small plane crashed in the rural area of Aquidauana, in the Pantanal region of the Brazilian state of Mato Grosso do Sul. He was 62. Yu was in the country for the 14th International Architecture Biennale of São Paulo, which was happening at the time.

== Notable projects ==
- Haikou Meishe River Restoration – A degraded urban river transformed into a dynamic waterway that mitigates flooding, improves water quality, and integrates green spaces
- Haikou Jiangdong Beach Park – Features a "breathing seawall", a nature-based coastal defense against erosion
- Bangkok Benjakitti Forest Park，Thailand Bangkok（2022）https://www.tclf.org/benjakitti-forest-park
- Nanchang Fishtail Park, Nanchang, Jiangxi Province (2021)https://www.tclf.org/nanchang-fish-tail-park
- Xi'an Yannan Park, Xi'an, Shanxi https://www.asla.org/2024awards/9530.html, https://journal.hep.com.cn/laf/EN/10.15302/J-LAF-1-040033
- Kaban Lake Waterfront: Revitalizing Kazan's Prime Waterfront (2018)(2019 APA International Planning Excellence Award, Grand Award for Urban Design/Kevin Lynch Award，American Planning Association https://mooool.com/en/revitalizing-kazans-prime-waterfront-russia-by-turenscape.html
- Sanya Mangrove Park: Form Follows Processes (2016) (2019 AZ Awards, Best Landscape Architecture, AZURE Magazine; 2020 ASLA Award. https://www.asla.org/2020awards/178.html
- Sanya Dong'an Wetland Park, Sanya, Hainan, 2016. https://www.tclf.org/sanya-dongan-wetland-park；Kongjian Yu，2022，Sanya Dong'an Wetland Park, Hainan, China, In： Landscape Architecture for Sea Level Rise, Routledge，eBook ISBN 9781003183419
- Puyangjiang River Corridor：Building a Greenway,(2016)(2019 FuturArc Green Leadership Award,) https://journal.hep.com.cn/laf/EN/article/downloadArticleFile.do?attachType=PDF&id=22139
- Chengtoushan Archaeological Park: Peasants and their Land, The Recovered Landscape of an ancient city (2016)（WAF Landscape of The Year Award，2017 World Architecture Festival）https://www.dezeen.com/2017/11/17/chengtoushan-archaeological-park-world-landscape-of-the-year-2017/
- Quzhou Luming Park: Framing Terrain and Water(2015)(2016 ASLA Honor Award) https://journal.hep.com.cn/laf/EN/Y2016/V4/I5/102
- Yanweizhou Park in Jinhua City:A Flood Adaptive Landscape (2014)(WAF Landscape of the year Award，2015 World Architecture Festival) https://landezine.com/a-resilient-landscape-yanweizhou-park-in-jinhua-city-by-turenscape/
- Liupanshui Minghu Wetland Park:Slow Dow(2012)(2014 ASLA Honor Award) https://www.asla.org/2014awards/002.html
- Qunli Stormwater Park：A Green Sponge for a Water-Resilient City (2011) (2012 ASLA Award of Excellence) https://www.archdaily.com/590066/minghu-wetland-park-turenscape, https://www.asla.org/2012awards/026.html
- Qian'an Sanlihe Greenway:A Mother River Recovered (2010)(2013 ASLA Honor Award) https://www.asla.org/2013awards/062.html
- Shanghai Houtan Park: Landscape as a living system(2009)(2010 ASLA Award of Excellence) https://www.asla.org/2010awards/006.html
- Tianjin Qiaoyuan Park：The Adaptation Palette s(2008)(2010 ASLA Honor Award) https://www.asla.org/2010awards/033.html
- Qinhuangdao Beach Restoration:An Ecological Surgery(2008)(2010 ASLA Honor Award) https://www.asla.org/2010awards/033.html
- Qinhuangdao Red Ribbon ParK:Minimum Intervention To Create an Urban Greenway(2006) (2007 ASLA Design Honor Award) https://www.tclf.org/landscapes/qinhuangdao-red-ribbon-park
- Yongning River Park:The Floating Gardens (2005) (2006 ASLA Design Honor Award)
- The Growth Pattern of Taizhou City Based on Ecological Infrastructure(2004) (2005 ASLA Honor Award) https://www.world-architects.com/en/turenscape-haidian-district-beijing/project/the-floating-gardens-yongning-river-park
- Shenyang Jianzhu University Campus, Shenyang City, Liaoning Province, China(2003) (2005 ASLA Design Honor Award) https://www.asla.org/awards/2005/05winners/090.html
- Zhongshan Shipyard Park: Value the ordinary (2001) (2002, ASLA Design Honor Award) https://www.tclf.org/zhongshan-shipyard-park

== Awards and honours ==
Kongjian Yu has received recognition for his contributions to landscape architecture and ecological urbanism. In 2023, he was awarded the Cornelia Hahn Oberlander International Landscape Architecture Prize, praised by the jury for being "exceptionally talented, creative, courageous, and visionary".

Yu's previous awards include the Sir Geoffrey Jellicoe Award in 2020, the highest honor from the International Federation of Landscape Architects, recognizing lifetime achievements with lasting societal impacts. Yu has been awarded honorary doctorates by the Norwegian University of Life Sciences in 2019 and Sapienza University of Rome in 2017 for his contributions to sustainable landscape practices and ecological infrastructure development. In 2016, he was elected an International Honorary Member of the American Academy of Arts and Sciences, recognizing his global impact in landscape architecture. Further honors include a Fellowship at the American Society of Landscape Architects in 2012, and several awards in China recognizing his achievements, including the National Gold Medal of Fine Arts awarded by the Chinese Cultural Ministry in 2004.

== Books ==
- Yu，Kongjian (2016) Sponge City: Theory and Practice (2016)，ISBN 9787112194896.
- Yu, Kongjian (2019). Ideal Landscapes and the Deep Meaning of Feng-Shui: Patterns of Biological and Cultural Genes. CA, USA: Novato. ISBN 978-1-943532-75-9.
- Yu, Kongjian; Li, Dihua (2012). China National Ecological Security Patterns. Beijing, China: China Architecture & Building Press. ISBN 9787112136841.
- Yu, Kongjian; Li, Dihua; Li, Hailong; Zhang, Lei (2012). The Grand Canal National Heritage and Ecological Corridor. Beijing, China: Peking University Press. ISBN 9787301202036.
- Yu, Kongjian; Wang, Sisi; Li, Dihua (2011). Regional Ecological Security patterns, The Beijing Case. Beijing, China: China Architecture & Building Press. ISBN 9787112136636.
- Yu, Kongjian (2009). Back to Land. Beijing, China: Commercial Press. ISBN 9787108030801.
- Yu, Kongjian (2006). Art of Survival: Positioning Contemporary Landscape Architecture. Beijing, China: China Architecture & Building Press. ISBN 9787112087365.
- Gary Austin; Kongjian Yu (2016). Constructed Wetlands and Sustainable Development. London: Routledge. ISBN 978-1138908994.
- Saunders, William S. (2012). Designed Ecologies: The Landscape Architecture of Kongjian Yu. Berlin: Birkhaeuser. ISBN 978-3034607384.
- Yu, Kongjian; Mary Padua (2007). Art of Survival: Recovering Landscape Architecture. Mulgrave, Victoria, 3170 Australia: Images Publishing Group Pty Ltd. ISBN 978-1864702514.

== Publications about Kongjian Yu and Turenscape ==
=== Books ===
- Shioppa, Caterina Padoa; Yu, Kongjian (2019). Turenscape 1998–2018. Melfi, Italy: Libria. ISBN 9788867641727.
- Terreform (2018). Letters to the Leaders of China: Kongjian Yu and the Future of the Chinese City. New York, USA: Terreform. ISBN 978-0-9960041-8-3.
- Saunders, William (2012). Designed Ecologies: The Landscape Architecture of Kongjian Yu. Basel, Switzerland: BirkhÃuser Architecture. ISBN 978-3034607384.
