= Avant-Garde and Kitsch =

1939 essay by Clement Greenberg

"Avant-Garde and Kitsch" is the title of a 1939 essay by Clement Greenberg, first published in the Partisan Review, in which he claimed that avant-garde and modernist art was a means to resist the "dumbing down" of culture caused by consumerism.

The term "kitsch" came into use in the 1860s or 1870s in Germany's street markets, and referred to pictures that were cheap, popular, and marketable. Greenberg considers kitsch to be "ersatz culture," a simulacrum of high culture that adopts many of its exterior trappings but none of its subtleties.

== Key ideas ==
Greenberg believed that the avant-garde arose in order to defend aesthetic standards from the decline of taste perpetuated by the mass-production of consumer society, and saw kitsch and art as opposites.

Kitsch is representational art, while Avant-Guard captures abstract concepts. Kitsch is easily accessible and sentimental artwork with a predisposed response, which has additionally allowed it to be utilized in political propaganda.

One of his more controversial claims was that kitsch was equivalent to Academic art: "All kitsch is academic, and conversely, all that is academic is kitsch." He argued this based on the fact that Academic art, such as that in the 19th century, was heavily centered in rules and formulations that were taught and tried to make art into something learnable and easily expressible. He later came to withdraw from his position of equating the two, as it became heavily criticized.

Greenberg’s argument stated that the rise of kitsch was closely connected to industrialization and the growing demand for mass-produced culture. Unlike avant-garde art, which encourages experimentation and requires viewers to actively interpret its meaning, kitsch relies on familiar imagery, recognizable emotions, and established artistic formulas. Greenberg believed that avant-garde artists focused on the process and techniques of creating art, while kitsch focused on producing for immediate emotional satisfaction. He also recognized that avant-garde art depended on wealthy patrons for financial support, despite its attempts to separate itself from mainstream society. His argument raises questions about whether artistic quality should be determined by originality and complexity or whether accessibility and popular appeal can also contribute to artistic value.

== Sources ==
- Greenberg, Clement. Art and Culture. Beacon Press, 1961
- Greenberg, Clement. Homemade Esthetics: Observations on Art and Taste. Oxford University Press, 1999.
- Rubenfeld, Florence. Clement Greenberg: A Life. Scribner, 1997.
