= Charles Morris Anderson =

American landscape architect (born 1957)

Charles Anderson
- Born: 1957 (age 68–69); Valley City, North Dakota, U.S.
- Education: BLA Washington State University; MLA Harvard University Graduate School of Design
- Occupation: Architect
- Practice: "WERK.us".
- Projects: Anchorage Museum of History and Art, Anchorage, AK; American Museum of natural History, Arthur Ross Terrace, New York, NY; International Peace Gardens, Dunseith, ND; Project Phoenix, Cite Soleil, Haiti; Seattle Art Museum, Olympic Sculpture Park, Seattle, WA; Trillium Projects, Seattle, WA

Charles Morris Anderson (born 1957) is an American landscape architect and fellow of the American Society of Landscape Architects. He is the principal of Charles Anderson Landscape Architecture, a Phoenix-based firm that continues his practice from the Seattle-based firm of the same name. In 2026 he received the Honor of, The Coliton Visiting Professor of Landscape Architecture at North Dakota State University.

Anderson is recognized by the American Society of Landscape Architects for his ability to combine nature, community needs, and art in his designs. He emphasizes sustainability, the use of indigenous plants, and urban ecology.

== Influences ==
Anderson's influences and contemporaries include Peter Walker, affiliated with the team involved in the World Trade Center Memorial project; Richard Haag, famous for his Gas Works Park project in Seattle; and Cornelia Oberlander, a Canadian landscape architect renown for the creative use of native plants on landmark projects like the Museum of Anthropology at UBC

Anderson also had a special interest in the work of Robert Smithson, an influential artist of the 1960s and 1970s, James Turrell, a contemporary artist who focuses on light and space, and Julie Bargmann, who focuses on regenerative landscapes.

== Charles Anderson, FASLA ==
Charles Anderson, a distinguished landscape architect, has made significant contributions to both national and international projects. One of his notable projects is the Seattle Museum of Art, Olympic Sculpture Park, and the Ellinikon Project in Athens, Greece. This project include Metropolitan Park spanning 500 acres, an additional 200 acres of open space, and a mile of coastline. Anderson's involvement started with winning the competition in 2013 through project initial permitting in 2018, the site is the former Athens International Airport, Ellinikon Metropolitan Park.

Anderson’s portfolio also includes national and international projects, such as those in China, South Korea, Mexico, Canada, and Vietnam. Dalian Discovery Kingdom, International Peace Garden, North Dakota, and Canada.

Other significant projects by Anderson include providing landscape design for the Anchorage Museum expansion, Seattle’s Olympic Sculpture Park (8.5 acres or 3.4 hectares), Mount St. Helens National Volcanic Monument, and Manhattan’s Arthur Ross Terrace. American Museum History, Arthur Ross Terrace, and the University of Oregon’s John E. Jaqua Center for Student Athletes, Ivy Station transit-oriented development, and Ivy Station, Los Angeles.

In addition to these larger projects, Anderson has also contributed to neighborhood park projects, including the Roxhill Wetland and Bog Park in West Seattle and the restoration of the 500 Area of Discovery Park. Both of these projects received Merit Awards from the Washington Chapter of the American Society of Landscape Architects.

== Recognition ==
The American Society of Landscape Architects (ASLA) awarded Anderson for his designs in the Tables of Water in Lake Washington (Washington State), the Mount Saint Helens National Volcanic Monument project, the Trillium Projects in Seattle, and the Arthur Ross Terrace design in Manhattan, New York, the Olympic Sculpture Park (4), Seattle, WA, and an ASLA National Honor Award for Rabbit House in Denver, Colorado, Rabbit House Numerous ASLA State Chapter awards.

The Washington State Chapter of the American Society of Landscape Architects inducted Anderson into the Council of Fellows in 2006. Peter Walker, Peter Walker (landscape architect), escorted him to receive the honor.

== Emo Urbanism (Big Nature) ==
Anderson has defined his emerging design theory as “Emo Urbanism.” It is differentiated from other conceptual processes with a focus on art, culture, ecology, and the fourth dimension. He emphasizes authentic landscape—habitat and complete ecosystems—within an ordered human environment. His work on the Olympic Sculpture Park in Seattle, WA is an example of this with its paradigm shift in nature/human interaction. Anderson's stroke introduced entropic organization along Seattle's Elliott Bay. His intervention created a native ecosystem responsive to flora, fauna, and the hard lines of existing infrastructure. Anderson made vital the natural processes that sustain a dynamic, human centered world.

The quality produced through Emo Urbanism is paramount to the tangible connection of person to place. Anderson has described this connection as the “thinness.” It is the simultaneous perception and implicit understanding of the past, present, and future. Excellent design will achieve this in a manner that is simple, immediate, and direct. Anderson believes that its traditional counterpart, “context,” is often just a justification to make a designer's brand fit the site. Within Emo Urbanism, the brand is created from thinness. The result can embrace or contrast the physical manifestation of place, but it must always produce a unique fingerprint.

In contemporary urban planning, rooftops are increasingly used to provide green spaces and outdoor amenities in densely developed cities. The concept of "Big Nature" refers to an approach that incorporates sustainable landscapes, including vegetation based on indigenous or locally adapted species, into rooftop environments. Rather than seeking to reproduce natural ecosystems in their original form, the approach integrates elements of these landscapes into the urban environment. Such rooftop habitats may also provide suitable conditions for local wildlife.

The critical theory of Emo Urbanism was the basis for a seminar of the same name at the Arizona State University in 2012 and 2013.

== Urbanature ==
Anderson defines the practice of Emo Urbanism as “urbanature.” In practice, he differentiates between the wilderness and wildness. Henry David Thoreau held that “in wildness is the preservation of the world.” Urbanature implements wildness—the authentic landscape—within the urban environment. Urbanature demonstrates that nature does not exist solely in an untouched wilderness. Ashton Nichols, a professor of English Language and Literature at Dickinson College, first developed the term in relation to ecocriticism and how people perceive the world around them. He states that “the interconnectedness demanded by urbanature insists that human beings are not out of nature when they stand in the streets of Manhattan any more than they are in nature when they stand in the mountain above tree-line in Montana." Urbanature provides the tangible benefits of nature in an environment not traditionally thought of as appropriate. A clear example can be seen in Project Phoenix, an in progress soccer stadium in Haiti. Here Charles has composed a landscape entirely of edibles and a lake containing tilapia for consumption. Composting and recycling facilities are also integrated. Anderson contends that the landscape cannot just be an aesthetic tool, it must also provide for the mental, physical, and social health of people regardless of where they live.

Anderson's award-winning urbanature includes the Alaska Museum of History and Art, the Olympic Sculpture Park, and Trillium Projects and can be seen throughout his monograph, “Wandering Ecologies.”
