= Rare (conservation organization) =

- Founded: 1973 (53 years ago)
- Founder: David Hill
- Type: Nonprofit organization
- Purpose: Conservation, behavior change, community-based natural resource management
- Headquarters: Arlington, Virginia, United States
- Region served: Global
- Key people: Brett Jenks (CEO); Caleb McClennen (President)
- Website: www.rare.org

Rare (originally the Rare Animal Relief Effort) is a U.S.-based environmental nonprofit organization founded in 1973 and headquartered in Arlington, Virginia. The organization develops conservation programs focused on behavior change and community-based natural resource management.

Rare operates internationally through partnerships and programs in multiple countries, particularly in regions dependent on small-scale fisheries and local natural resources. Its initiatives include Pride campaigns to encourage communities to protect local natural resources and Fish Forever, a program that supports community-based fisheries management.

Rare Inc. is a tax-exempt 501(c)(3) organization in the United States and has held this status since 1985. Charity Navigator has assigned the organization a four-star rating.

== History ==
Rare was founded in 1973 by David Hill.

Rare’s early work included conservation campaigns focused on local species and community engagement. Rare's approach was inspired by a project that took place in Saint Lucia, led by conservationist Paul Butler and the country’s Forestry Department to raise awareness of the Saint Lucia amazon (Amazona versicolor), a parrot species that was then at risk. Paul Butler helped lead outreach efforts, engaging local communities through schools, media, and public campaigns. The campaign later came to be seen as an early example of the community-based approach that shaped Rare’s broader conservation work.

By the 2010s, Rare had expanded its work internationally, applying similar approaches to marine and coastal resource management. In 2014, Rare, the Environmental Defense Fund, and researchers at the University of California, Santa Barbara collaborated on the Fish Forever initiative, combining territorial fishing rights with no-take marine reserves in countries including Belize, the Philippines, Indonesia, Brazil, and Mozambique.

In 2018, Rare expanded its fisheries work with support from Bloomberg Philanthropies, focusing on strengthening community-based coastal management.

A 2019 review in Trends in Ecology & Evolution identified Rare’s Pride campaigns as an example of conservation interventions that use social networks and trusted community messengers to influence behavior.

== The Center for Behavior & the Environment ==
Rare launched the Center for Behavior & the Environment (BE.Center) in 2017 to apply behavioral science and design approaches to environmental challenges.

The center works with environmental practitioners to incorporate behavior-centered design into conservation, climate adaptation, and resource management programs. Its work draws on research in the behavioral and social sciences, as well as on design-based methods, to support interventions that aim to influence environmental decision-making and everyday practices.

A 2020 article in Stanford Social Innovation Review described a project in which Rare worked with Stanford University to use design thinking to help onion farmers in Colombia respond to climate-related uncertainty.
