= Robert Langbaum =

American writer (1924–2020)

Robert Woodrow Langbaum (February 23, 1924 – March 10, 2020) was an American author. He was University of Virginia James Branch Cabell professor of English and American literature (1967–99) and professor emeritus from 1999.

== Biography ==
Robert Langbaum, English literature educator and literary critic, was born February 23, 1924, son of Murray and Nettie (Moskowitz) Langbaum. Langbaum married Francesca Levi Vidale, November 5, 1950; one child Donata Emily, 1956. Langbaum was born in Brooklyn, NY, and grew up in Forest Hills, Queens. From 1936 to 1940, he attended Newtown High School where in 1939 he met Francesca, who with her family immigrated from Italy after the Fascist government began persecuting Jews.

Langbaum began his undergraduate studies at Cornell, with tuition scholarships, in 1940. After America’s entry into World War II, he left at the end of his sophomore year to study Japanese at New York University. In 1942 he enlisted in the US Army Military Intelligence to be trained as a Japanese translator and interrogator, achieving the rank of 1st Lieutenant. After Japan’s surrender in 1945, he with a small group from his unit were sent to Japan to find documents for war crimes trials and to bring back 2nd copies of Japanese library books for the Library of Congress. In 1947 he returned to Cornell for a semester to obtain his B. A. degree. He then, with the help of the GI bill, began studies at Columbia University for his M. A. and PhD in English Literature, where he was influenced by Lionel Trilling and Jacques Barzun. He obtained his PhD in 1954 while working as an Instructor at Cornell.

From 1955–60, Langbaum served as Assistant Professor at Cornell. He then moved to the University of Virginia, where he held the positions of Associate Professor of English (1960–63), Professor of English (1963–67), and James Branch Cabell Professor of English and American Literature (1967–99). He was a Visiting Professor at Columbia during the summer of 1960 and the academic year 1965–66; at Harvard in the summer of 1965; and Fellow at Clare Hall, Cambridge, in 1978.

Langbaum has delivered lectures at the Wordsworth Summer Conference (1974–78), at the University of Bern in Geneva (1979), in Israel in 1979, at the Browning Centennial Conference at Baylor University (1989), and at the First International Academic Conference on James Joyce in China (1996). In 1988, he lectured in Japan, Taiwan and Hong Kong in 1988 for the United States Information Agency. He has received fellowships from the Center for Advanced Study at Stanford University (1961–62), the John Simon Guggenheim Memorial Foundation (1969–70), the National Endowment for the Humanities (1972–73), the University of Virginia Center for Advanced Studies (1982), and the Rockefeller Foundation Bellagio Center (1987), and grants from American Council of Learned Societies (1961, 1975–76). He died on March 10, 2020.

== Books ==
Langbaum’s first book, The Poetry of Experience: The Dramatic Monologue in Modern Literary Tradition (1957), takes issue with T. S. Eliot whom he admires as poet and critic. He objects, however, to Eliot’s redrawing of the literary tradition as beginning with the early seventeenth-century witty poets and the witty side of Shakespeare. Eliot names this tradition a poetry of wit that continues into the early eighteenth century and on into the twentieth century poetry. He skips over the nineteenth century as an interruption. Langbaum instead defines a longer tradition beginning with the “romantic” side of Shakespeare (e.g. Hamlet), the romantic nineteenth century into the twentieth century. He shows that Eliot’s early poetry (Prufrock, The Waste Land) is romantic, and that his poetry as a whole, despite his claim of objectivity, is mainly autobiographical. Langbaum uses the developing dramatic monologue as an example of what he calls in his first chapter, “Romanticism as a Modern Tradition.” The Poetry of Experience has been reprinted in several paperback editions, in a Spanish translation (1996), and is now an e-book.

In 1964 Langbaum published an edition of Shakespeare’s The Tempest with his introduction. Since The Tempest is Shakespeare’s last play, Langbaum in his introduction sees it as “the appropriate statement of age, of the writer who having seen it all and mastered all techniques can teach us that the profoundest statement is the lightest and that life, when you see through it, is gay, tragicomically gay.” In that same year Langbaum published The Gayety of Vision: Isak Dinesen’s Art. Isak Dinesen (pen name for Karen Blixen) was also an old writer. She was 49 when in 1934 she published her first volume of stories, Seven Gothic Tales, which in its lightness of surface covering serious content demonstrates the tragicomic vision. Out of Africa, the book for which she is best known, was also published in 1934, though it recollects a much earlier period, the many years in which she managed a coffee farm in Kenya. This recollected experience, which omits many details of what really happened, gives the book its artistic shape.

In his collection of essays, The Modern Spirit: Essays on the Continuity of Nineteenth and Twentieth Century Literature, Langbaum has an essay called “The New Nature Poetry,” which argues that nature poetry is still alive but in a new guise. “Our nature philosophy” he writes, “has been made not only by Darwin but by Freud and Frazer. It connects our mind and culture to the primeval ooze.” This explains the effort of twentieth century poets try to be as nonanthropomorphic as possible, using animals rather than Wordsworthian landscapes for their symbols of nature. Wordsworth omits from his nature poetry, nature’s most powerful force, sexuality. Wordsworth portrays unconsciousness, but not the sexually charged primeval unconsciousness represented by animals. This argument is continued by the title of Langbaum’s second collection of essays, The Word from Below (1987). Quoting Blake’s “Does the Eagle know what is in the pit?/ Or wilt thou go ask the Mole?,” he suggests that the energy of the pit can propel men/women to their highest achievements.

Langbaum’s The Mysteries of Identity (1977) traces the nineteenth and twentieth century engagement with that mysterious coherence called the self. The best way to describe the book is by quoting the Table of Contents. Part I, THE ROMANTIC SELF. Chapter 1, Wordsworth: The Self as Process. Part II, LOSS OF SELF. Chapter 2, Arnold: Waning Energy. Chapter 3, Eliot: The Walking Dead. Chapter 4, Beckett: Zero Identity. Part III, RECONSTITUTION OF SELF: YEATS THE RELIGION OF ART. Chapter 5, Exteriority of Self. Chapter 6, The Self as a Work of Art. Chapter 7, The Self as God. Part IV, RECONSTITUTION OF SELF: LAWRENCE THE RELIGION OF LOVE. Chapter 8, Identity and Sexuality. Chapter 9, The Rainbow: The Way Through Hope. Chapter 10, Women in Love: The Way Through Doom.

Thomas Hardy in Our Time (1995) is Langbaum’s last published book; he was writing memoirs. Langbaum argues that in his fiction, Thomas Hardy encapsulates Victorian accomplishments, but he carries them a step farther into the twentieth century. He retains the complex plots and rounded characterizations of Victorian fiction. But adds to Victorian social criticism a new intensity and an expansion of subject matter in, for example, his frank treatment of sexuality and the subjection of women through sexuality (Tess, 1891). Jude the Obscure (1895) is Hardy’s gloomiest and most revolutionary novel. Tess is revolutionary, but not as much as Jude in which Hardy lashes out at all the social arrangements of his time. Jude at the beginning is an intelligent, idealistic working-class young man who studies at home for admission to the University of Christminster (Oxford). In his innocence, he is seduced by Arabella and deceived into marriage by Arabella, the daughter of a pig farmer. Arabella leaves for Australia where she marries again, then returns to keep popping up in Jude’s life. Jude is rejected by Christminster because of his social class. At Christminster he meets there Sue Bridehead, a “modern” woman, intelligent, independent and therefore, according to the bias of the time, low in sexual energy. Since Jude is already married, they live together unmarried. When the landlady learns of this, she evicts them—a trauma for their oldest child who kills the other children and himself. Sue could have prevented the tragedy by assuring the child of her love, but Sue lacks instincts. Jude dies; Sue sacrifices herself in penance; Arabella survives. As a Darwinian Hardy ironically has to admire Arabella’s brash sexuality, unblinking realism, as contrasted to the idealism of Jude and Sue, and fitness for survival.

The unfavorable reception of Jude caused Hardy to return to his first love, poetry where he could safely express his atheism, feminism, Darwinism, and his opposition to hunting—safely because so few people read poetry. In his several volumes of verse, Hardy encapsulates Victorian poetry but passes on a plain diction and irony that has influenced many twentieth-century poets. There is much discussion as to whether Hardy is a major or minor poet. Langbaum argues that Hardy’s poetry is too good to be dismissed as minor, but that Hardy’s really major poetry is to be found in his novels.

== Works ==
- The Poetry of Experience: The Dramatic Monologue in Modern Literary Tradition, (New York, Random House) 1957 (Spanish trans. 1996) ISBN 0-7011-1852-0
- The Gayety of Vision: A Study of Isak Dinesen's Art (New York, Random House), 1965, (Danish trans. 1965), ISBN 0-226-46871-2
- The Modern Spirit: Essays on the Continuity of Nineteenth and Twentieth Century Literature, (New York, Oxford University Press) 1970, ISBN 0-7011-1615-3
- The Mysteries of Identity: A Theme in Modern Literature, (New York, Oxford University Press), 1977 ISBN 0-19-502189-4
- The Word From Below: Essays on Modern Literature and Culture, (Madison, U. of Wisconsin Press), 1987, ISBN 0-299-11184-9
- Thomas Hardy in Our Time, (New York, St Martin's Press), 1995 ISBN 0-312-16409-2
- Editor with an introduction: The Tempest (Shakespeare), (New York: Penguin Group), 1964 ISBN 0-451-52712-7
- Editor with an introduction: The Victorian Age: Essays in History and in Social and Literary Criticism, (New York, Fawcett World Library), 1967 ISBN 0-89733-055-2

== Lectures ==
- “The Mysteries of Identity in T. S. Eliot’s Plays,” Johns Hopkins U. (1971), U. of Kansas (1972)
- “Is Guido Saved? The Meaning of Browning’s Conclusion to The Ring and the Book,” MLA, Browning Society, Boston (1971)
- “The Art of Victorian Literature,” U. of Minnesota (1974), Stonybrook U., Duke U., U. of North Carolina (1976)
- Lectures at Wordsworth Conferences (1976, 1977, 1978)
- ”Transformations of Identity in Yeats,” U. of Iowa (1977)
- “Strange Points of View,” Browning Birthday Lecture, Baylor U., Texas (1978)
- “The Epiphanic Mode in Wordsworth’s Poetry,” U. of Texas, U. of Missouri (1978), U. of Geneva, Switzerland (1979)
- “The Art of Victorian Literature,” U. of Zurich, Lausanne, Switzerland (1979)
- BBC Broadcast on Isak Dinesen, London, UK (1979)
- “Frost and Hardy”, MLA, Langbaum Frost Society, (1980)
- “Hardy, Victorianism, Modernism,” CUNY, New York City (1982)
- “The Poetry of Experience 25 Years Later,” U. of Toronto, Canada (1982)
- “Ideas of Leadership in Shakespeare’s Coriolanus,” U. of Virginia (1982)
- “Pound and Eliot,” U. of Michigan (1983)
- “Victorian Religious Crisis,” Broadcast for Radio Canada (1984)
- “Can We Still Talk about The Romantic Self?” MLA (1984)
- “Ezra Pound and T. S Eliot: Friendship and Strife,” U. Kent State (1985)
- “Changes of Style, Thought and Feeling in T. S. Eliot’s Poetry,” Eliot Centennenial St. Louis, Mo. and Smithsonian, Washington, D. C. (1987)
- “Browning and Twentieth Century Poetry,” Conference Browning in Venice, Venice, Italy (1989)
- “Modern, Modernist, and Postmodernist Literature,” Texas A&M U., Baylor U., Texas (1988), U. of Verona, Italy (1989)
- lectured at James Joyce conference, China, (1990)
- “My Remiscences of Isak Dinesen,” U. of Wisconsin, (1992)
- “D. H. Lawrence and the Modernists,” Lawrence Conference, U. of Paris (1992)
- “Jude the Obscure,” U. of Georgia, (1995)

== Awards and honors ==
- Marquis Who's Who Award for Lifetime Achievement and for Works of Unwavering Excellence 2018
- The Wordsworth Circle: Special Issue in Honor of Robert Langbaum, Spring/Summer 2016
- Who's Who in the World from 2015
- Who's Who in America from 2012
- Phi Beta Kappa
- fellow Center for Advanced Study in the Behavioral Sciences, Stanford, Calif., 1961–62
- Guggenheim fellow, 1969–70
- Senior fellow National Endowment for the Humanities, 1972–73
- American Council of Learned Societies, grantee, 1961, 1975–76
- fellow Clare Hall, Cambridge U., UK, 1978
- fellow Center Advanced Study, U. of Virginia, 1982
- resident scholar, Rockefeller Foundation, Bellagio, Italy, 1987
- U.S. Information Service Lecturer, Taiwan, Japan, Hong Kong, 1988
