= Propeller speed reduction unit =

Mechanical device

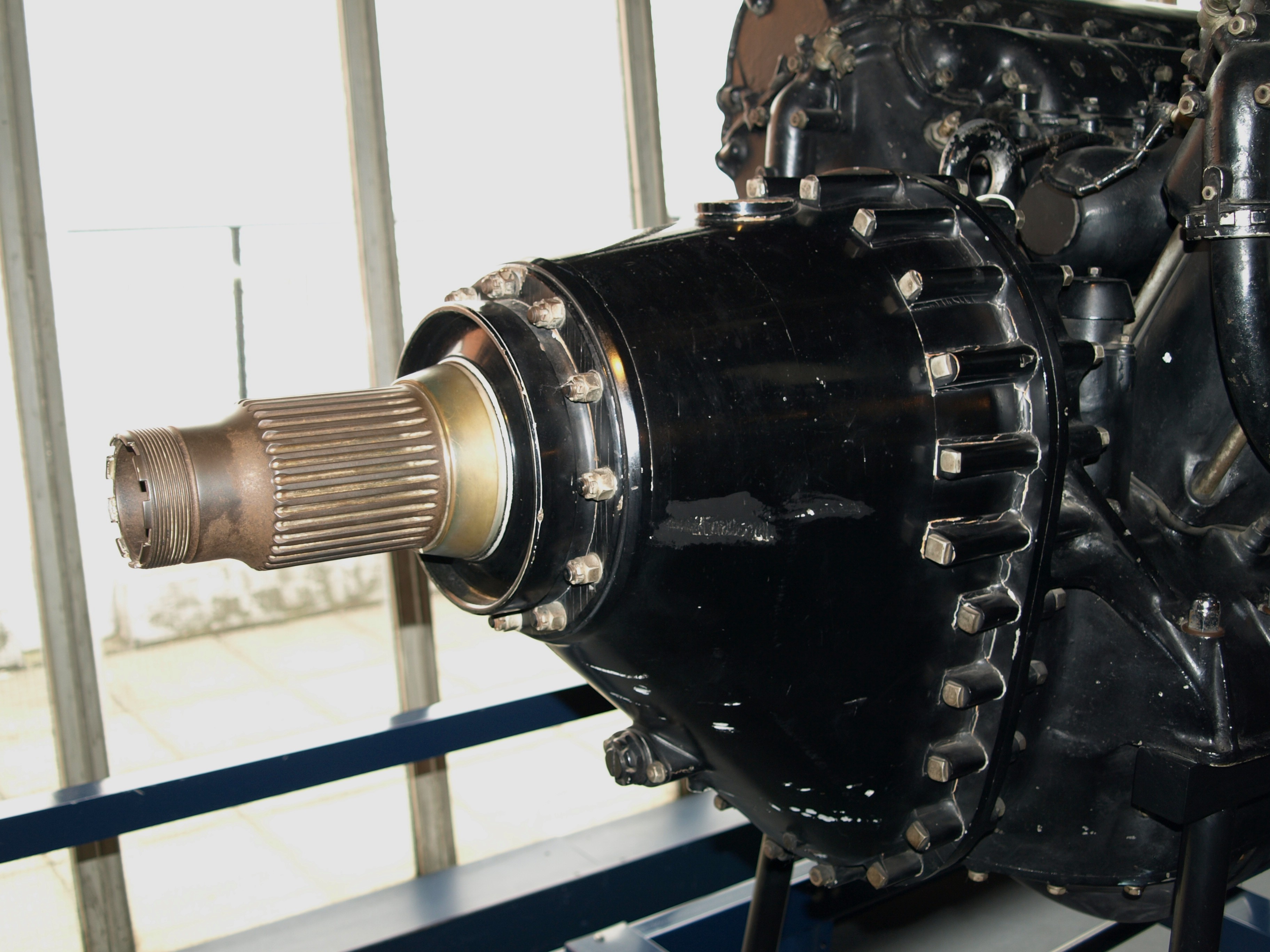
The propeller speed reduction unit of a Rolls-Royce R engine

A propeller speed reduction unit is a gearbox or a belt and pulley device used to reduce the output revolutions per minute (rpm) from the higher input rpm of the powerplant. This allows the use of small displacement internal combustion engines to turn aircraft propellers within an efficient speed range.

== History and operation ==
The Wright brothers recognised the need for propeller reduction gearing in 1903, but it was not generally used on aircraft engines until larger engines were designed in the 1920s. Large engines with high crankshaft speeds and power outputs demanded propeller reduction, pilots noted the increase in performance of similar aircraft fitted with reduction gearing.

=== Types ===
Simple spur gear reduction

Types of propeller speed reduction units include:

- Chain drive
- Single reduction or spur gear
- Internal spur gear
- Farman or bevel planetary type
- Fixed sun gear
- Fixed internal gear
- Belt drive
- Epicyclic gearing

=== Design variations ===
The Rolls-Royce Falcon engine of 1915 featured epicyclic propeller reduction gearing which contained a clutch designed to limit the maximum torque, thus protecting the reduction gears. The later Merlin engine from the same company used opposite rotation reduction gears to provide counter-rotating propellers for twin-engined aircraft, a much cheaper method than designing and building the engines to run in opposite directions.

The challenge with coupling gearboxes to internal combustion engines is primarily the torsional resonance that can develop at certain speeds. The load of a propeller and reduction unit can alter the resonant frequencies of the crankshaft, allowing torsional vibration to increase rapidly to high levels at certain rotational speeds. Measures taken by the designer to mitigate torsional resonances in the original design of the engine can be rendered ineffective if the resonant frequency is altered by the use of a reduction unit. Clutches and/or flexible couplings are sometimes used to prevent torsional resonance from reaching damaging levels.

The Continental Tiara series engines used a single gearset to drive both the propeller and the camshaft, this allowed the propeller to run at half the engine speed.

== Applications ==
The use of propeller reduction gearing was very common during the height of piston engine use in aviation (the 1930s through the 1940s), with essentially all of the most powerful piston engines ever built for use in aircraft being designed to make use of reduction gearing.

The use of a reduction unit is common in the construction of experimental homebuilt aircraft when automotive engines may be used. These engines, in addition to their lower cost, typically have less displacement than purpose-built light aircraft engines and develop peak power at high revolutions per minute (rpm), typically above 4,000 rpm. Traditional aircraft engines, where the propeller is most commonly fastened directly to the engine crankshaft, develop peak power near the peak safe and efficient speed for the propeller—2,500 to 3,000 rpm. This speed is considered the typical maximum rpm for a single-engine aircraft propeller due to the need to keep the propeller tip speed below the speed of sound.

Factory-certified aircraft engines have also used reduction units integral to their design. The Cessna 175 used a geared unit which is part of the Continental GO-300 engine while the Helio Courier and several Beechcraft twins, among others, used the geared Lycoming GO-435 and GO-480. Many light sport aircraft use engines from Rotax such as the Rotax 912 which incorporates a geared reducer.

== See also ==
- Ultralight
