= Aerofan =

Flight training group

IATA	ICAO	Call sign
-	CFF	Aerofan
- Hubs: Madrid Cuatro Vientos Airport
- Headquarters: Madrid, Spain
- Website: http://www.aerofanfto.com/

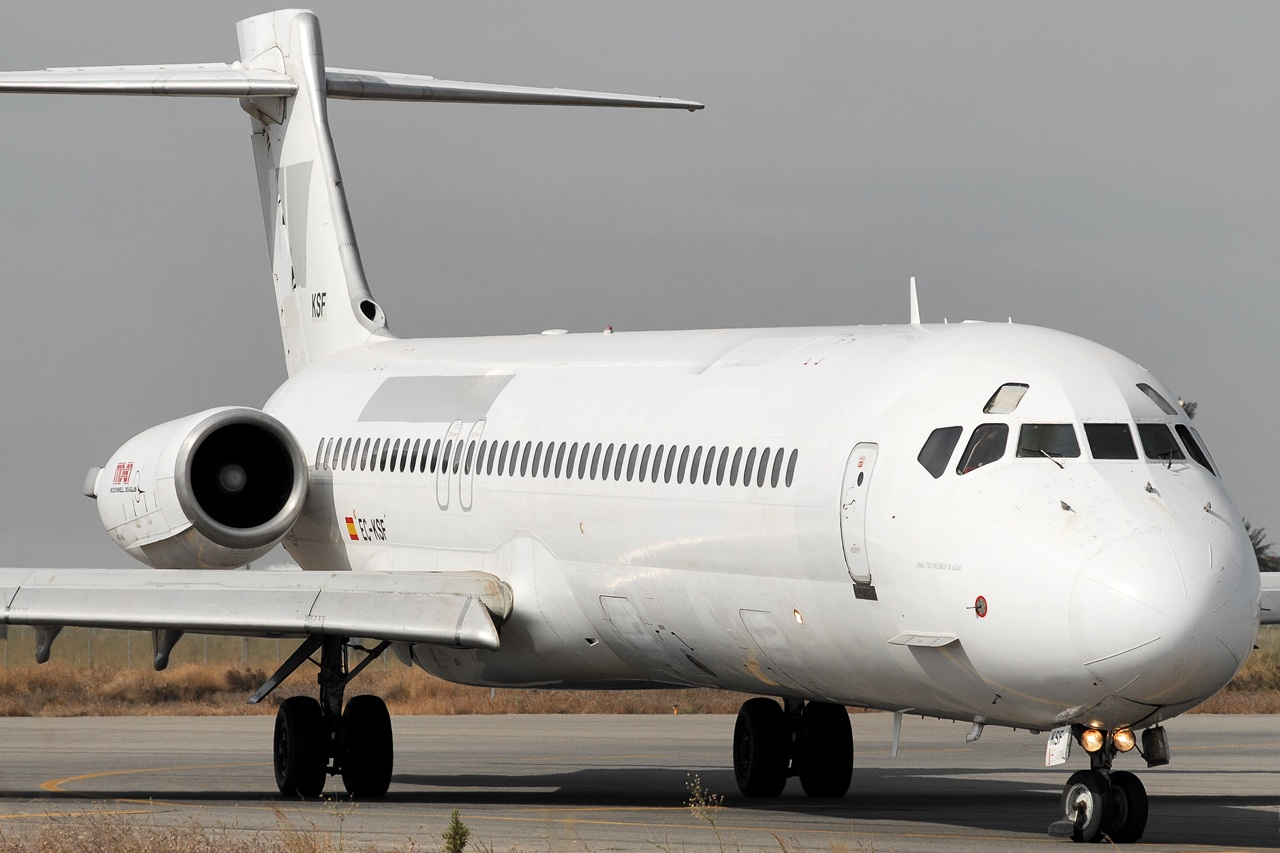
An Aerofan MD-87.

Owned and founded by Fernando González Sanchez, Aerofan FTO is an approved Flight Training Organisation, operating from Madrid Cuatro Vientos Airport, Spain. Aerofan FTO currently operates one Cessna 152, one Cessna 172 and one Cessna 310 multi-engine aircraft. The flying school is approved for private and commercial pilot training. Flight attendant courses are also available.

== History ==
Aerofan was founded in 1992 operating just one Cessna 152 for private pilot courses. Between 2002 and 2007 the flying school experienced several years of solid growth, largely due to its high percentage of non-Spanish students. During these years Aerofan FTO was one of the leading pilot schools in Spain focused on international flight training.

In 2009 owner Fernando González launched IMD Airways. For a period of two years IMD operated an MD87 in wet-lease operations. Since the launching of IMD, Aerofan FTO saw no further expansion or growth. Since 2011 Aerofan has seen a significant fleet reduction and now operates only three aircraft. Its other aircraft have all been sold, or scrapped.

IMD Airways operations have ceased. Aerofan however continues to operate.

== Fleet ==
The Aerofan fleet includes the following aircraft (as of 11 January 2012) :

FTO

- 1 Cessna 152
- 3 Cessna 172
- 1 Cessna 172RG
- 1 Cessna 310
- 1 Piper Seneca

Airline

- 1 MD-87
