= Cessna 175 Skylark =

American light aircraft

Cessna 175
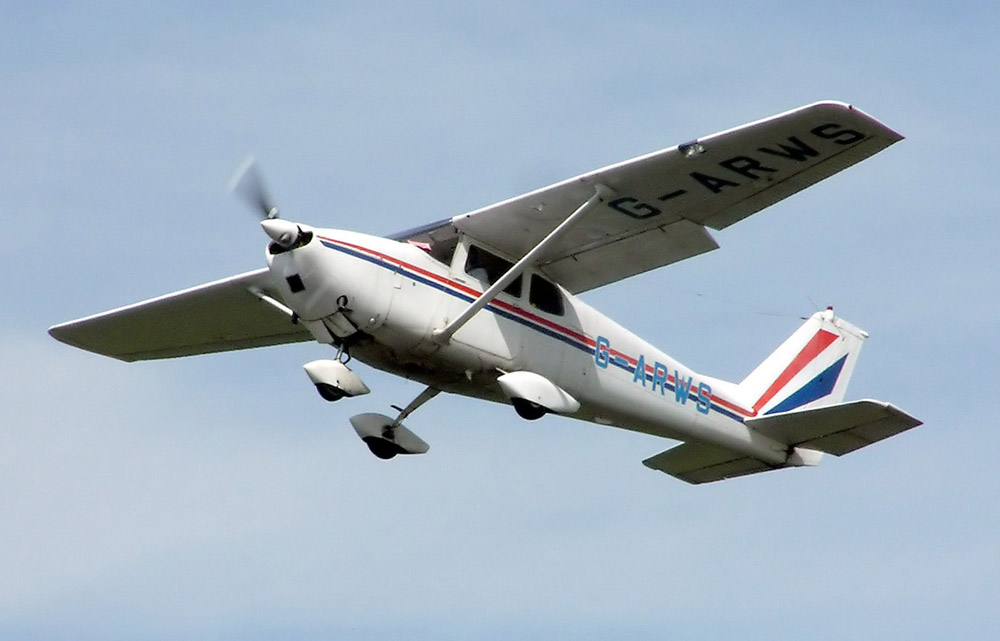
- Cessna 175A Skylark

General information
- Type: Light utility aircraft
- Manufacturer: Cessna Aircraft Company
- Number built: 2,108

History
- Manufactured: 1958–1962
- Introduction date: 1958
- First flight: April 23, 1956
- Developed from: Cessna 172
- Variant: Cessna R172

The Cessna 175 is a light four-seat, single-engine, fixed wing aircraft produced by Cessna between 1958 and 1962. A deluxe model known as the Skylark was introduced in 1959 for the 1960 model year. The aircraft is very similar to the popular Cessna 172, but has higher gross weight and used a more powerful version of its engine with a geared reduction drive, achieving higher performance. The Cessna 175 sat between the Cessna 172 and the larger Cessna 182 in the product line at its debut.

Declining sales stemming from reputedly poor engine reliability prompted Cessna to drop the 175 and Skylark nameplates, but the company continued to produce 175-based R172 aircraft for several decades, selling them as variants of the 172 and as a military trainer aircraft, the T-41 Mescalero.

== Production history ==
The 175 was designed to fill a niche between the Cessna 172 and the slightly heavier, larger and faster Cessna 182. The engine of the 175, a reduction drive or geared version of the O-300 (Continental GO-300) used in the 172, is rated at 175 hp (130 kW), or 30 hp (22 kW) more than the engine offered in the contemporary 172. Between 1958 and 1962, a total of 2,106 were built. The basic airplane was marketed as the 175, and the plane with a package of optional equipment and overall paint (a partial paint scheme was used on the basic model) was marketed as the Skylark.

== Design ==
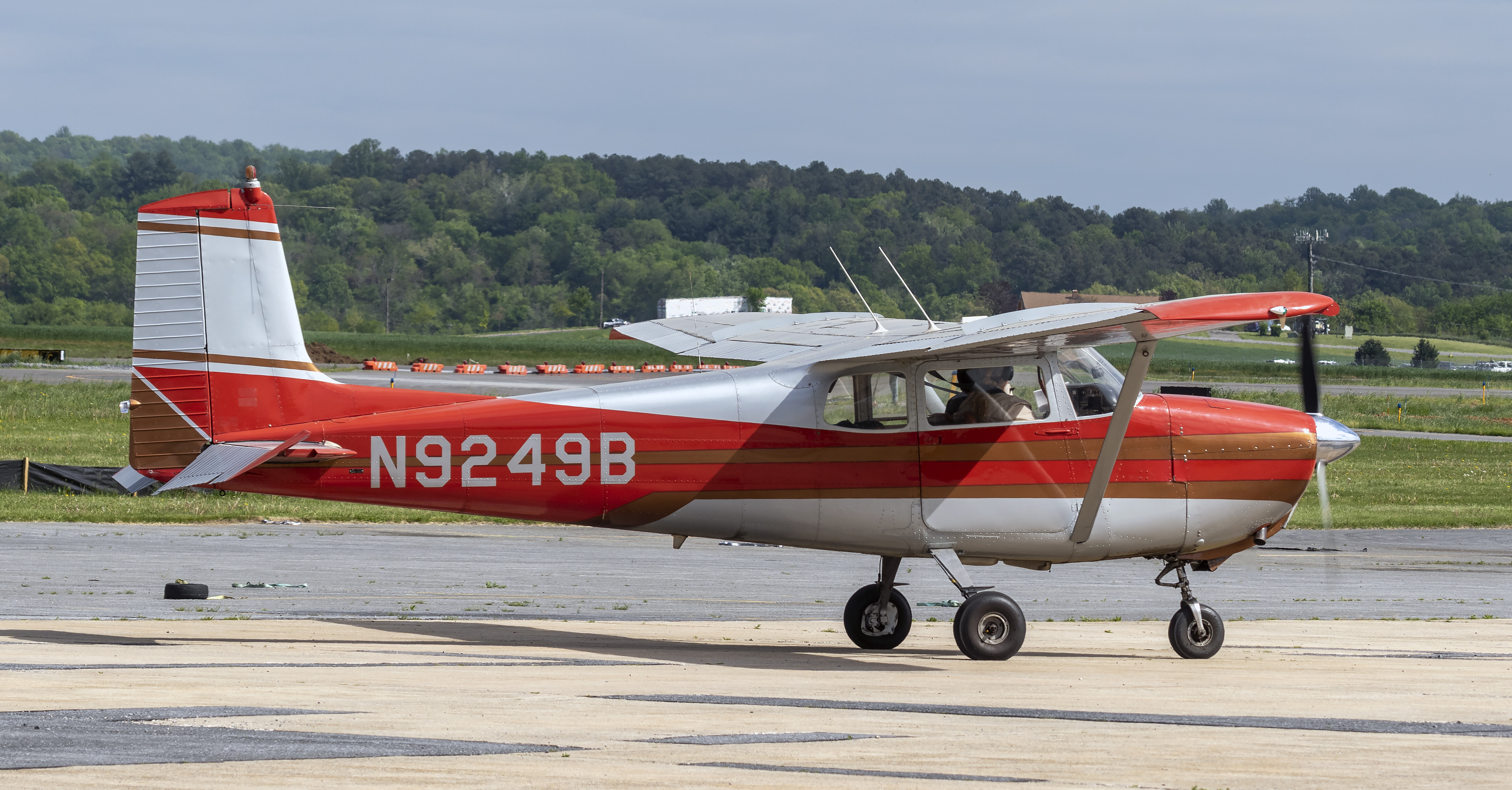
Cessna 175 taxiing at Frederick Municipal Airport, Maryland, USA

The airframe of the 175 is all metal, constructed of aluminum alloy. The fuselage is a semi-monocoque structure, with exterior skin sheets riveted to formers and longerons. The strut-braced high wings are constructed of exterior skins riveted to spars and ribs. The 175 has fixed landing gear in a tricycle arrangement, with main gear legs made of spring steel, and a steerable nosewheel connected through an oleo strut for shock absorption.

While it incorporates airframe changes to accommodate an increased gross weight, the 175 is similar in appearance to the 172 of the same vintage. The main design change was the introduction of a stepped firewall in the 175, allowing the use of a longer cowl with larger air intakes, increasing airflow for improved engine cooling. The firewall was mounted further back in the fuselage than in the 172, and Cessna in turn relocated the instrument panel rearward into a wider section of the fuselage, allowing it to be enlarged and laid out differently than the 172 instrument panel. With the 1960 introduction of the 175A, Cessna introduced a swept-back vertical fin shared with the 172, along with a distinct engine cowling hump that serves as the most distinct external 175 spotting feature. Cessna also fitted the 175's stepped firewall and enlarged, relocated instrument panel to the 172 starting with the 172B model.

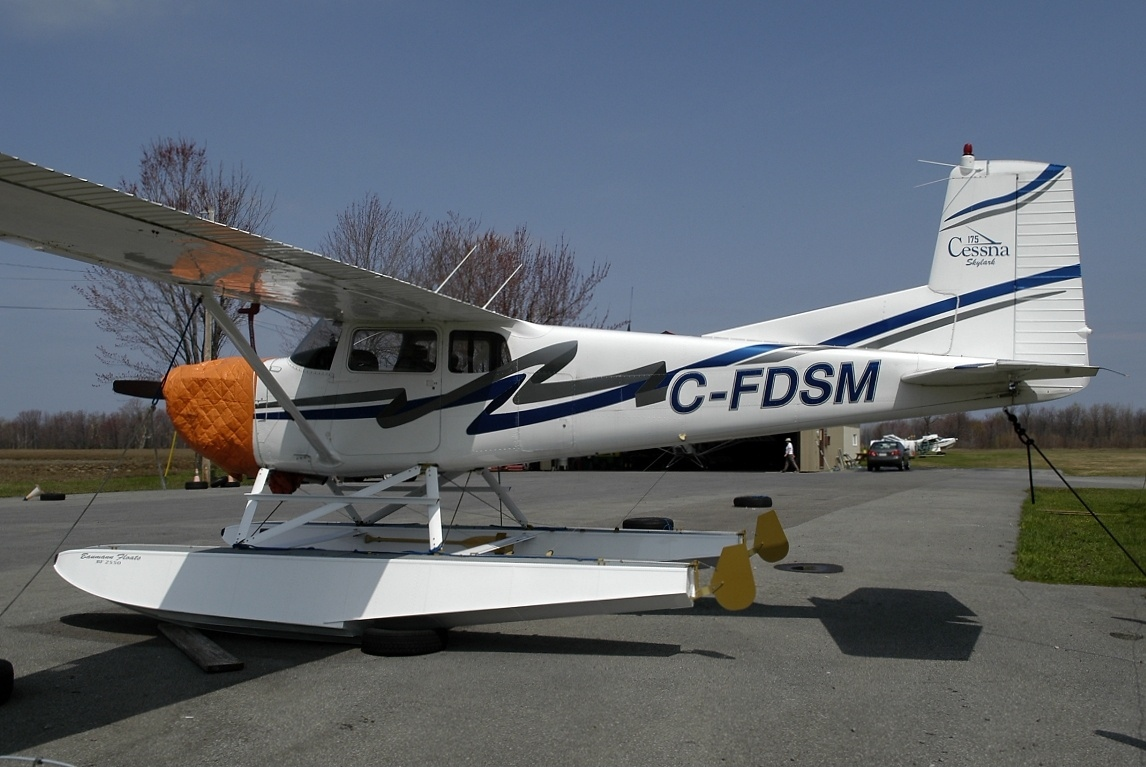
Cessna 175 floatplane

The other significant internal change from the 172 is a structural redesign of the inner third of the wings, allowing the installation of larger fuel tanks that hold 52 US gallons (200 L; 43 imp gal) versus 42 US gallons (160 L; 35 imp gal) in the 172; however, due to the location of the fuel pickups, only 42 gallons is usable in all flight conditions, and Cessna advised that only 167 hp (125 kW) may be available at the 175's best angle of climb.

Although externally near-identical to the 172 with most parts aft of the firewall being interchangeable, the 175 was built to a different type certificate. The P172D and R172 series (including the T-41B/C/D Mescalero) share the 175 type certificate, along with the 172RG, the retractable landing gear version of the 172.

=== The GO-300 engine ===
An unusual feature of the 175 is the geared GO-300 engine. Whereas most single-engine airplanes use direct drive, this engine drives the propeller through a reduction drive, so the engine runs at 3200 RPM to turn the propeller at 2400 RPM (4:3). The GO-300 engine suffered reliability problems and helped give the 175 a poor reputation. Some Skylarks flying today have been converted to larger-displacement direct-drive engines though almost 90% still retain the GO-300.

Modern authorities consider the GO-300's tainted reputation to be undeserved because pilots unfamiliar with reduction-drive engines often did not realize that the GO-300 must always be operated at relatively high RPM as specified in the Pilot's Operating Handbook (POH). Rather than cruising at 2900 RPM or higher as specified in the POH, pilots would cruise at lower RPM settings (2300–2700) appropriate for direct-drive engines in other light aircraft, which caused harmonic vibration in the reduction gear between the quill shaft (that turned the propeller) and crankshaft, and resulted in low airspeed that prevented the engine's cooling system from operating effectively. At 2500 RPM and below, the GO-300 does not generate sufficient oil pressure for adequate lubrication and cooling. These factors cause chronic reliability problems in 175s that are persistently operated at low RPM. Contradictory provisions in the original POH may have contributed to the problems, as it lists cruise speed and fuel burn down to 2400 RPM or 36% power, creating the misleading impression that sustained cruise at this RPM setting is advisable. Authorities also advise pilots of the 175 to descend gradually at constant power settings and to always keep a load on the engine, as the reduction drive makes it possible for airflow through the propeller to drive the engine during descent, which can result in engine damage.

== Variants ==
Cessna has historically used model years similar to U.S. auto manufacturers, with sales of new models typically starting a few months prior to the actual calendar year.

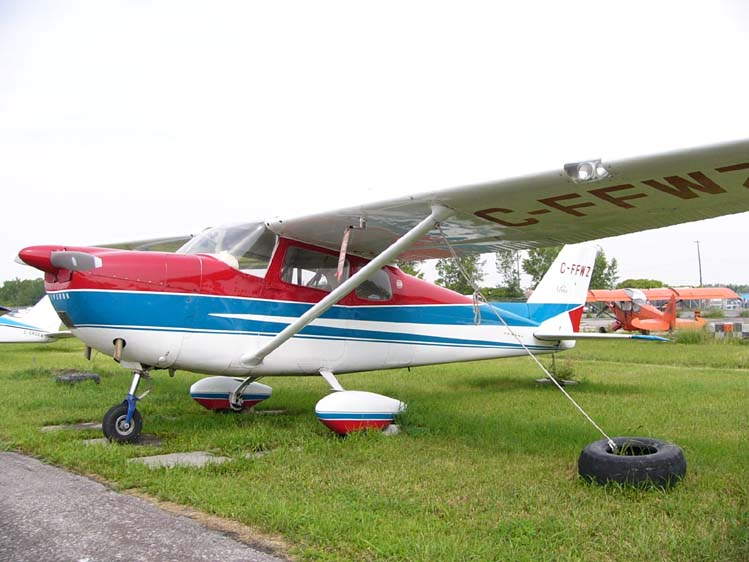
Cessna 175A Skylark at Rockcliffe Airport, Ontario, 2004

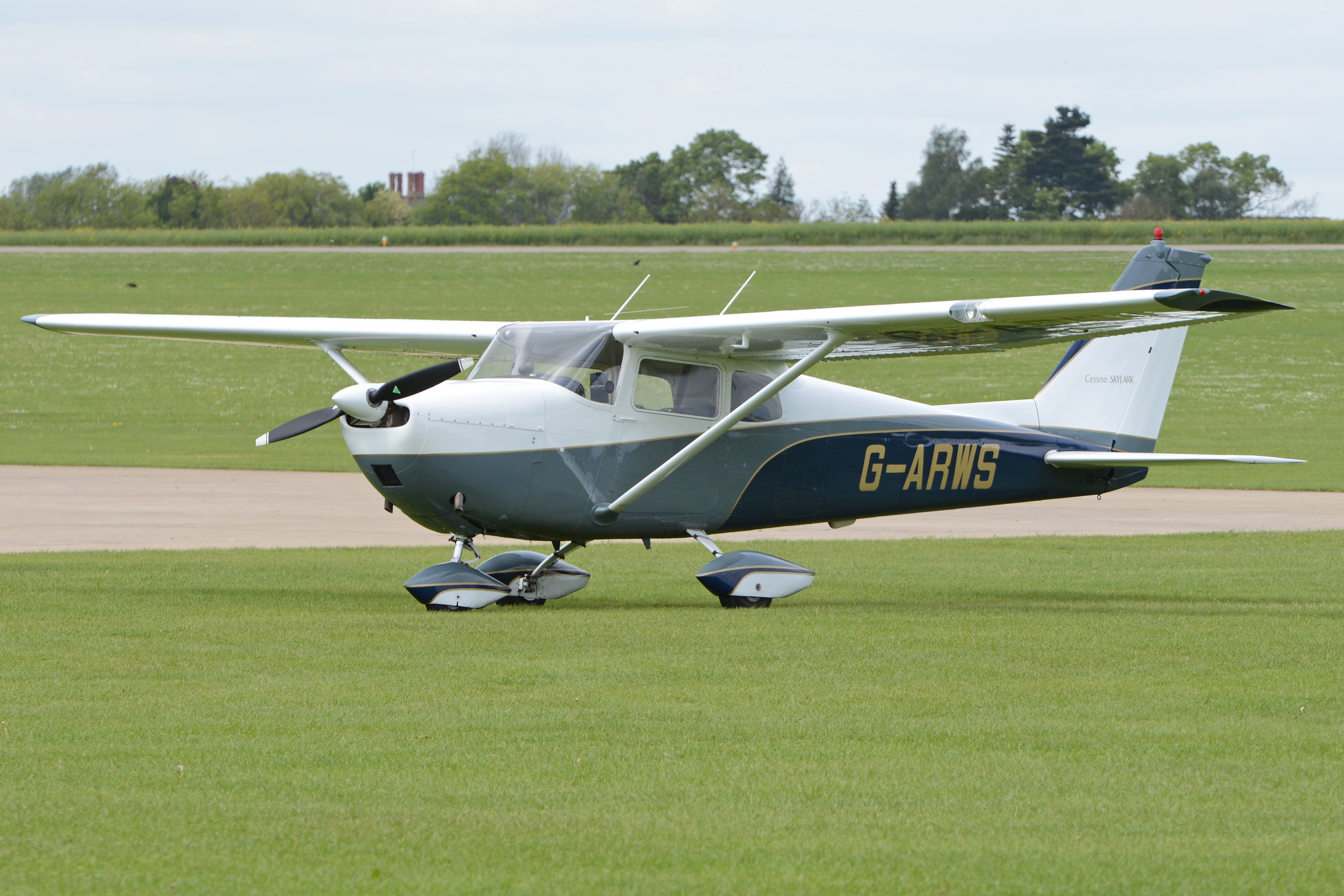
Cessna 175C at Sywell Aerodrome, Northamptonshire, UK. 2017

175
Introduced for the 1958 model year with a geared 175 hp (130 kW) Continental GO-300-A or -300-C engine with a shock-mounted cowling. Other differences from the 172 include a one-piece "Sight-Sweep" windshield and a gross weight of 2,350 lb (1,066 kg). Standard equipment included adjustable front seats, electric gauges, panel-mounted fuel drain control, safety-designed control wheels, and stainless steel mufflers. Optional wheel fairings were also available. The 1959 model year introduced new control wheels and was available in seven paint schemes (up from four in 1958), but was otherwise identical to the previous model year. Certified 14 January 1958. 702 (1958) and 536 (1959) built.
175A
1960 model year with a redesigned swept tail, a 175 hp (130 kW) Continental GO-300-A, -300-C, or -300-D engine, an external baggage door, and reduced nose gear oleo strut travel. This model was approved for seaplane operations with a gross weight of 2,450 lb (1,111 kg). A deluxe model was introduced under the name Skylark with a higher empty weight, full exterior paint, a refined interior, and wheel fairings as standard. Certified 28 August 1959. 540 built.
175B
1961 model year with an electric starter, a "Blend-Temp" ventilation system, "Polycloud" seat lining, and optional reclining front seats. The deluxe Skylark also featured an engine-driven vacuum system for the gyroscopic flight instruments. Like the 175A, the 175B was approved for seaplane operations. Certified 14 June 1960. 225 built.
175C Skylark
1962 model year with a 175 hp (130 kW) Continental GO-300-A or -300-E engine, new wingtip fairings with position lights, a revised cowling with cowl flaps, a dual-beam landing/taxi light on the left wing, a new two-bladed constant-speed propeller, and gross weight increased to 2,450 lb (1,111 kg). The baseline model was dropped for this model year, therefore all 175Cs carried the "Skylark" name. Certified 18 September 1961. 117 built. This was the last production model to carry the model number 175, though future variants of the same type certificate were marketed as variants of the Cessna 172.
175D
One flying prototype and one static test article. Put into production as the Model P172D.

== Specifications (Cessna 175C) ==
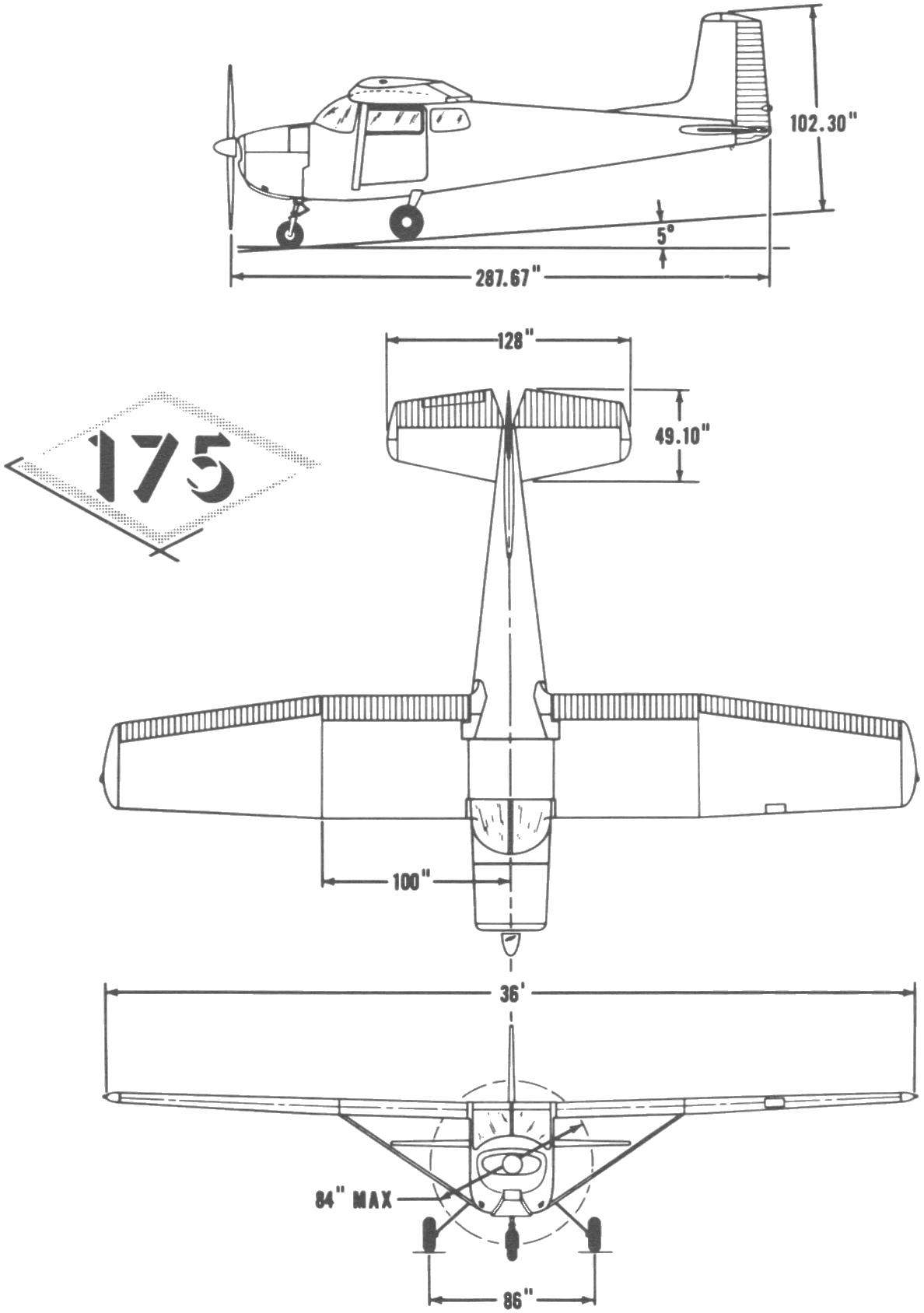
3-view line drawing of the Cessna 175

Data from Jane's All the World's Aircraft 1962–63

General characteristics

- Crew: 1
- Capacity: 3 passengers
- Length: 26 ft 6 in (8.08 m)
- Wingspan: 36 ft 2 in (11.02 m)
- Height: 8 ft 11 in (2.72 m)
- Wing area: 175 sq ft (16.3 m^{2})
- Aspect ratio: 7.52:1
- Airfoil: NACA 2412
- Empty weight: 1,410 lb (640 kg)
- Max takeoff weight: 2,450 lb (1,111 kg)
- Fuel capacity: 52 US gal (43 imp gal; 200 L)
- Powerplant: 1 × Continental GO-300-E air-cooled flat-six engine, 175 hp (130 kW)

Performance

- Maximum speed: 150 mph (240 km/h, 130 kn) at sea level
- Cruise speed: 104 mph (167 km/h, 90 kn) (economy cruise)
- Stall speed: 55 mph (89 km/h, 48 kn) (flaps extended)
- Range: 720 mi (1,160 km, 630 nmi) at economy cruise, no reserves
- Service ceiling: 17,800 ft (5,400 m)
- Rate of climb: 950 ft/min (4.8 m/s)
- Take-off run to 50 ft (15 m): 1,205 ft (367 m)
- Landing distance from 50 ft (15 m): 1,200 ft (370 m)

== Accidents and incidents ==
On September 23, 2025, a Cessna 175 Skylark, registered as PT-BAN, crashed in rural area of the Brazilian Pantanal-located municipality of Aquidauana, Mato Grosso do Sul, killing four people, including Chinese architect and developer of the "sponge city" concept Kongjian Yu.

== See also ==
- Skylark (disambiguation)

Related development

- Cessna 172
- Cessna R172
- Cessna 182 Skylane
