= 2025 Aquidauana Cessna 175 crash =

2025 aviation accident in Brazil

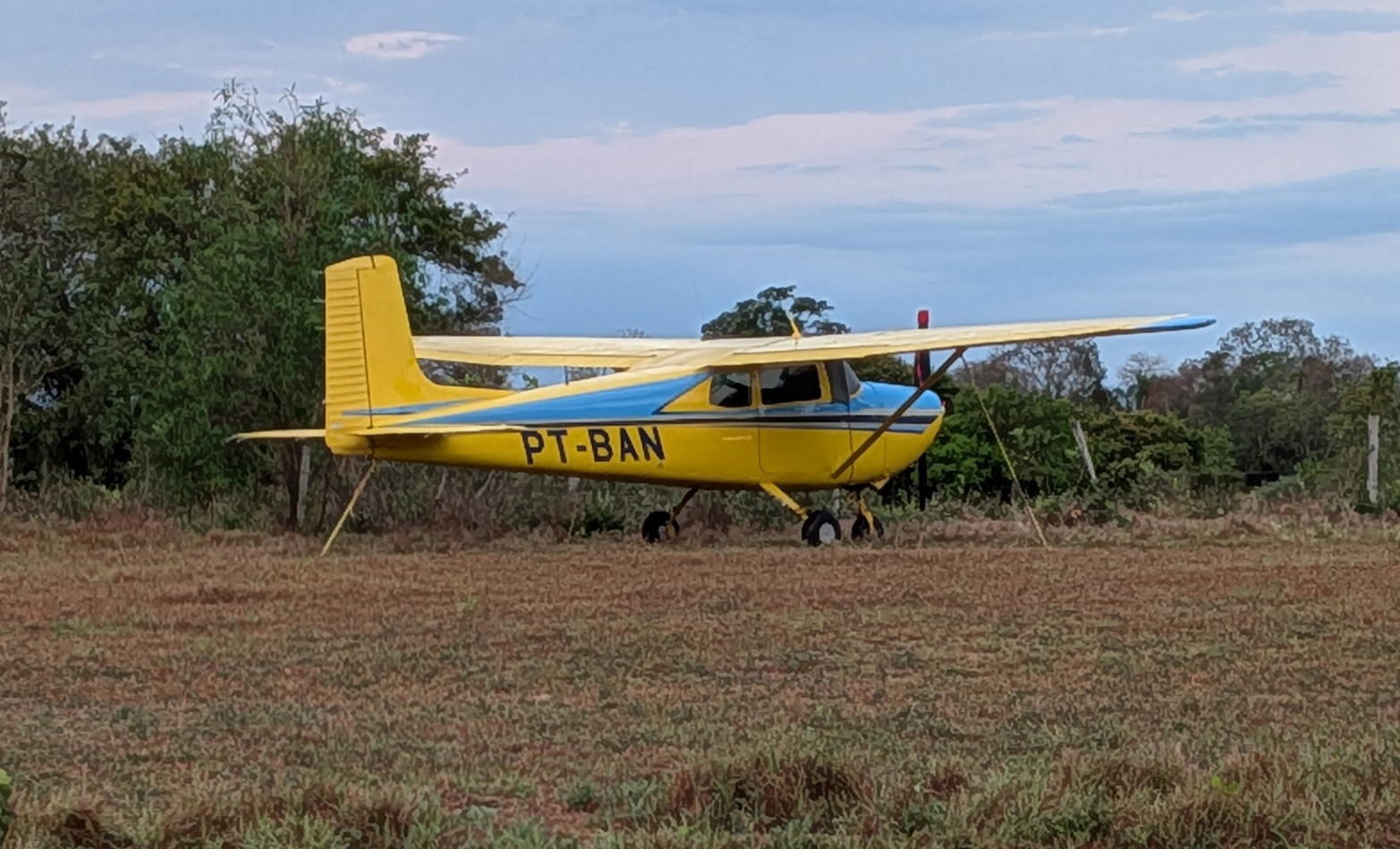
- The aircraft on 22 September 2025, one day before the accident.

Accident
- Date: 23 September 2025
- Summary: Possible unsuccessful landing attempt after a go-around at a non-permitted time during a visual flight
- Site: Barra Mansa farm, Aquidauana, Mato Grosso do Sul, Brazil

Aircraft
- Aircraft type: Cessna 175 Skylark
- Registration: PT-BAN
- Occupants: 4
- Passengers: 3
- Crew: 1
- Fatalities: 4
- Survivors: 0

On 23 September 2025, a small plane crashed in the rural area of the Brazilian Pantanal-located municipality of Aquidauana, Mato Grosso do Sul. All four occupants, including Chinese landscape architect and urban planner Kongjian Yu, were killed.

== Background ==
The plane's passengers were in the region to film a documentary about a project that would address issues surrounding climate changes based on the idea of "sponge city", an urban planning model in China that emphasizes the use of infrastructures capable of absorbing rainwater in order to mitigate flood risks and improve the urban climate. The concept was developed by Kongjian Yu, a Chinese architect among the people on board. Yu founded the College of Architecture and Landscape at Peking University. He was in the country also for the 14th International Architecture Biennale of São Paulo, in the same month.

Two people from the team were going to board the flight, but they were unable to do so due to the plane's maximum capacity of four people.

=== Aircraft ===
According to the reports, the aircraft, a Cessna 175 Skylark, registered as PT-BAN, belonged to the family of the pilot, Marcelo Barros, who used it on internal flights as a guide to places such as the Barra Mansa farm.

Official documents showed that the plane was authorized to operate only private air services, and was denied a license to execute air taxi activities.

== Investigation ==
According to preliminary information, the plane made three flights on the day of the crash, and tried to land after the permitted time for the runway, which operated only visually. On the second landing attempt, after a go-around, the aircraft lost altitude and crashed, causing an explosion. A witness said he heard the explosion at exactly 6 p.m. local time and then saw the smoke.

Despite the initial allegations, the police ruled out the possibility of white-lipped peccaries (pig-like ungulates found in Central and South America) on the runway.

== Victims ==
Nationality	Deaths
Brazil	3
China	1

The four occupants on the flight were:

- Kongjian Yu, 62, Chinese landscape architect and urban planner;
- Luiz Fernando Feres da Cunha Ferraz, Brazilian documentary filmmaker;
- Rubens Crispim Jr., Brazilian director and documentary filmmaker;
- Marcelo Pereira de Barros, plane's pilot and owner.

All the bodies were found burned beyond recognition.

== Reactions ==
Following Yu's death in the crash, Brazilian President Luiz Inácio Lula da Silva wrote on his social media: "In times of climate change, Yu became a global reference with his sponge cities, which unite quality of life and environmental protection". In a post on X, Brazilian Vice President Geraldo Alckmin stated that Yu was known for his "notable contributions to sustainable urbanism, the preservation of biodiversity, and the protection of the planet," adding that his legacy will continue to inspire those dedicated to ecological cause.

== See also ==
- List of fatalities from aviation accidents
