= Cessna T-41 Mescalero =

US built military training aircraft series developed from Cessna 172

T-41 Mescalero
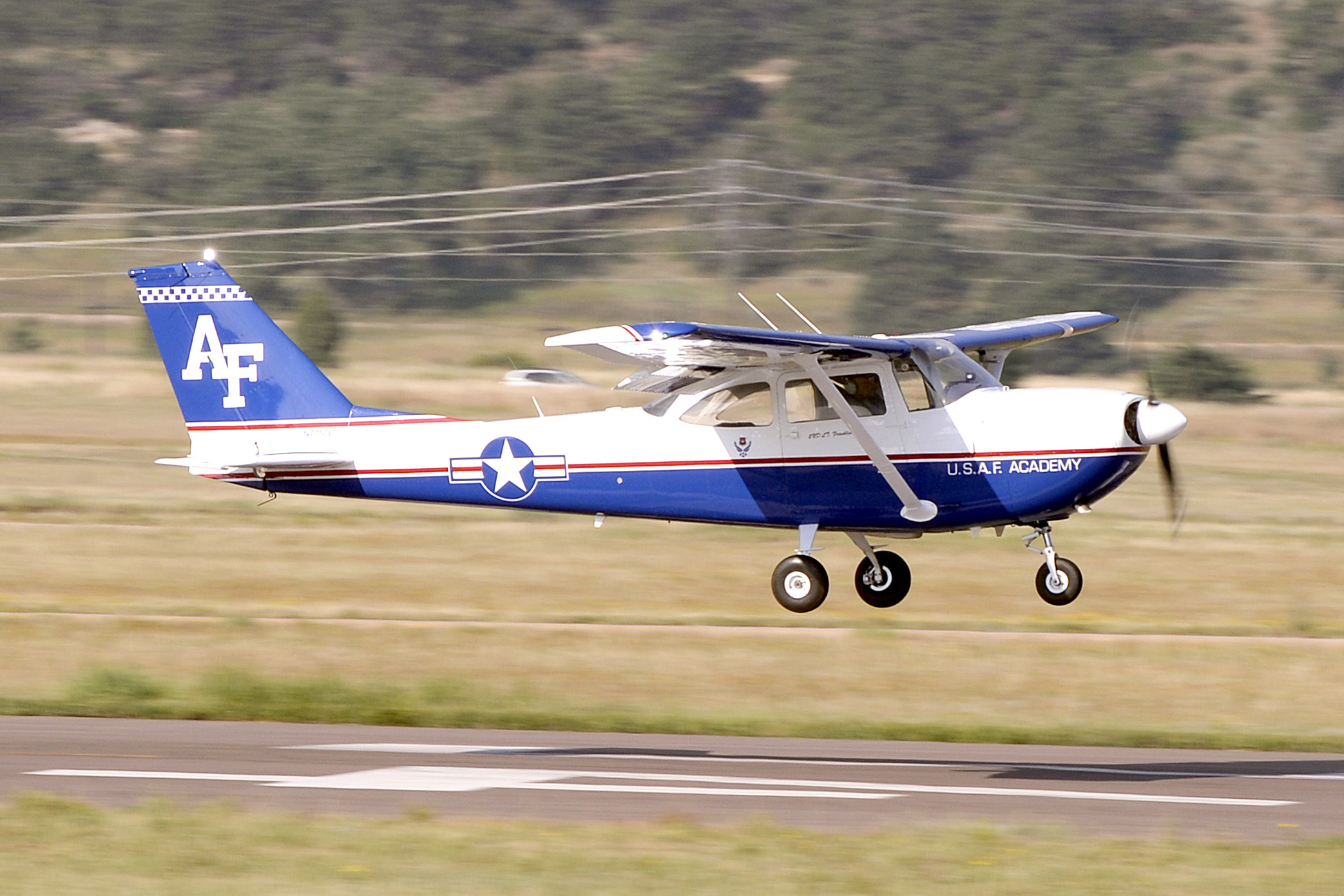
- Cessna T-41D of the 557th Flying Training Squadron

General information
- Type: Primary pilot trainer
- National origin: United States
- Manufacturer: Cessna
- Status: In service
- Primary users: United States Air Force United States Army; Indonesian Air Force; Turkish Air Force
- Number built: T-41A : 230; T-41B : 255; T-41C : 52; T-41D : 299

History
- Manufactured: 1964–1996
- Introduction date: 1964
- Developed from: Cessna 172; Cessna R172

The Cessna T-41 Mescalero is a military version of the popular Cessna 172, operated by the United States Air Force (USAF) and Army, as well as the armed forces of various other countries as a pilot-training aircraft. The T-41A, used by the USAF for introductory training of pilot candidates with little or no flying experience, was a commercial, off-the-shelf 172 with few modifications. Upgraded versions of the T-41 with more powerful engines and more specialized equipment were based on the Cessna R172 derivative of the 172, including the T-41B for the Army, T-41C for the USAF Academy, and the T-41D for the U.S. Military Aid Program. The reciprocating, single-engined T-41 entered service in the 1960s and was mostly withdrawn by the USAF by 1995, but some remain in limited military service today, and some military surplus examples are flown by civilian owners.

== Design and development ==
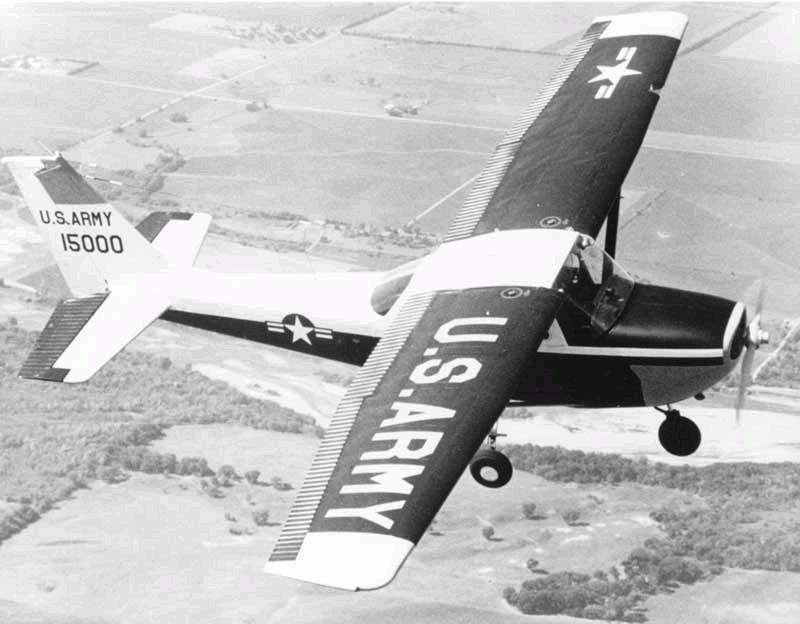
The first production Cessna R172E operating as a T-41B Mescalero with the US Army

In 1964, the USAF decided to use the commercial, off-the-shelf Cessna 172F as a lead-in aircraft for student pilots rather than starting them out in the T-37 jet aircraft. The USAF ordered 237 T-41As from Cessna. (Note: The T-41A designation was originally assigned in 1962 to a proposed United States Navy navigation trainer variant of the Grumman Gulfstream I, but the purchase was deferred and the designation was reassigned; the Grumman was subsequently ordered in 1966 and entered service as the TC-4C Academe.) The first USAF class (67-A) of students began training on the T-41 from the civilian airport in Big Spring, Texas, in August 1965.

The T-41B was the US Army version, with a 210 hp (160 kW) Continental IO-360 engine and constant-speed propeller in place of the 145 hp (108 kW) Continental O-300 and 7654 fixed-pitch propeller used in the 172 and T-41A.

In 1968, the USAF acquired 52 of the more powerful T-41Cs, which used 210 hp (160 kW) Continental IO-360 and a fixed-pitch climb propeller, for use at the United States Air Force Academy (USAFA).

In 1996, the aircraft were further upgraded to the T-41D, which included an upgrade in avionics and to a constant-speed propeller.

Beginning in 1993, the USAF replaced many of the T-41 fleet with the Slingsby T-3A Firefly for the flight-screening role and for aerobatic training, which was outside the design capabilities of the T-41.

Four T-41s remained at the Air Force Academy for the USAFA Flying Team, as well as to support certain academic classes.

A number of air forces, including Saudi Arabia and Singapore, purchased various civilian models of the Cessna 172 for use in military training, transport, and liaison roles. While similar to the T-41 and named as such, these aircraft were not actually T-41s from a technical standpoint and were powered by the standard 172 powerplants available in the model year purchased, including the Continental O-300 in pre-1968 aircraft and the Lycoming O-320 in later 172s.

== Variants ==
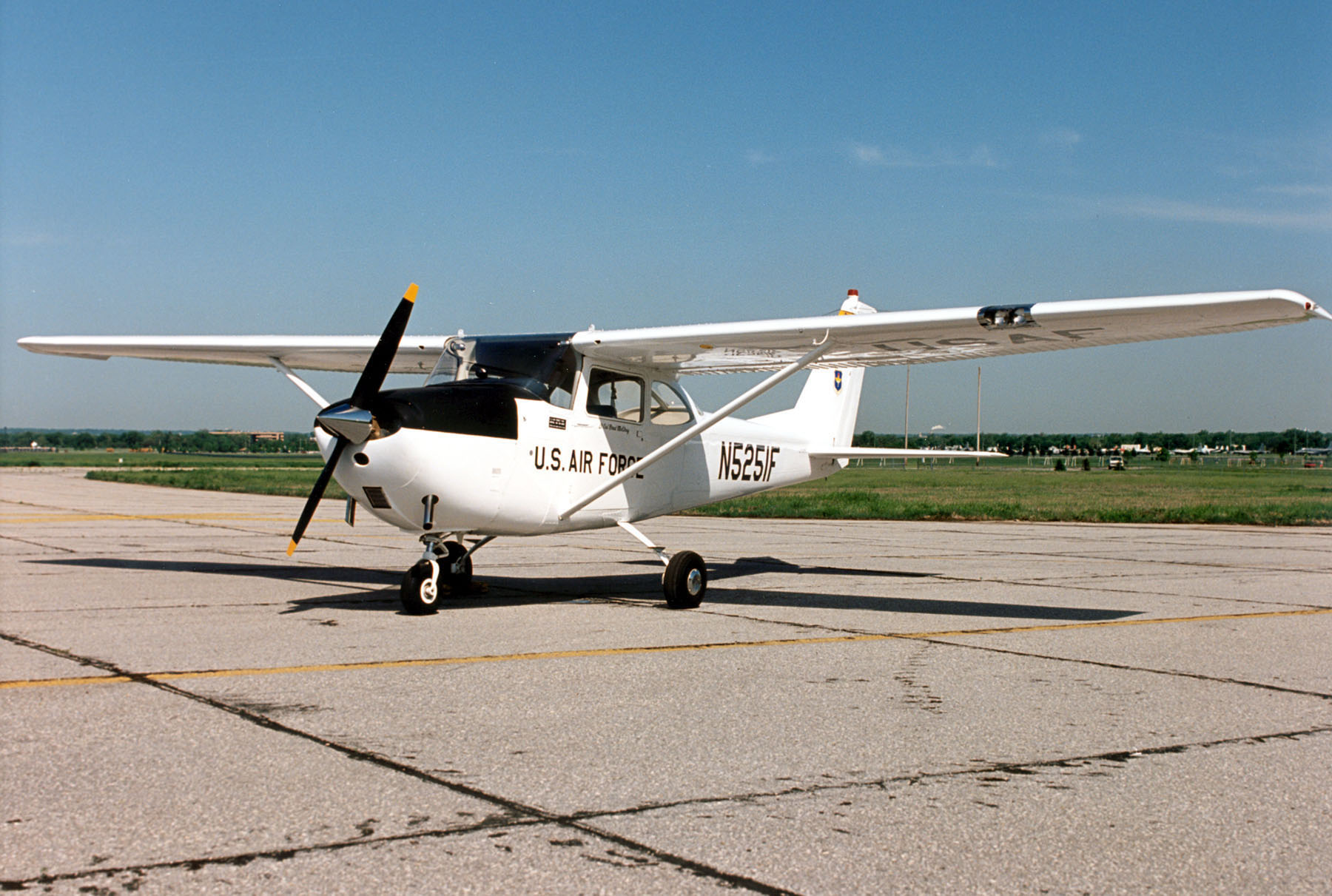
USAF T-41A

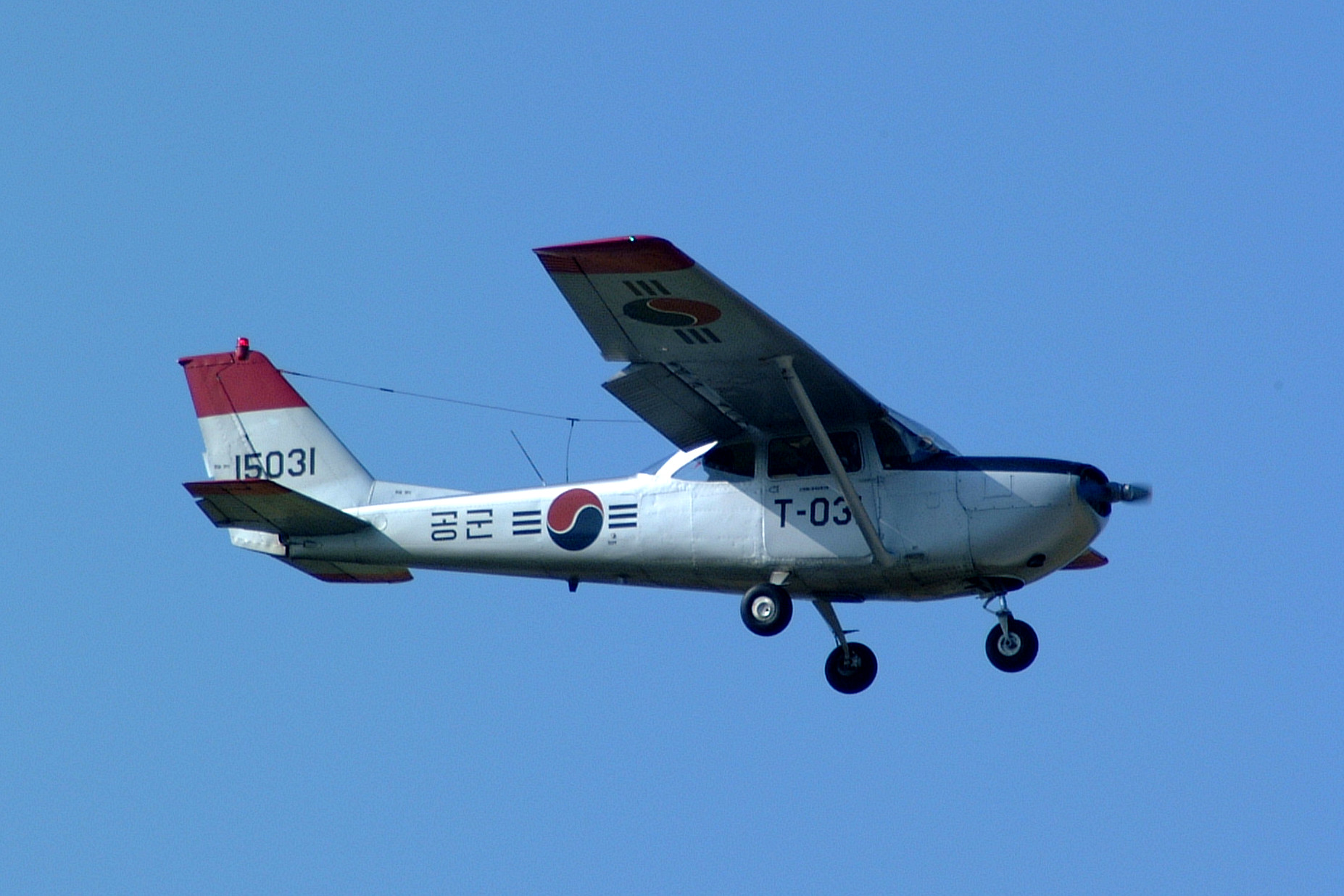
Cessna T-41B of the Republic of Korea

Variants of the T-41 other than the T-41A were built under the type certificate of the Cessna 175 Skylark. The 175 was a close derivative of the 172 and most parts aft of the firewall are interchangeable. The controversial Continental GO-300 engine from the civilian 175 was never used in the T-41; the T-41B through Ds instead used the Continental IO-360. Cessna never offered a civilian model directly analogous to these aircraft, but Cessna licensee Reims Aviation in France sold similar IO-360-powered models as the R172 Rocket and Hawk XP.

T-41A
United States Air Force version of the Cessna 172F, 172G, and 172H for undergraduate pilot training, powered by 145 hp Continental O-300. 230 built; 170 (172F), 26 (172G), and 34 (172H).
T-41B
United States Army version powered by a fuel-injected 210 hp (157 kW) Continental IO-360-D or -DE driving a constant-speed propeller and featuring a 28V electrical system, jettisonable doors, an openable right front window, a 6.00x6 nose wheel tire, and military avionics. The baggage door was removed; 255 built (all Model R172E).
T-41C
USAF Academy version with a 14V electrical system, fixed-pitch propeller, civilian avionics, and only the two front seats; 52 total built, 45 as the R172E and seven as the R172G.
T-41D
Military Aid Program version with 28V electrical system, four seats, corrosion-proofing, reinforced flaps and ailerons, a baggage door, and provisions for wing-mounted pylons; 299 total were built, 34 as the R172E, 74 as the R172F, 28 as the R172G, and 163 as the R172H (with extended tail fillet). First T-41D delivered to the Philippine Air Force in 1968
B.F.14
(Thai: บ.ฝ.๑๔) Royal Thai Armed Forces designation for the T-41D.

== Operators ==
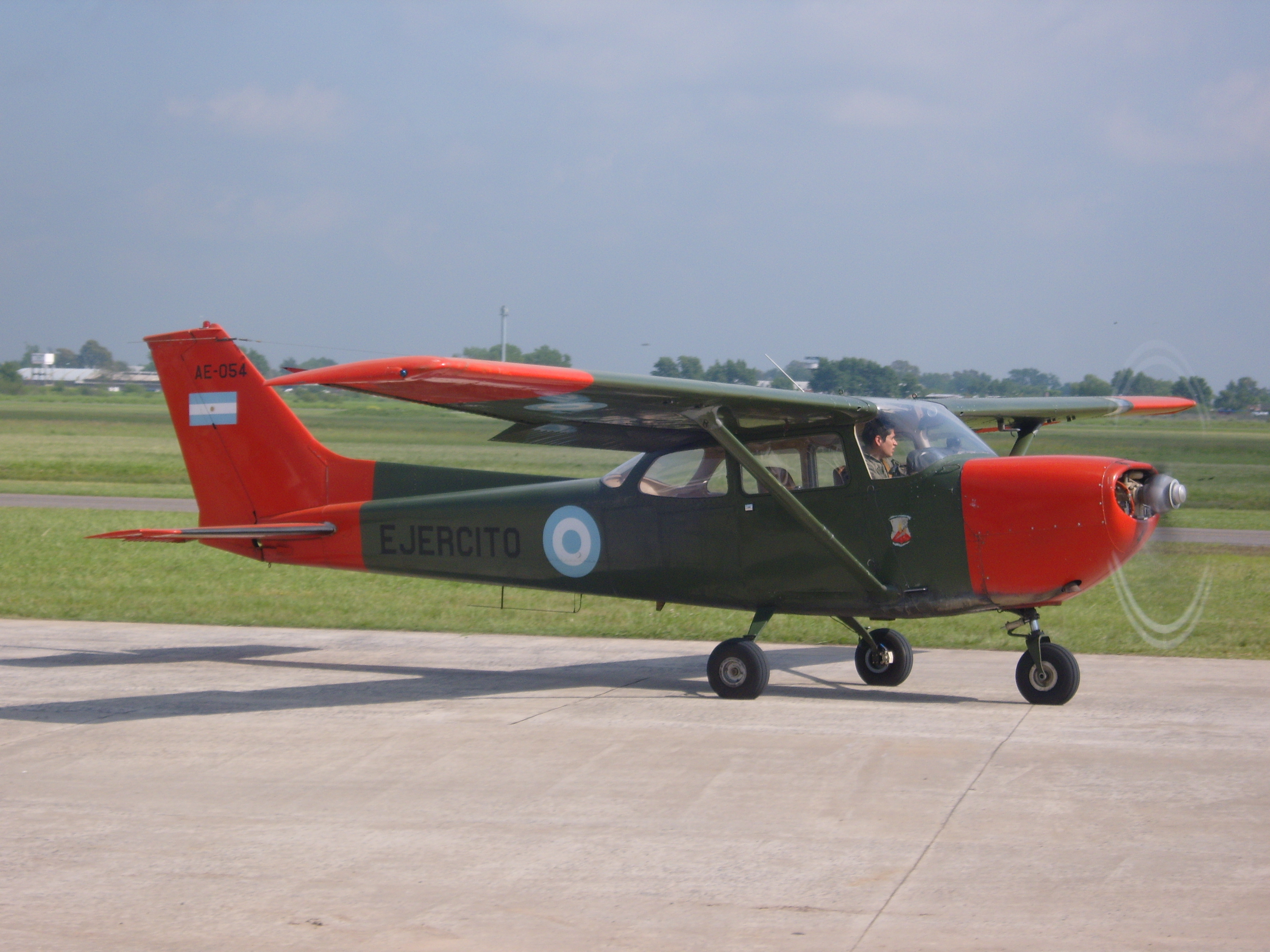
Argentine Army Cessna T-41D Mescalero

Argentina

- Argentine Army Aviation

Bolivia

- Bolivian Air Force

Colombia

- Colombian Air Force (30× T-41D) - retired

Dominican Republic

- Dominican Air Force (10× T-41D / R172)

Ecuador

- Ecuadorian Air Force (8× T-41A, 12× T-41D)

El Salvador

- Salvadoran Air Force

Greece

- Hellenic Air Force (T-41A, 21× T-41D, retired)

Honduras

- Honduran Air Force (3× T-41B and 6× T-41D, retired)

Indonesia

- Indonesian Air Force (T-41D)

Imperial State of Iran

- Imperial Iranian Air Force (T-41D)

Khmer Republic

- Khmer Air Force (22× T-41D)

Kingdom of Laos

- Royal Lao Air Force (T-41B, T-41D)

Liberia

- Armed Forces of Liberia (T-41D)

Pakistan

- Pakistani Air Force (T-41D)

Paraguay

- Paraguayan Air Force (5× T-41B, retired)

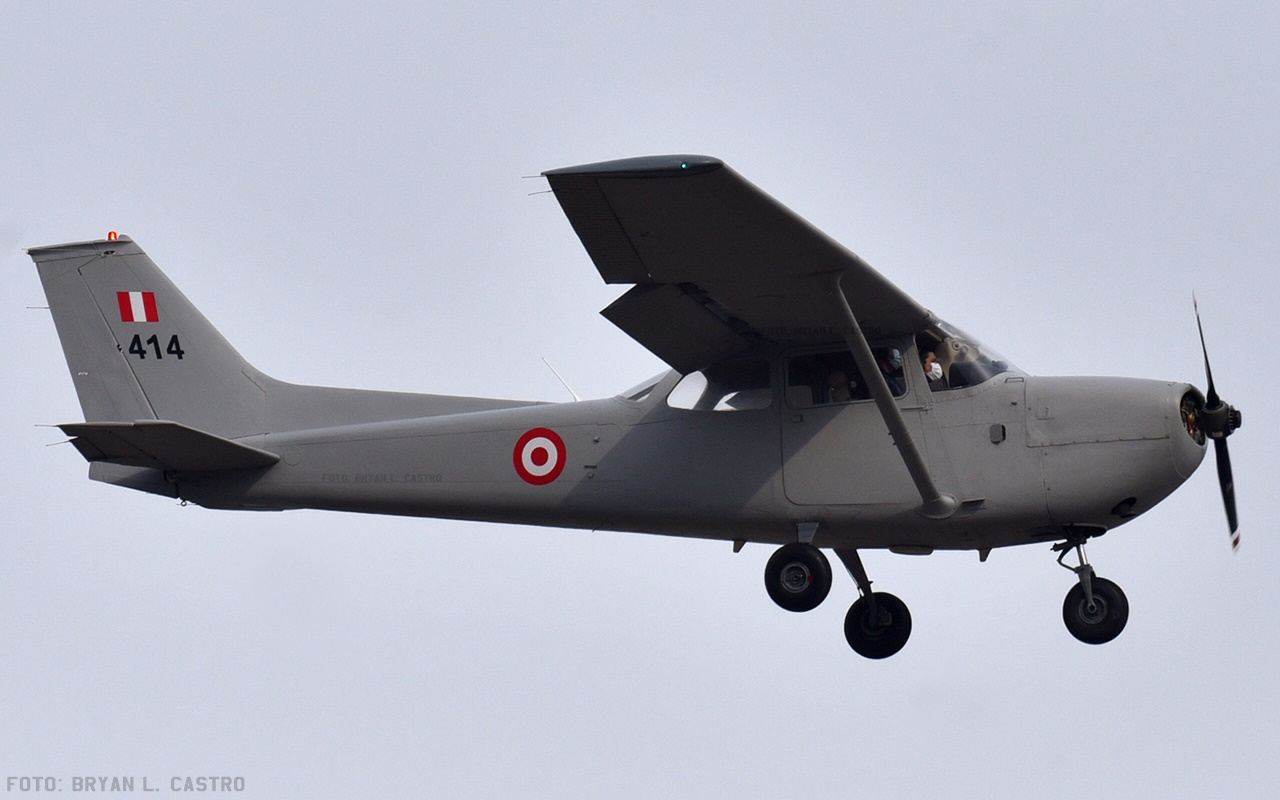
T-41DM of Peru

Peru

- Peruvian Air Force (25× T-41A)

Philippines

- Philippine Air Force (20× T-41D, acquired from South Korea in 2008)

Republic of Korea

- Republic of Korea Air Force (15× T-41D)

Turkey

- Turkish Air Force (30× T-41D)
- Turkish Land Forces (25× T-41D)

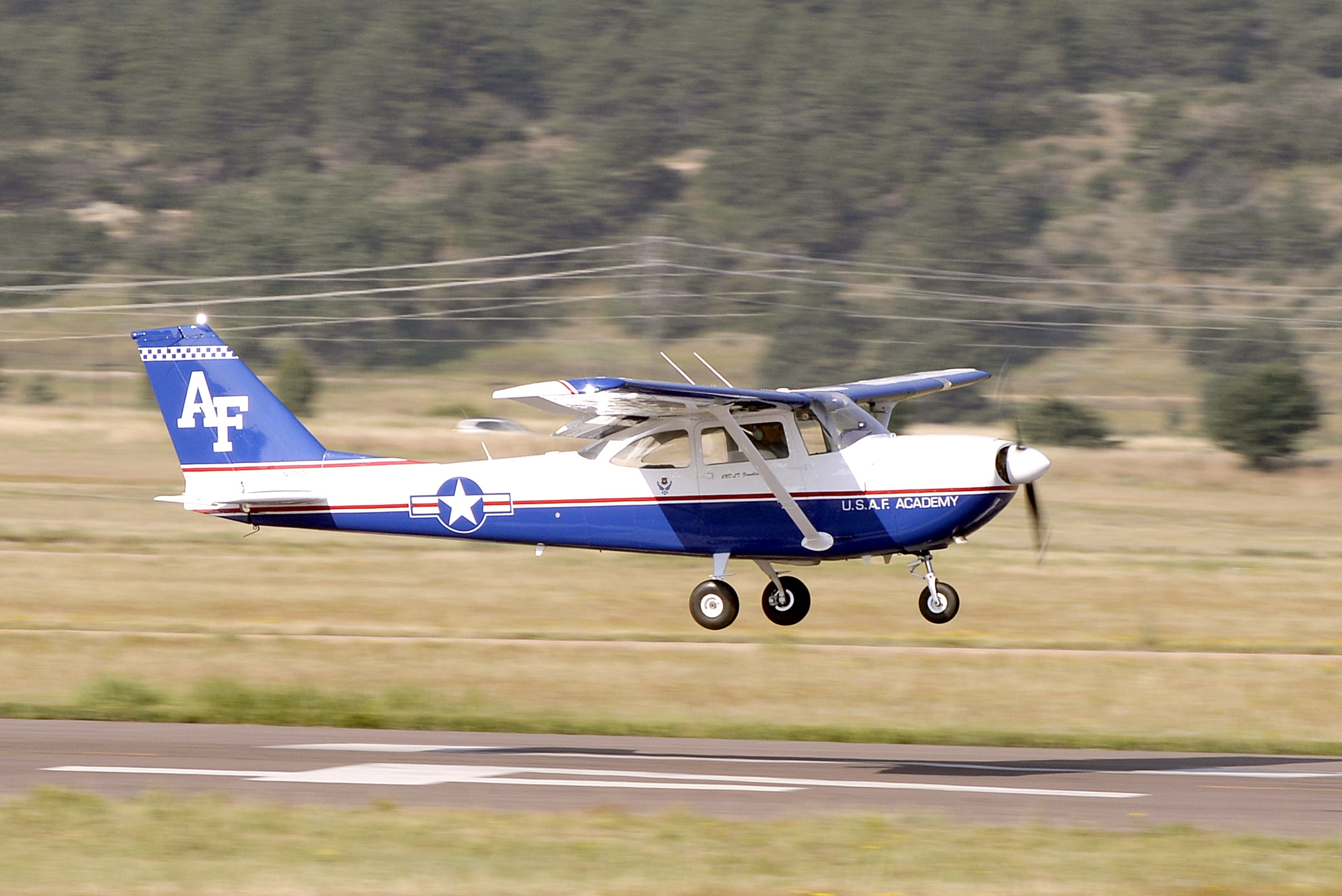
T-41D of the USAFA Flying Team

United States

- United States Army (255× T-41B)
- United States Air Force (211× T-41A and 52× T-41C)
- Jacksonville Navy Flying Club/NAS Jacksonville, Florida - 2 x T-41A, 1 x T-41B
- Kirtland AFB Aeroclub/Kirtland AFB, New Mexico - 5 x T-41C
- Patuxent River Navy Flying Club/NAS Patuxent River, Maryland - 3 x T-41C
- Eglin AFB Aeroclub/Eglin AFB, FL - 2 x T-41A, 1 x T-41B
- Travis AFB Aero Club/Travis AFB, CA - 1 x T-41A, 1 x T-41C
- Dover AFB Aero Club/Dover AFB, DE - 2 x T-41A, 1x T-41C

== Aircraft on display ==
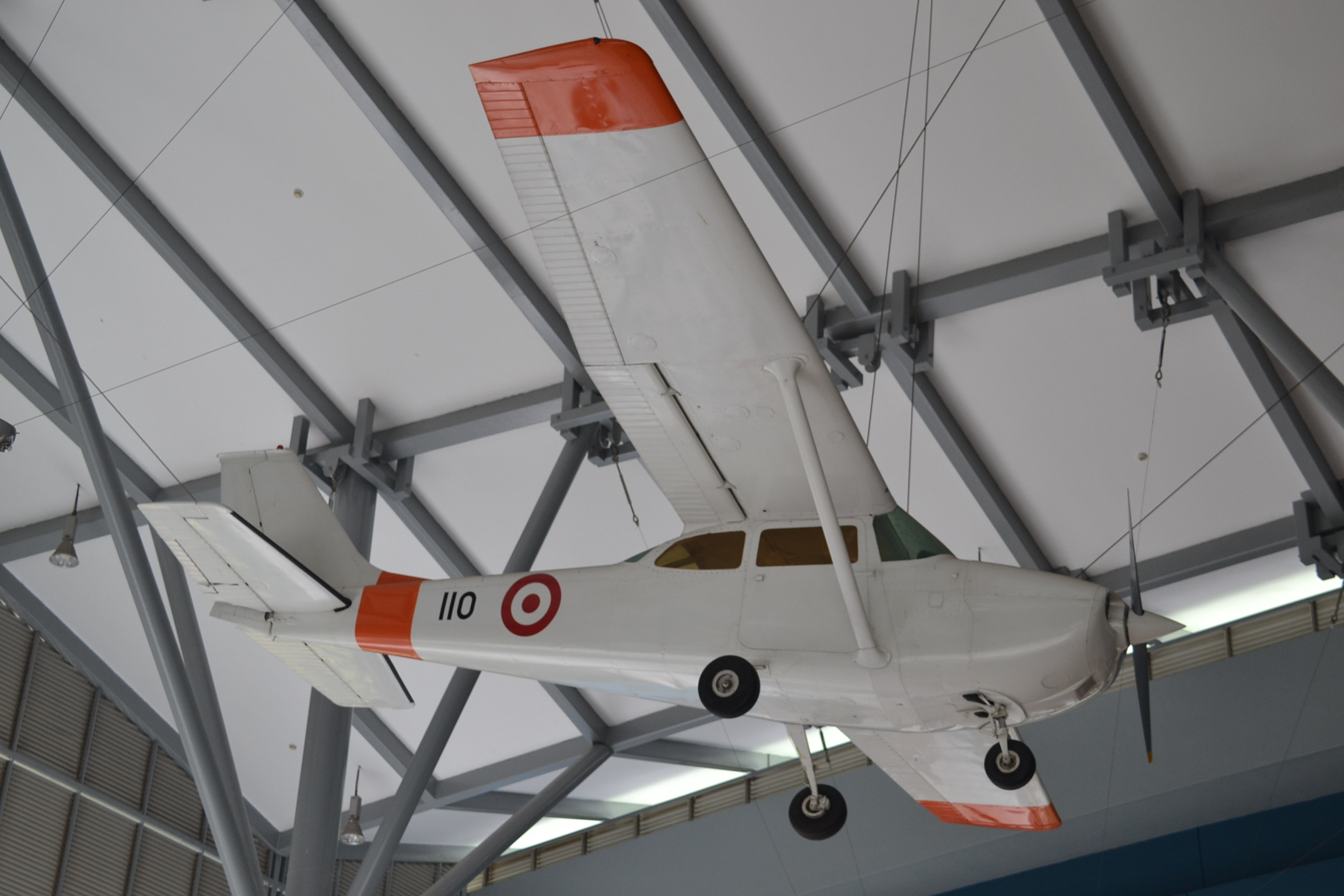
Singapore T-41 on display at museum

Singapore

- 110 - T-41A on static display at the Singapore Air Force Museum in Paya Lebar Air Base

South Korea

- 67-15056 - T-41B on static display at the War Memorial of Korea in Seoul, South Korea.

United States

- 65-5168 – T-41A on static display in the airpark at Vance Air Force Base in Enid, Oklahoma.
- 65-5251 – T-41A on static display at the National Museum of the United States Air Force in Dayton, Ohio. This aircraft was previously assigned to the United States Air Force Academy inventory.
- 67-14977 – T-41A on static display as part of the Officer Training School complex at Maxwell Air Force Base in Montgomery, Alabama.

== Specifications (T-41C) ==
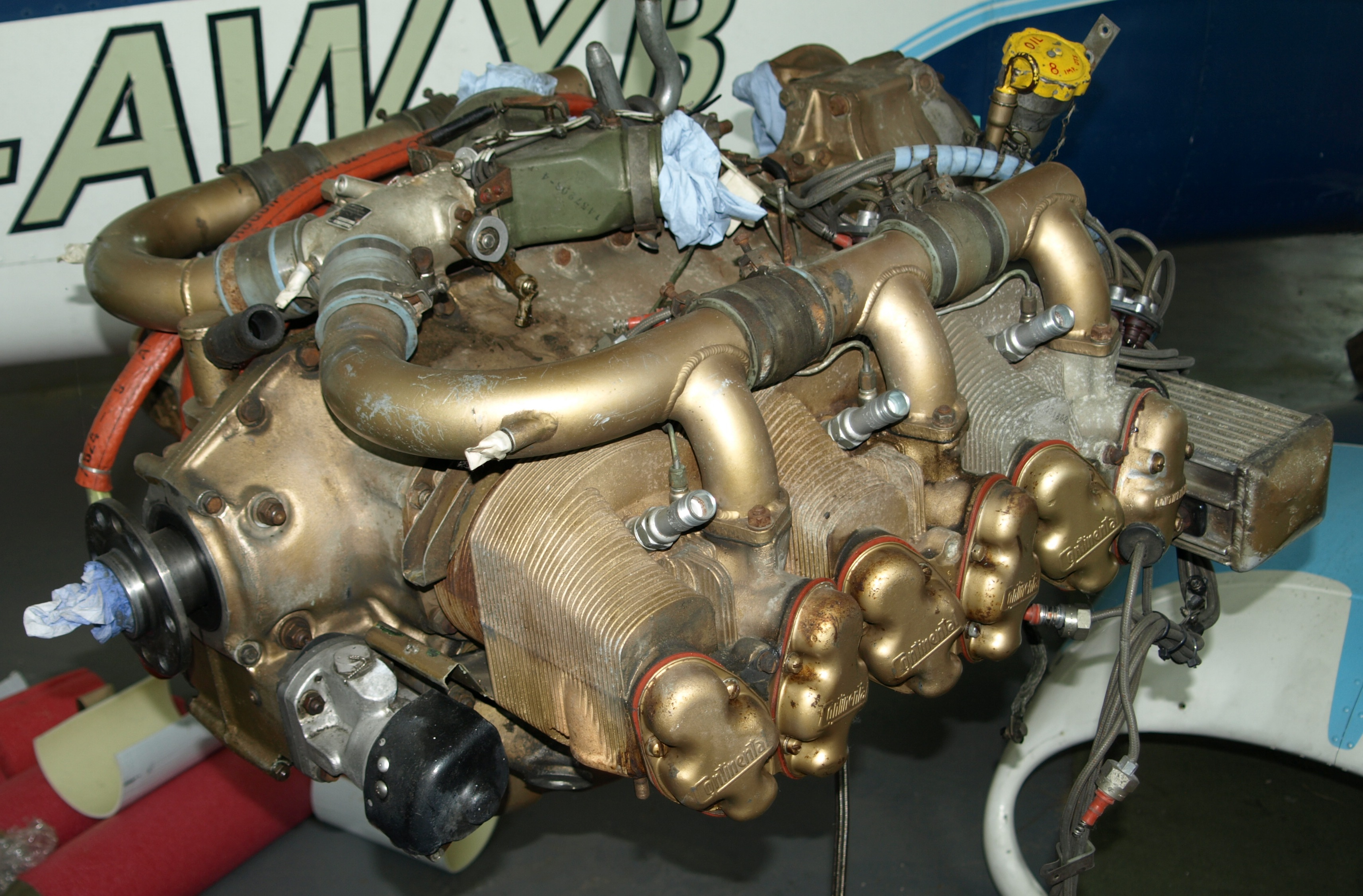
Continental IO-360-D six-cylinder engine

Data from Global Security

General characteristics

- Crew: one
- Capacity: three passengers
- Length: 26 ft 11 in (8.20 m)
- Wingspan: 35 ft 10 in (10.92 m)
- Height: 8 ft 10 in (2.69 m)
- Wing area: 159 sq ft (14.8 m^{2})
- Empty weight: 1,363 lb (618 kg)
- Gross weight: 2,500 lb (1,134 kg)
- Powerplant: 1 × Continental IO-360-D Six-cylinder air-cooled horizontally-opposed piston engine, 210 hp (160 kW)
- Propellers: 2-bladed variable-pitch propeller

Performance

- Maximum speed: 125 kn (144 mph, 232 km/h)
- Range: 626 nmi (720 mi, 1,159 km)
- Service ceiling: 17,000 ft (5,200 m)
- Rate of climb: 880 ft/min (4.5 m/s)

== See also ==
- Applebay GA-111 Mescalero (Glider with same nickname)

Related development

- Cessna 170
- Cessna 172
- Cessna R172

Aircraft of comparable role, configuration, and era

- CT-134 Musketeer
- Slingsby T-3 Firefly
- PAC CT/4
