= Cessna R172 =

Propeller driven single engine aircraft

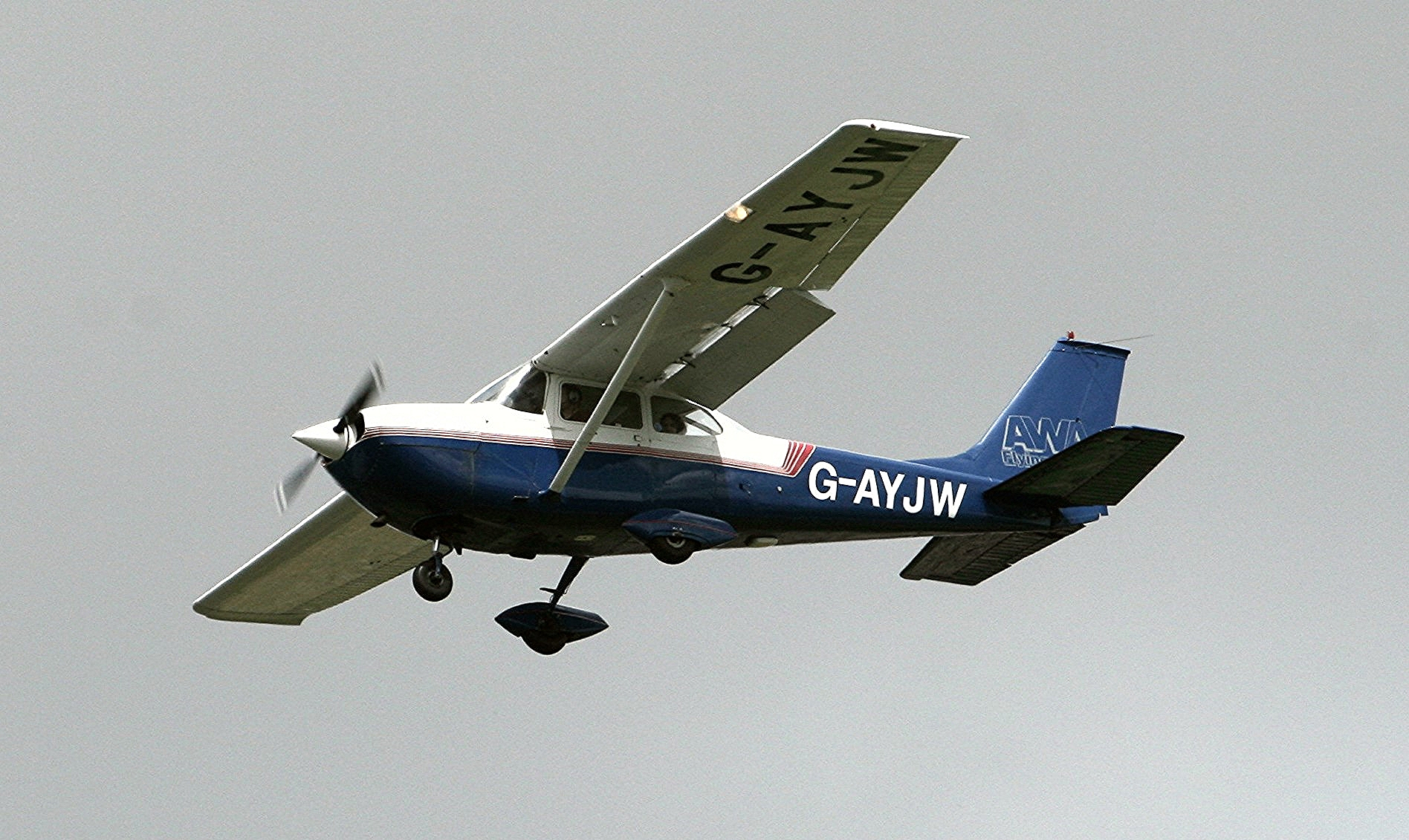
- French-built Reims FR172G

General information
- Type: Civil utility aircraft
- National origin: United States
- Manufacturer: Cessna; Reims Aviation
- Status: Discontinued
- Primary users: Chilean Army Irish Air Corps
- Number built: 4,012

History
- Manufactured: 1963–1985
- Introduction date: 1963
- Developed from: Cessna 175 Skylark
- Variant: Cessna T-41 Mescalero

The Cessna P172D and R172 are a series of light two to four-seat, single-engine, fixed wing aircraft produced by Cessna between 1963 and 1985. The series began as an attempt to rebrand the unpopular Cessna 175 Skylark as a variant of the more successful Cessna 172 under the P172D Powermatic name, but the rebranded aircraft sold poorly and was discontinued from the American civilian market after only a year. However, the R172 found success with military operators as the T-41 Mescalero, and was eventually reintroduced to the civilian market in 1977 as the Hawk XP. The aircraft was also produced in France by Reims Aviation for the European market as the Reims Rocket, including civilian versions of otherwise military-only variants. A version with retractable landing gear was also offered in the early 1980s as the Cessna 172RG Cutlass RG, but suffered from poor sales and was discontinued in 1985.

== Design and development ==
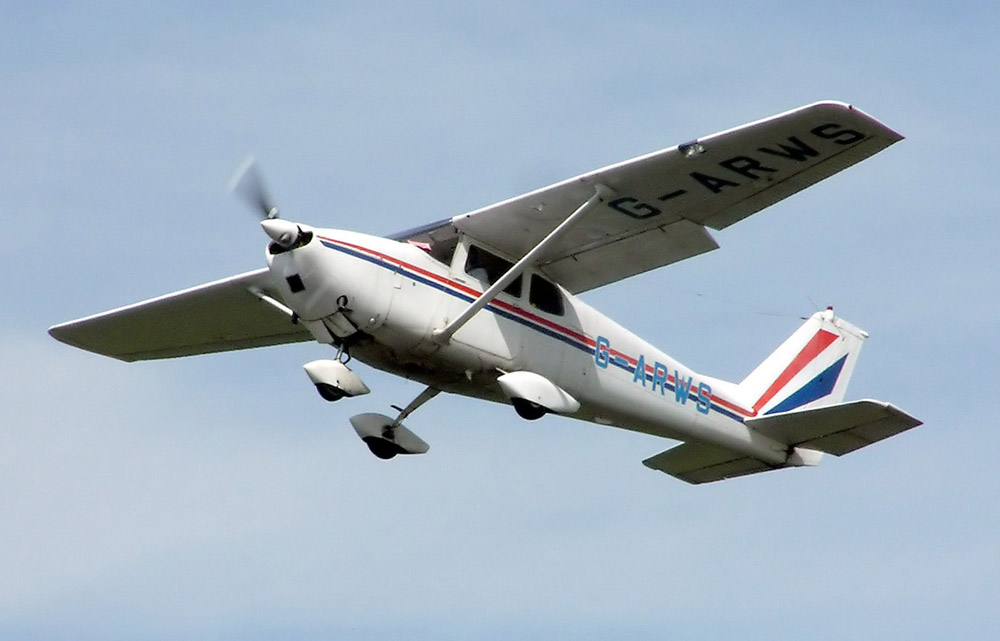
The R172 series shares a type certificate with the Cessna 175 Skylark rather than the original 172.

The R172 traces its roots to the Cessna 175 Skylark, which itself is a development of the Cessna 172 but powered by a geared Continental GO-300 engine. By 1962, the Cessna 175 had gained a reputation for poor engine reliability, though whether this was due to a problem with the engine or improper operation by inexperienced pilots remains a topic of debate. Although two prototypes for the 1963 Skylark were built as the 175D, Cessna decided to rebrand the aircraft as the "P172D Powermatic" to disassociate the new model year from the 175's poor reputation. However, the rebrand did little to help the P172D's sales, as its market placement between the standard 172 and the faster Cessna 182 made it unpopular with customers. The P172D was discontinued after the 1963 model year.

In mid-1963, the French aircraft manufacturer Reims Aviation, which had built four P172Ds under license as the FP172D, converted the fourth aircraft into a prototype for a military liaison aircraft. The aircraft's geared engine was replaced with a 210 hp (157 kW) Continental IO-360-D driving a constant-speed propeller. This experiment inspired Cessna to produce their own IO-360-powered military variant of the 175 type, which the company designated "R172E" and entered military service as the T-41B/D Mescalero. Various improvements were implemented during the T-41's production run, which culminated in the R172H with a dorsal fairing similar to the 172L. While Cessna focused on military variants, Reims built civilian models of the T-41D as the FR172 Reims Rocket.

Following the success of the Reims Rocket in Europe, Cessna decided to once again produce the 175 type for the civilian market. In 1974, a single R172J was built with a 210 hp (157 kW) Continental IO-360 engine. The R172K Hawk XP was introduced for the 1977 model year with a derated 195 hp (145 kW) version of the IO-360. However, owners claimed that the increased performance of the Hawk XP did not compensate for its increased purchase price and the higher operating costs associated with the larger engine. The aircraft was well accepted for use on floats, however, as the standard 172 is not a strong floatplane, even with only two people on board, while the Hawk XP's extra power improves water takeoff performance dramatically.

=== 172RG Cutlass RG ===
The final model to be certified under the Cessna 175 type certificate was the 172RG, which was certified on June 1, 1979. First flown on August 24, 1978, the 172RG was essentially a standard 172 fitted with the retractable landing gear of the Cessna R182 Skylane RG and powered by a 180 hp (130 kW) Lycoming O-360-F1A6 engine driving a constant-speed propeller. These changes gave it an optimal cruise speed of 140 knots (260 km/h), compared to 122 knots (226 km/h) for the contemporary 160 horsepower (120 kW) 172N or 172P. It also had more fuel capacity than a standard Skyhawk, 62 US gallons (230 L; 52 imp gal) versus 53 US gallons (200 L; 44 imp gal), giving it greater range and endurance.

The Cutlass RG sold for about US$19,000 more than the standard 172, making it the lowest-priced four-seat retractable-gear airplane on the U.S. market when it was introduced. However, when the Cutlass RG hit the market in 1980, general aviation was suffering from a decline. The 172RG filled a narrow niche in the market and faced competition from the Piper PA-28 Arrow, as well as Cessna's own 177RG Cardinal RG and the R182 Skylane RG. By the time production ceased in 1985, only 1,191 had been produced. Despite the concurrent decline in the general aviation market, the 172RG proved popular as an inexpensive flight-school trainer for complex aircraft.

The 172RG's combination of the basic 172 aircraft and the same landing gear as the R182 was touted as a benefit by Cessna employees, who often joked that it was "a new Cessna that already withstood the test of time." However, owners have found the landing gear to have higher maintenance requirements than comparable systems from other manufacturers, with several parts prone to rapid wear or cracking. Compared to a standard 172 or 182, the 172RG is easier to load with its center of gravity too far aft. Although it is slower and has less passenger and cargo capacity than popular competing single-engine retractable-gear aircraft such as the Beechcraft Bonanza, the Cutlass RG is praised by owners for its relatively low operating costs, robust and reliable engine, and docile flying qualities comparable to the standard 172, although it has higher landing gear maintenance and insurance costs than a fixed-gear 172.

== Variants ==
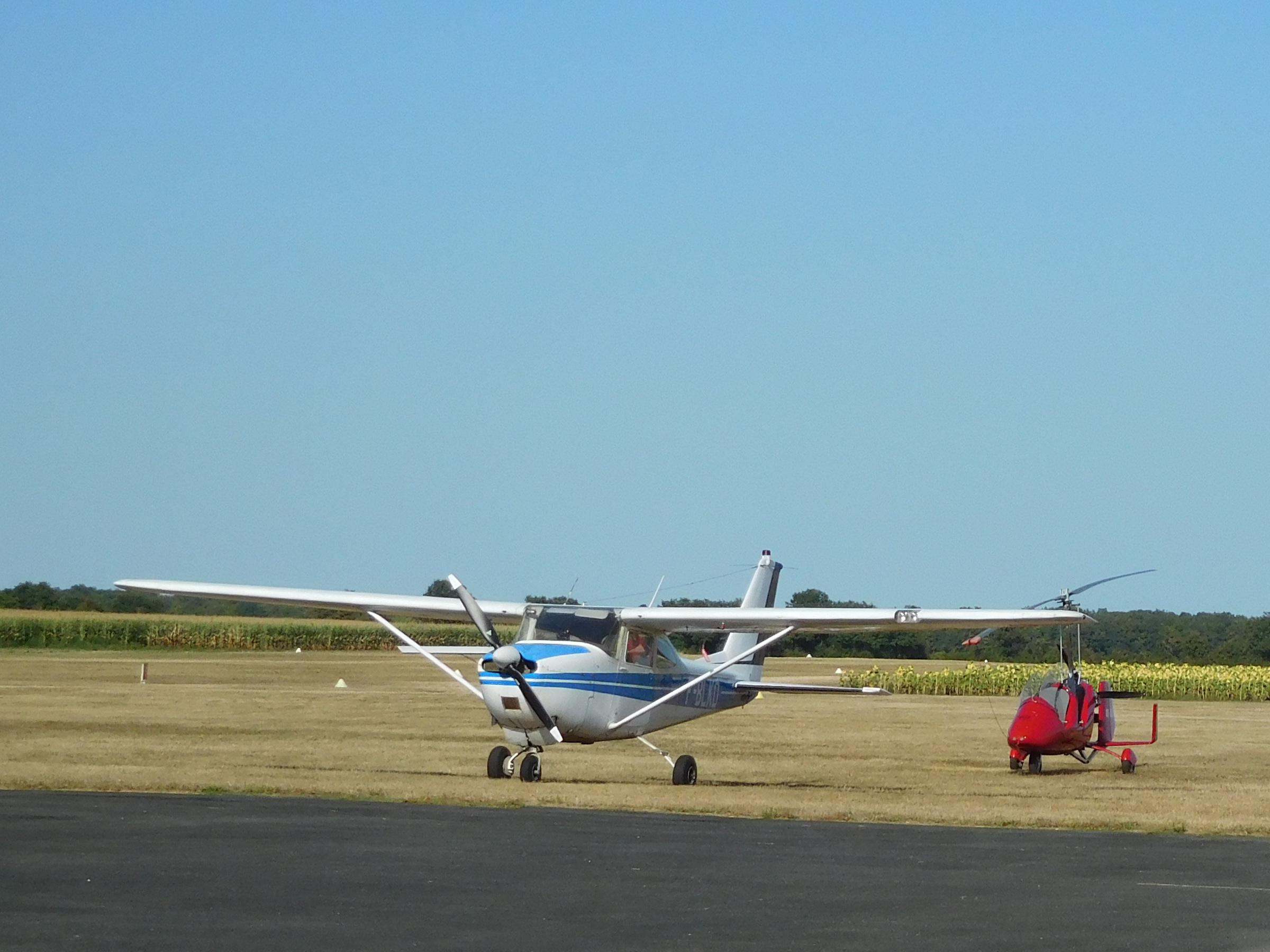
The third production Reims FP172D

P172D Powermatic

The 175 Skylark was rebranded for the 1963 model year as the P172D Powermatic, continuing where the Skylark left off at 175C. It was powered by a 175 hp (130 kW) Continental GO-300-E with a geared reduction drive powering a constant-speed propeller, increasing cruise speed by 11 mph (18 km/h) over the standard 172D. It differed from the 175C in that it had a cut-down rear fuselage with an "Omni-Vision" rear window and an increased horizontal stabilizer span. A deluxe version was marketed as the Skyhawk Powermatic with a slightly increased top speed. Despite the rebranding, sales did not meet expectations, and the 175 type was discontinued for the American civilian market after the 1963 model year. 65 were built, plus four by Reims as the FP172D.

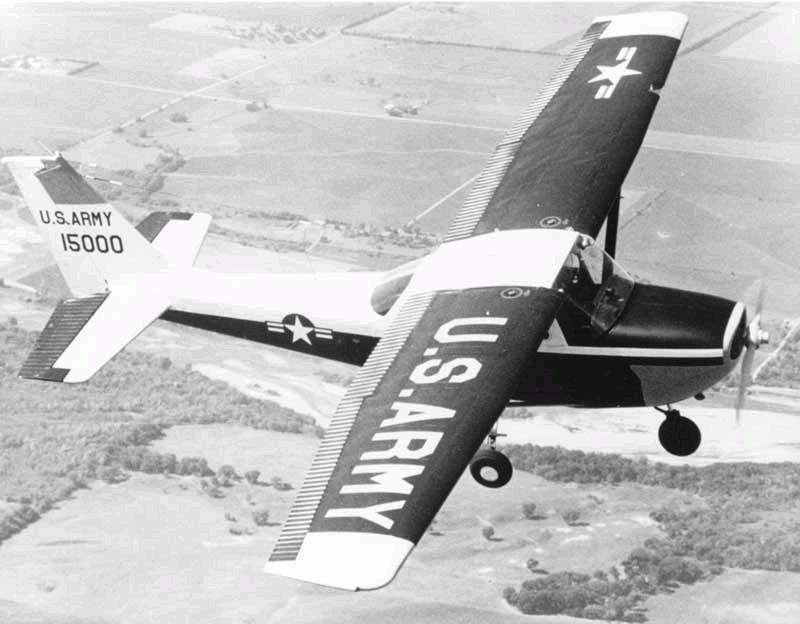
The first production R172E operating as a T-41B Mescalero with the US Army, c. 1967

R172E

Although the 175 type was discontinued for the civilian market, Cessna continued to produce the aircraft for the United States Armed Forces as the T-41 Mescalero. Introduced in 1967, the R172E was built in T-41B, T-41C, and T-41D variants for the US Army, USAF Academy, and US Military Aid Program, respectively. As the T-41B, the R172E is powered by a fuel-injected 210 hp (157 kW) Continental IO-360-D or -DE driving a constant-speed propeller, and features a 28V electrical system, jettisonable doors, an openable right front window, a 6.00x6 nose wheel tire and military avionics, but no baggage door. The T-41C was similar to the T-41B, but has a 14V electrical system, a fixed-pitch propeller, civilian avionics, and no rear seats. The T-41D features a 28V electrical system, four seats, corrosion-proofing, reinforced flaps and ailerons, a baggage door, and provisions for wing-mounted pylons. A total of 335 were built by Cessna. While Cessna produced the R172E exclusively for military use, Reims built a civilian model as the FR172E Reims Rocket, with 60 built for the 1968 model year. The Reims Rocket is most similar to the T-41D.

R172F

The R172F was similar to the R172E and was built exclusively in T-41D configuration. 74 were built by Cessna, plus 85 by Reims as the FR172F Reims Rocket for the 1969 model year.

R172G

The R172G was similar to the R172E/F, differing in that it was certified to be powered by a 210 hp (157 kW) Continental IO-360-C, -D, -CB, or -DB engine. 35 were built in assorted T-41C and T-41D variants, plus 80 by Reims as the FR172G Reims Rocket for the 1970 model year.

R172H

The R172H introduced the extended dorsal fillet of the 172L to the T-41D. It was also certified to be powered by a 210 hp (157 kW) Continental IO-360-C, -D, -H, -CB, -DB, or -HB engine. 176 were built, plus 125 by Reims as the FR172H Reims Rocket for the 1971 and 1972 model years.

R172J

Civilian model certified to be powered by a 210 hp (157 kW) Continental IO-360-H or -HB engine. Only one was built by Cessna for the 1974 model year, while Reims built 240 as the FR172J Reims Rocket for the 1973 through 1976 model years.

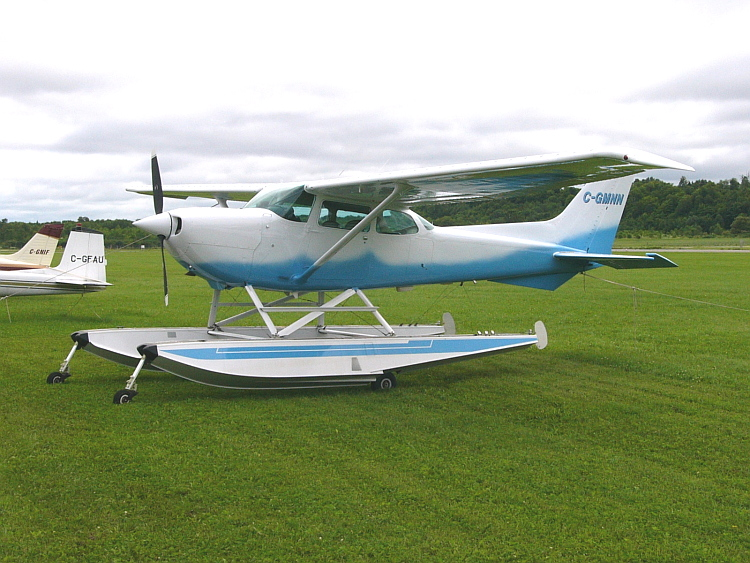
1977 Model R172K Hawk XP on Wipline amphibious floats

R172K Hawk XP

Following the success of the Reims Rocket in Europe, Cessna decided to once again produce the 175 type for the civilian market as the R172K Hawk XP, beginning with the 1977 model year. It was powered by a derated 195 hp (145 kW) Continental IO-360-K or -KB engine driving a McCauley constant-speed propeller and featured a new cowling with landing lights and an upgraded interior. The Hawk XP II was also available with full IFR avionics. A total of 1,456 were built by Cessna; 1 (1973 prototype), 725 (1977), 205 (1978), 270 (1979), 200 (1980), and 55 (1981). Reims also produced the variant as the FR172K (Note: Sources differ as to whether the FR172K was marketed as the "Reims Rocket" or "Hawk XP".) for the 1977 through 1981 model years, with a total of 85 being built; 30 (1977) and 55 (1978–81).

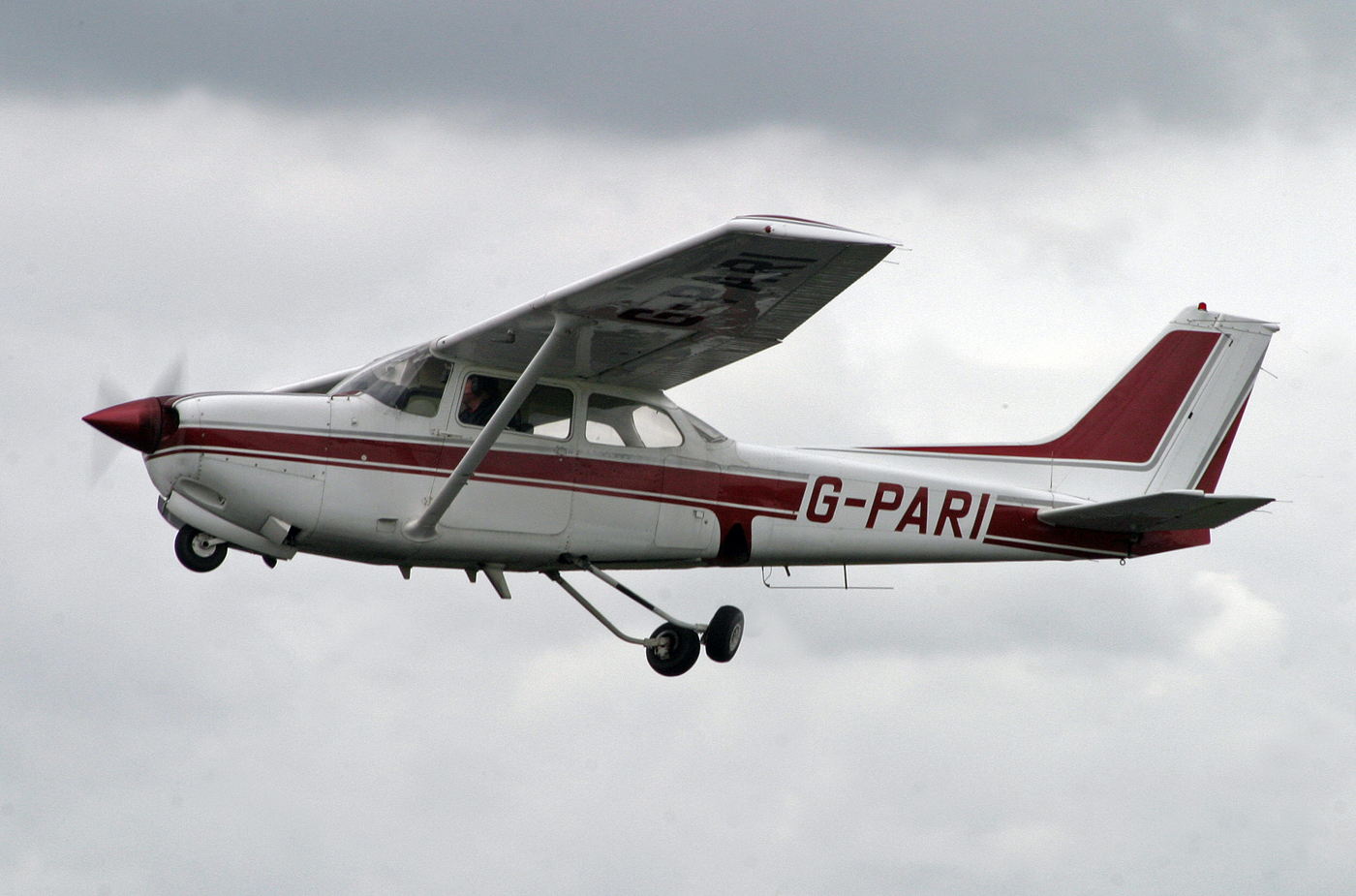
Cessna 172RG Cutlass RG in the process of retracting its landing gear

172RG Cutlass RG

Similar to the standard 172 but fitted with the retractable landing gear of the Cessna R182 Skylane RG and powered by a 180 hp (130 kW) Lycoming O-360-F1A6 engine driving a constant-speed propeller. These changes gave it an optimal cruise speed of 140 knots (260 km/h), compared to 122 knots (226 km/h) for the contemporary 160 horsepower (120 kW) 172N or 172P. It also had more fuel capacity than a standard Skyhawk, 62 US gallons (230 L; 52 imp gal) versus 53 US gallons (200 L; 44 imp gal), giving it greater range and endurance. No significant design updates were made to the 172RG during its production run. A total of 1,191 were built; 570 (1980), 321 (1981), 209 (1982), 45 (1983), 33 (1984), and 14 (1985).

== Operators ==
Chile

- The Chilean Army acquired 18 R172K Hawk XPs in 1978.

Ireland

- The Irish Air Corps operated eight FR172Hs and one FR172K as of 1982. Five FR172Hs remained in service until 2019.

== Specifications (R172K Hawk XP) ==
3-view drawing of P172D Powermatic

Data from Jane's All the World's Aircraft 1980–1981

General characteristics

- Crew: 1
- Capacity: 3 passengers, 200 lb (91 kg) of baggage
- Length: 27 ft 2 in (8.28 m)
- Wingspan: 35 ft 10 in (10.92 m)
- Height: 12 ft 5 in (3.78 m)
- Wing area: 174 sq ft (16.17 m^{2})
- Aspect ratio: 7.52
- Empty weight: 1,546 lb (701 kg)
- Max takeoff weight: 2,550 lb (1,157 kg)
- Fuel capacity: 52 US gal (197 L) total (49 UG gal (185 L) usable, or 66 US gal (250 L) usable with optional integral fuel cells)
- Wheelbase: 5 ft 4 in (1.63 m)
- Powerplant: 1 × Continental IO-360-K six-cylinder fuel-injected engine, 195 hp (145.4 kW)
- Propellers: 2-bladed McCauley Model ZA34C203/90DCA-14 constant-speed propeller

Performance

- Maximum speed: 153 mph (246 km/h, 133 kn) at sea level
- Cruise speed: 150 mph (241 km/h, 130 kn) with 80% power at 6,000 ft (1,830 m)
- Stall speed: 54 mph (87 km/h, 47 kn) with flaps down (60 mph (97 km/h, 52 kn) with flaps up)
- Range: 662 mi (1,065 km, 575 nmi) (938 mi (1,510 km, 815 nmi) with optional integral fuel cells)
- Service ceiling: 17,000 ft (5,180 m)
- Rate of climb: 870 ft/min (4.42 m/s) at sea level
- Takeoff distance: 800 ft (244 m)
- Landing distance: 635 ft (194 m)
