= Cessna 160 =

American light aircraft prototype

General information
- Type: Light Aircraft
- National origin: United States
- Manufacturer: Cessna
- Status: Canceled
- Number built: 1

History
- First flight: 1962
- Retired: 1974

The Cessna 160 was an American single-engine, four-seater, high wing, strut-braced, prototype monoplane designed in 1962 by Cessna.

Development beyond the prototype stage was not pursued and only one example was constructed.

== Development ==
Cessna thought that a less expensive four-seater aircraft than the existing Cessna 172 would have good market potential. The company designed a simplified four-seat high-wing aircraft using non-tapering wings, extensive use of heavily beaded wing and fuselage skins as well as free-castering nose gear to save weight and decrease the man-hours required for construction.

The aircraft was intended to be sold for US$8,450, which would have been just US$955 more than the 1962 model two-place Cessna 150B and far below the cost of the 1962 model Cessna 172C, which was US$9895.

The prototype aircraft was registered as N5419E and first flew in 1962, powered by a Franklin engine of 125 hp (93 kW). The intention was to use a 145 hp (108 kW) Continental O-300 engine for the production model.

The aircraft was subjected to a flight test program in 1962 and 1963. The Franklin engine gave the aircraft a top speed of 134 mph (216 km/h), while the proposed O-300 powered version was forecast to have a top speed of 143 mph (230 km/h). A proposed military version, tentatively designated Cessna 160M and powered by a 210 hp (157 kW) Continental IO-360, would have had a top speed of 174 mph (280 km/h).

The flight test program showed that, while the aircraft met its goals, it did not offer enough cost advantages to proceed to production when tooling costs were accounted for. As a result, the project was abandoned.

The sole prototype Cessna 160 was retained by the company until 1974, when it was sold as scrap. The scrap yard did not complete the destruction of the airframe and it was later offered for sale.

== See also ==
- Cessna 150
- Cessna 172
