= Sponge city =

Urban flood management concept

- Simplified Chinese: 海绵城市
- Traditional Chinese: 海綿城市
Transcriptions
Standard Mandarin
- Hanyu Pinyin: Hǎimián chéngshì
- Gwoyeu Romatzyh: Haemian cherngshyh
- Wade–Giles: Hai^{3}-mien^{2} chʻêng^{2}-shih^{4}
Hakka
- Romanization: Hói-mièn sàng-sṳ
Yue: Cantonese
- Yale Romanization: Hóimìhn sìhngsíh
- Jyutping: Hoi^{2}min^{4} sing^{4}si^{5}

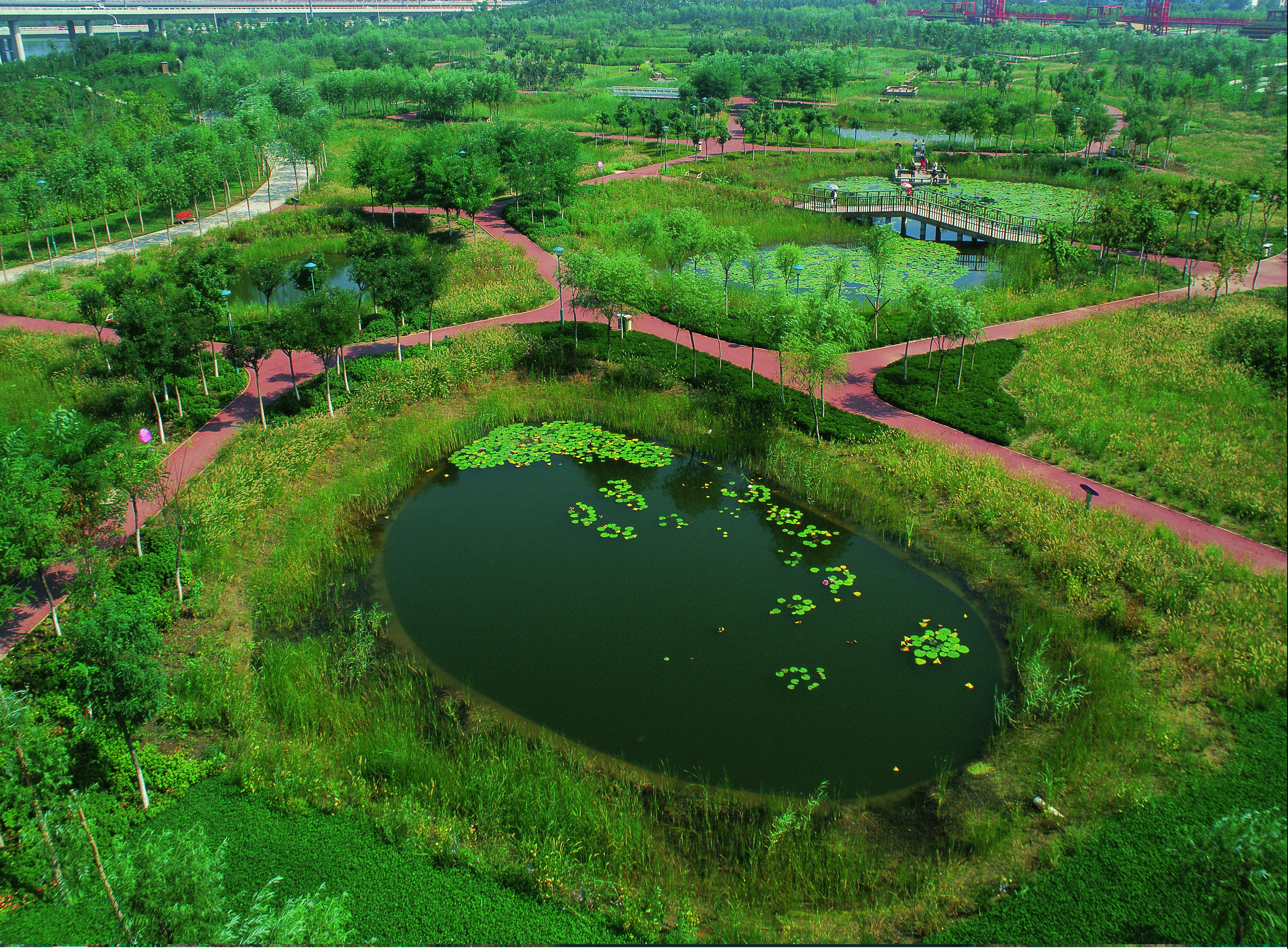
Tianjin Qiaoyuan Park in Tianjin City.

Sponge city (Chinese: 海绵城市) is a nature-based urban planning model originated in China that emphasizes the implementation of ecological infrastructures in urban hydrological management. Sponge cities focus on flood prevention and stormwater management via utilization of green infrastructure instead of purely relying on drainage systems. Urban flooding, water shortages and the heat island effect can be alleviated by having more urban parks, gardens, green spaces, wetlands, nature strips, and permeable paving, which will both improve ecological biodiversity for urban wildlife and reduce floods by serving as reservoirs for capturing, retaining and absorbing excess stormwater. The name comes from the analogy that greened landscapes can store, slow down and "soak up" surface water like sponges, thus helping other developed/settled areas stay dry. The concept has been inspired by ancient wisdom of adaptation to climate challenges, particularly in the monsoon regions in southeastern China that are prone to flash floods.

First proposed by landscape architect Kongjian Yu, the urban planning model has been accepted by the Chinese Communist Party (CCP) and the State Council as a nationwide urban development policy in 2014. According to Chinese authorities, "Sponge cities are part of a worldwide movement that goes by various names: 'green infrastructure' in Europe, 'low-impact development' (LID) in the United States, 'water-sensitive urban design' in Australia, 'natural infrastructure' in Peru, 'nature-based solutions' in Canada. However, sponge cities are often mixed up with these concepts, especially LID, but have major differences. Sponge cities use ecological and technical concepts whereas LID uses mostly technical concepts. Sponge city design assists in water quality, remediation, construction of habitats, and more beyond just flood mitigation and stormwater regulation. Hydro-ecological infrastructure and nature is interconnected across cities and watersheds with the sponge city design. This model preserves and restores ecosystems, allowing aquatic ecosystems to live in tandem with humans. In contrast to industrial management, in which people confine water with levees, channels and asphalt and rush it off the land as quickly as possible, these newer approaches seek to restore water's natural tendency to linger in places like wetlands and floodplains."

== Background ==
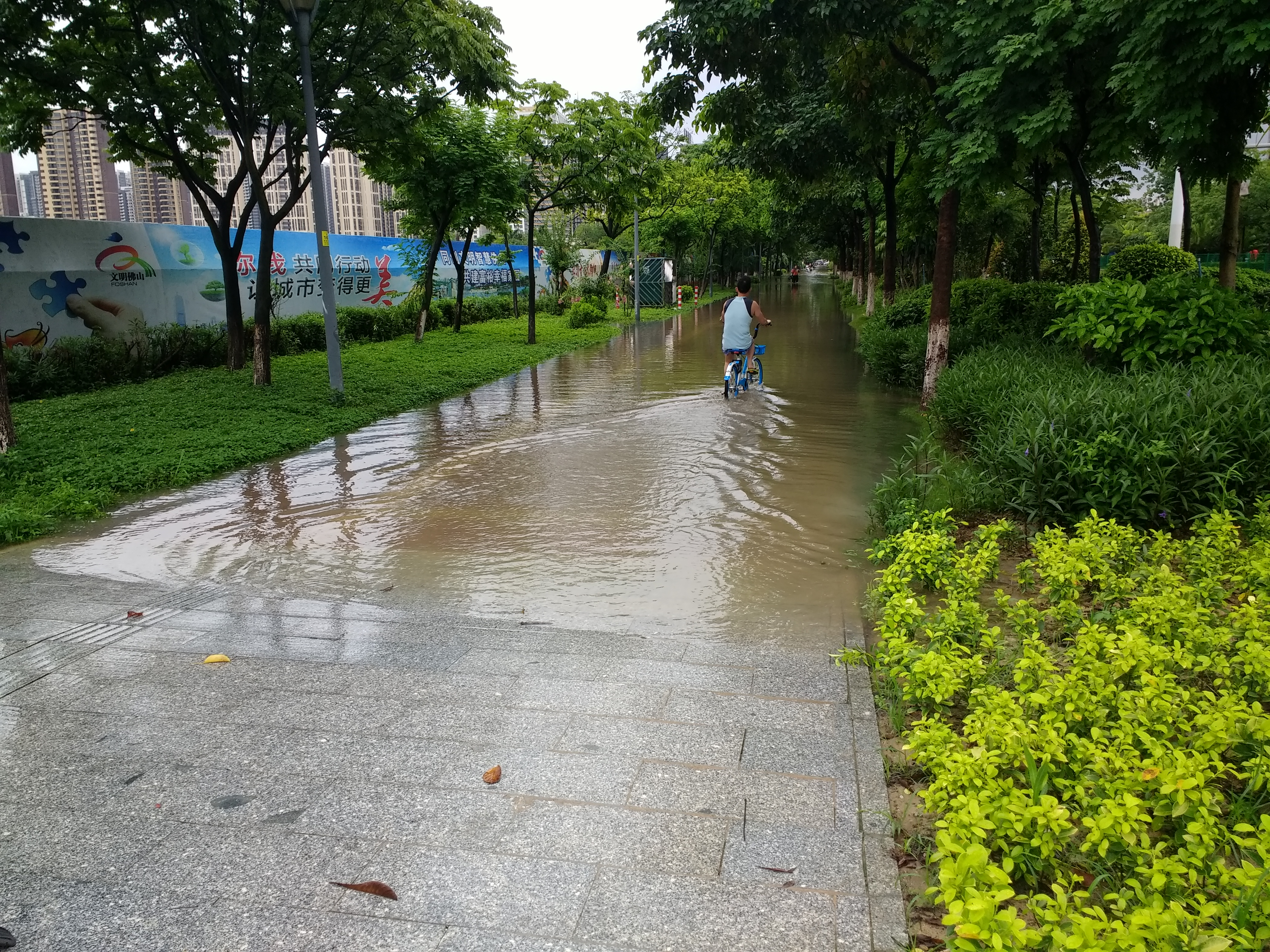
People biking on flooded pavement in Foshan

Urbanization encourages the construction of grey infrastructure in cities. Excessive use and development of grey infrastructure can lead to water shortages, pollution, and overall degradation of water ecosystem services. Current urban architectural planning also creates a large number of buildings, simultaneously limiting cities' green space, drainage, and rainwater collection ability. Consequently, rainfall cannot meet modern cities' water requirements and causes cities lots of problems regarding water ecology and aquatic environments.

Meanwhile, high-intensity artificial constructions, such as buildings, roads, and public squares, lead to the lower pad's excessive hardening, changing the original natural foundation and hydrological characteristics. Because of this, surface flow increases from 10% to 60%, while infiltration is drastically reduced, even to zero. According to an investigation that the Ministry of Housing and Urban‑Rural Development conducted in 2010, 62% of 351 cities across the country faced flooding between 2008 and 2010; 137 cities flooded more than three times during this time period. This frequent urban flooding makes more and more people recognize the importance of water ecosystems and urban ecological infrastructure. The simple concept of fast discharge, a traditional gray water management model, is no longer helpful in addressing the rainwater dilemma during rapid urbanization. To cope with such extensive urban water issues, China is increasingly attaching importance to urban flood management and water ecological-system services and vigorously promoting the idea of Sponge City.

== History ==
The People's Republic of China adopted the Sponge City initiative, largely motivated by the failure of the conventional grey infrastructure of flood control and stormwater management systems, due to the persistent efforts by Chinese ecological urbanists through letters and proposals sent to high level Chinese authorities since early 2000. Though the concept had been published and practiced since early 2000, it was the Beijing flood on July 21, 2012 which caused 79 deaths that prompted the top Chinese authorities to accept the Sponge City concept and make it a nationwide policy.

In 2015, China initiated a pilot initiative in 16 districts. In the years following, additional pilot district/cities were selected to continue implementing sponge city design. Four batches were selected by 2017, consisting of a total of 87 cities. The timeline for the sponge city pilot projects were as follows:

- 2015-2018: Implement sponge city design with small-scale urban pilot projects
- 2018-2020: Publish Sponge City standards, management, and monitoring
  - Recycle 70% of rainfall
- 2020-2030: Complete integration of Sponge Cities

The country plans for 80 percent of its urban cities to harvest and reuse 70 percent of rainwater. Building sponge cities does not necessarily require large investments. But such a fact has been widely misunderstood due to misleading media and the fact that the "sponge city" has been more than often misused by local government and contractors, as well as unprofessional designers as a fashionable brand and slogan which has actually nothing to do with this nature based solution. The major obstacles of implementing the nature-based sponge city are the business-as-usual mentality of grey infrastructure engineering, ornamental gardening and conventional urban planning, as well as the code systems that have been established to defend these obsolete urbanism practices. Funding sponge cities has also been a challenge.

After achieving success in China, the sponge city model has attracted over-exposed climate zones such as Dhaka and Kenya, as well as major cities like Berlin and Los Angeles.

On September 23, 2025, its developer Kongjian Yu died in a plane crash in the rural area of Pantanal-located municipality of Aquidauana, Mato Grosso do Sul, Brazil.

=== Pilot projects ===
==== First batch (2015) ====
Sixteen cities in China were chosen in 2015 for the first batch of pilot projects, as listed below:

- Baicheng
- Qian'an
- Jinan
- Hebi
- Xixian New Area
- Zhenjiang
- Jiaxing
- Chizhou
- Wuhan
- Changde
- Chongqing
- Suining
- Gui'an New Area
- Nanning
- Pingxiang
- Xiamen

==== Second batch (2016) ====
In 2016, a second batch of fifteen cities were chosen for pilot projects. Cities are listed below:

- Beijing
- Tianjin
- Dalian
- Qingyang
- Guyuan
- Xining
- Shanghai
- Ningbo
- Fuzhou
- Shenzhen
- Zhuhai
- Yuxi
- Sanya

== Design principles ==
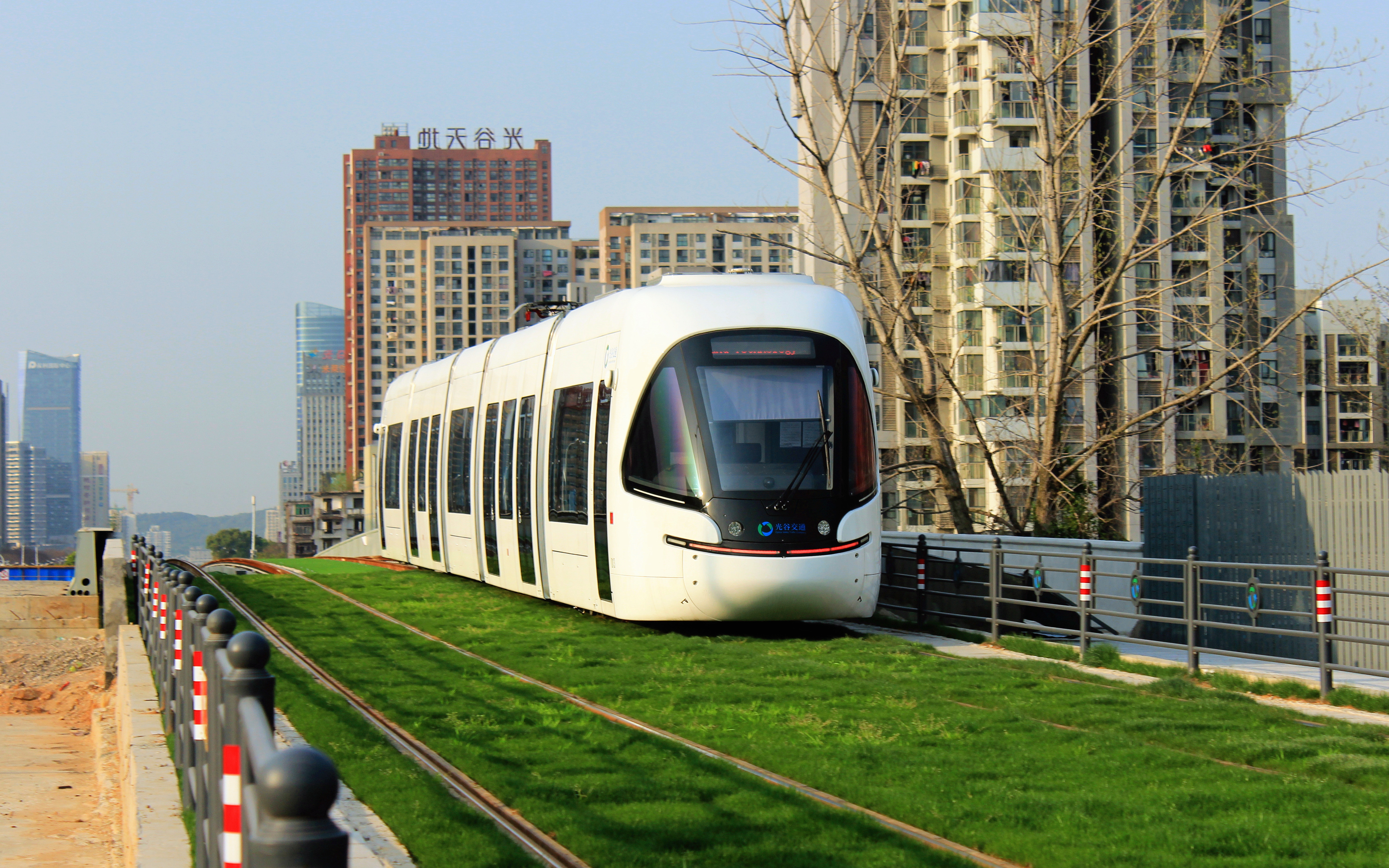
Wuhan Optics Valley Modern Tram was built using green track, which reduces surface run-off and provides other environmental benefits.

The Sponge City philosophy is to distribute and retain water at its source, slow down water as it flows away from its source, clean water naturally, and adapt to water at the sink when water accumulates. This is in stark contrast to the conventional solution of grey infrastructure, which is to centralize and accumulate water using big reservoirs, speed up the flow by pipes and channelized drains, and fight against water at the end by higher and stronger flood walls and dams. The theory of Sponge City emphasizes the basic principles of 'based on nature', 'source control', 'local adaption', protecting nature, learning from nature, preserving urban ecological space as much as possible, restoring biodiversity, and creating a beautiful landscape environment. All of this can be realized by achieving natural absorption, natural infiltration, and natural purification. These principles come from long-standing wisdom and strategies practiced across China for thousands of years, when water had to be worked with and around instead of combatted with gray infrastructure. The infiltration effects of the natural ecological background (such as topography and landforms), the purification effect of vegetation and wetlands on water quality, and the combination of natural and artificial means allow the city to absorb and release rainwater. Urban green spaces and urban bodies of water —constructed wetlands, rain gardens, green roofs, recessed green spaces, grass ditches, and ecological parks—are the central "sponge bodies".

There are three main facets to developing such systems: protecting the original urban ecosystem, ecological restoration, and low-impact development.

- Protection focuses on the city's original ecologically sensitive areas, such as rivers, lakes, and ditches. Natural vegetation, soil, and microorganisms are used to gradually treat the aquatic environment and restore the damaged urban ecosystem.
- Restoration measures include identifying ecological patches, constructing ecological corridors, strengthening the connections between the patches, forming a network, and delineating the blue and green lines to restore the aquatic ecological environment.
- Mandatory measures apply to urban roads, urban green spaces, urban water systems, residential areas, and specific buildings to protect ecological patches, maintain their storage capacity, strengthen source control, and form ecological sponges of different scales.

With these design principles in mind, they can be applied at three different levels/scales:

- Macro-scale: regional or watershed level for regional master plans
- Meso Scale: planning at city, township, village level
- Micro scale: individual "sponge units" within meso scale. Examples include parks and neighborhoods

Sponge city policies have been more frequently implemented in new construction than in retrofitted developments from the past few decades of rapid urbanization. Xiamen's Yangfang residential area and Shanghai's Langang Park are two new developments indicative of this trend. Shougang park, the former site of a steel mill which was redeveloped into a park which includes the 2022 Winter Olympics venue Big Air Shougang, incorporates sponge city design concepts.

== Political applications ==
In his speech at the Urbanization Work Conference on December 12, 2013, CCP general secretary Xi Jinping said "When upgrading the urban drainage system, priority should be given to retaining limited rainwater and using the power of nature to drain water. Build a sponge city with natural retention, natural penetration, and natural purification." To this end, in October 2014, the Ministry of Housing and Urban-Rural Development issued "Technical Guidelines for Sponge City Construction", emphasizing the importance of the top-level design of urban rainwater management, as well as planning to guide urban construction with ecological priority as the basic principle.

In August 2015, the "Sponge City Construction Performance Evaluation Method" clarified requirements for the use of central fiscal funds and provided guidelines for the construction effectiveness of pilot demonstration cities. According to the guidelines and related standards and specifications, the China Building Standard Design and Research Institute has initially established a "sponge city construction standard design system", including newly built, expanded, and rebuilt sponge buildings and communities, roads and squares, parks, green spaces, and urban water systems.

The General Office of the State Council Guideline to promote building sponge cities (Guobanfa [2015] No. 75) pointed out that the construction of sponge cities occurs through strengthening the management of urban planning and construction, giving full play to the impact of buildings, roads, green spaces, and water systems on rainwater. Under the guideline, cities in China will collect and utilize 70 percent of the rainwater, with 20 percent of urban areas meeting the target by 2020, and the proportion will increase to 80 percent by 2030.

In 2015 and 2016, pilot projects for sponge cities were organized with the support of national policies. Sixteen cities, including Zhenjiang, Jiaxing, and Xiamen, were selected as the first batch of pilot cities, and 14 cities, including Shenzhen, Shanghai, Tianjin, and Beijing, were selected as the second batch of pilot cities to carry out the construction of sponge cities in an orderly manner. In addition, the Central Ministry of Finance introduced a public-private partnership (PPP) model to increase financial policy support.

However, this set-up may threaten local government's ability to fund these programs, which are estimated to require $230 billion by 2030 in order to meet their goals. The national government is only planning to subsidize one-fifth of the costs of implementing Sponge City policies, and the flooding of over half of pilot cities – such as Ningbo – since the program started has the potential to worry private investors.

China's central government mandates that by 2030, 80% of China's urban space must include sponge city adaptations and must recycle at least 70% of rainfall.

== Effectiveness and monitoring ==
Sponge cities have been shown to achieve the following:

- recharge ground water
- adapt to disaster/change
- environmental restoration
- less reliance on municipal pipelines
- improve ecology of city
- water purification through plants
- prevention of sewer overflow
- reduce stormwater runoff
- flood mitigation
- provide ecosystem services
- Interconnection/communication between cities

Studies have shown that sponge cities are highly effective in reducing stormwater runoff and improving water quality. The effectiveness of sponge cities has been evaluated through modeling or through observation as monitoring data is not widely available. Monitoring data has been difficult to obtain due to the lack of monitoring data and evaluation standards published by the government.

Currently, flood mitigation impacts are often local instead of city-wide due to local-scale projects and planning. Nineteen of the thirty pilot cities has experienced flooding since implementation. However, local areas within cities that were retrofitted with the sponge city concept in mind have experienced little to no flooding in response to big storms.

== Key examples ==
=== Luotian River ===
The Luotian River, with a length of about 8 kilometers, has adopted an ecological control method to regulate stormwater. As a part of the Luotian Water Comprehensive Regulation Project, the river channel was widened to restore the riparian areas and existing reservoirs were expanded to become storage lakes for rainfall. Rainfall was also used as a water supply instead of bypass to the river. Data revealed that the sponge city design allowed water quality to increase and flooding to decrease. The natural connectivity of the river required communication and planning between cities along the river to be successful.

=== Gui-an New District ===
One of the pilot cities, the Gui-an New District was established in 2014. $1 billion USD was invested into sponge city design, with an emphasis on pervious paving, as well as 70 monitoring stations. However, as of 2022, much of the sponge city design is undeveloped, including the monitoring stations. Pervious concrete has been laid down but often not maintained. Modeling revealed that flooding risk is lowered but is not entirely eradicated from sponge city design thus far. Flood mitigation success is determined by the intensity of the rainfall event.

=== Sanya City, Hainan Island ===
Sanya City is a pilot city that was a part of the second batch of pilot cities. On an island, the city has experienced flooding and habitat degradation. A mangrove park and wetland park were established to mitigate this impacts and restore the ecological environment.

==== Sanya Mangrove Park ====
A 10 hectare site on the bank of Linchun River was restored into a mangrove to help with flood resilience. Urbanization allowed concrete flood walls to be built to prevent flooding, degrading the mangrove habitat in the process. The area was made into a mangrove park by restoring riparian habitats. An interlocking finger design (ecotones) was used for the land to reduce the force of ocean tides and storm surges, preventing damage to mangroves. Terraces from the city streets to the river elevation was implemented with bio-swales to catch and filter runoff. Three years after construction, ecological restoration and flood mitigation has been successful. The mangrove is still healthy and growing as a result of the flood mitigation and water quality improvements, attracting biodiversity and ecotourism.

==== Dong'an Wetland Park ====
Located in downtown Sanya, the 68-hectare park was previously polluted with illegally dumping and overgrown with invasive species. Pond-and-dike systems were established to catch water and filter runoff. A forested wetland was established in the middle of the park, with recreational areas at the edges. The wetland is designed to store 830,000 cubic meters of stormwater, which will reduce flood risk. Surrounding communities have experienced less urban flooding and polluted runoff. The park has attracted biodiversity and recreation to the area.

=== Benjakitti Forest Park ===
Benjakitti Forest Park is located in downtown Bangkok, Thailand. The plot of land was previously a brownfield as a result of a tobacco factory, and experienced subsidence and flooding due to urbanization. The 52.7 square hectometers of land was developed by Turenscape into a public green space in 2023, designed with 187,500 cubic meters of stormwater storage capacity. This storage prepares for a 10-year rainfall event, proving effective in 2022 when much of Bangkok flooded but the park and surrounding area did not. In addition to rainwater management, the park includes: sponge wetlands, a recreational boardwalk system, an amphitheater designed to be safe to flood, warehouses for sports and museums, and ecological environments for flora and fauna. The project was created with low budget ($20 USD per square meter) and low maintenance in mind.

== See also ==
- Green infrastructure for stormwater management/Low-impact development (North America)
- Nature-based solutions (European Union)
- Water-sensitive urban design (Australia)
