= Continental O-300 =

American piston aircraft engine

O-300
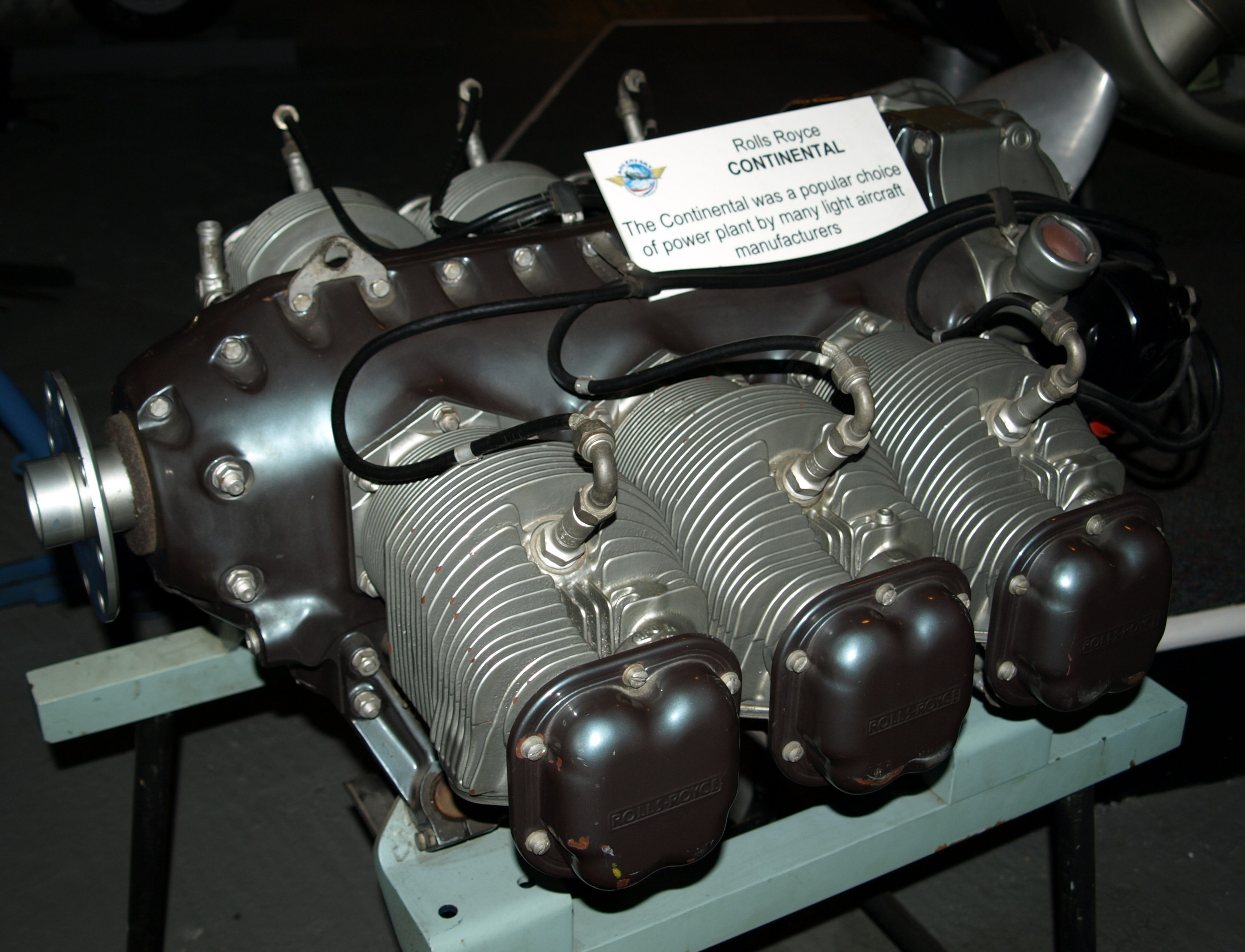
- Rolls-Royce Continental O-300 on display at the Solent Sky museum, England.
- Type: Piston aircraft engine
- National origin: United States
- Manufacturer: Continental Motors
- Major applications: Cessna 172; Cessna T-41 A Mescalero; Cessna 175 Skylark; Cessna 170; Maule M-4
- Manufactured: 1947–present
- Developed from: Continental C-125

The Continental O-300 and the C145 are a family of air-cooled flat-6 aircraft piston engines built by Teledyne Continental Motors.

First produced in 1947, versions were still in production as of 2004. It was produced under licence in the United Kingdom by Rolls-Royce in the 1960s.

== Development ==
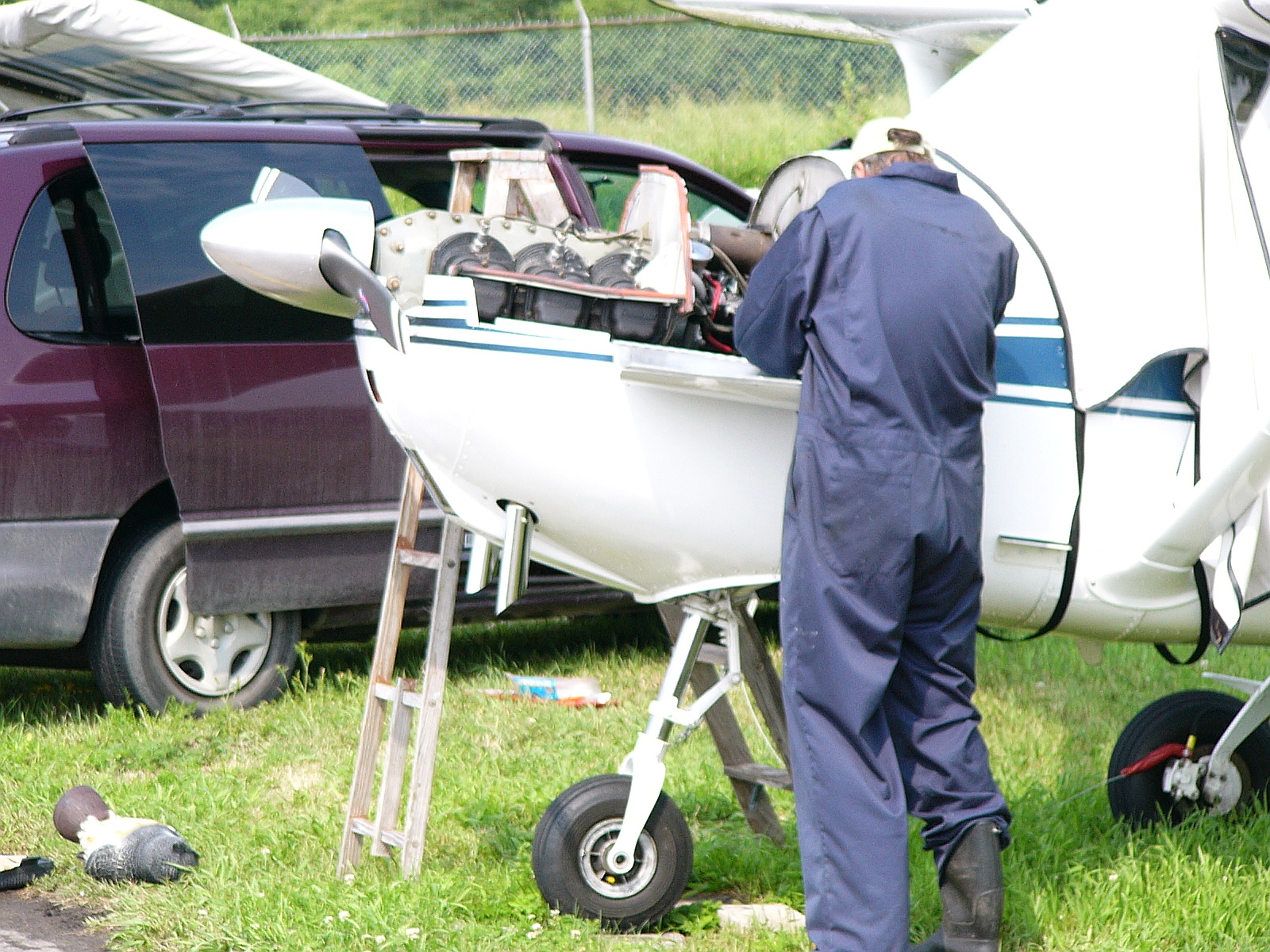
Continental O-300 engine installation in a Cessna 172

The C-145 was developed from the 125 hp (93 kW) C-125 engine. Both powerplants share the same crankcase, although the C-145 produces an additional 20 hp (15 kW) through a longer piston stroke, higher compression ratio of 7.0:1 and different carburetor jetting.

The O-300 is a modernized C-145 and retains the same weight, dimensions, bore, stroke, compression ratio, displacement and output power of the earlier engine.

=== GO-300 ===
The GO-300 employs a reduction gearbox, so that the engine turns at 3200 rpm to produce a propeller rpm of 2400. The GO-300 produces 175 hp (130 kW) whereas the ungeared O-300 produces 145 hp (108 kW).

The GO-300 engine has a TBO (Time Between Overhaul) of 1200 hours, while 1800 hours is the standard for ungeared O-300 engines. The GO-300 engine suffered reliability problems as a result of pilots mishandling the engine and operating it at too low an engine rpm. This caused the Cessna Skylark to develop a poor reputation for engine reliability. Many Skylarks flying today have been converted to different, larger-displacement, direct-drive engines.

== Variants ==
C145
Six-cylinder, 145 hp (108 kW), direct-drive engine.
C145-2
O-300
Modernized C145, 145 hp (108 kW), direct drive engine.
O-300-A
O-300-B
O-300-C
O-300-D
O-300-E
Limited production for the Beagle B.218X twin that never went into production
GO-300
Geared O-300, 175 hp (130 kW) at 3200 crankshaft rpm, 2400 propeller rpm.
GO-300-A
GO-300-C
GO-300-D
Voyager 300
Liquid-cooled, fuel-injected version developing 170 hp (127 kW) at 2,700 rpm.
Rolls-Royce-Continental O-300
Licence production in the United Kingdom.

== Applications ==
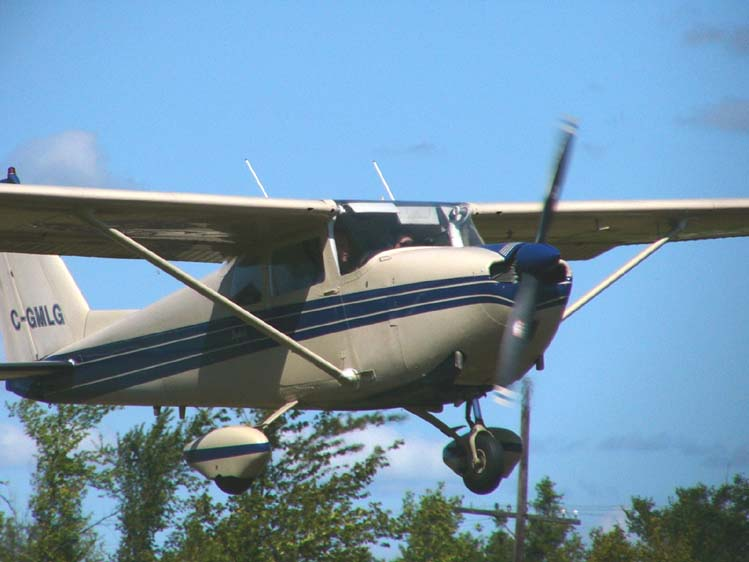
Cessna 175 showing the cowling bulge behind the propeller hub created by the GO-300 reduction gearbox

=== O-300 ===
- Aeronca Sedan
- Baumann Brigadier
- Cessna 160 - intended for production model
- Cessna 170
- Cessna 172 and T-41 Mescalero
- Maule M-4
- Meyers MAC-145
- Taylorcraft 15
- Temco TE-1A

=== GO-300 ===
- Cessna 175
- Goodyear GZ-19 and GZ-19A

=== Voyager 300 ===
- Alexeev Strizh

== Specifications (O-300) ==
Reference: Engines for Homebuilt Aircraft & Ultralights

=== General characteristics ===
- Type: 6-cylinder air-cooled horizontally opposed aircraft piston engine
- Bore: 4 1/16 in (4.0625 in resp. 103.12 mm)
- Stroke: 3 7/8 in (3.875 in resp. 98.425 mm)
- Displacement: 301.4 in³ (4.94 L)
- Length: 39.75 in (101.0 cm)
- Width: 31.5 in (80.0 cm)
- Height: 23.25 in (59.0 cm)
- Dry weight: 268 lbs (121.5 kg) dry, without starter or generator

=== Components ===
- Cooling system: Air-cooled

=== Performance ===
- Power output: 145 hp (108 kW) at 2,700 rpm
- Specific power: 0.58 hp/in³ (26.5 kW/L)
- Compression ratio: 7.0:1
- Power-to-weight ratio: 0.54 hp/lb (0.89 kW/kg)

== See also ==
Related lists

- List of aircraft engines
