= Panama City Airport =

Panama City Airport may refer to:

- Tocumen International Airport (PTY/MPTO), the main international airport serving Panama City, Panama
- Marcos A. Gelabert International Airport (PAC/MPMG), a smaller domestic airport serving Panama City, Panama
- Panamá Pacífico International Airport (BLP/MPPA), a second international airport used by budget airlines serving Panama City, Panama
- Northwest Florida Beaches International Airport (ECP/KECP), serving Panama City, Florida, United States
- Panama City–Bay County International Airport, former airport in Florida replaced by ECP/KECP
