= KPFN =

KPFN may refer to:

- KPFN-LP, a low-power radio station (105.1 FM) licensed to serve Laytonville, California, United States
- (ICAO code KPFN) Panama City–Bay County International Airport
