= Atlantic Southeast Airlines Flight 2254 =

1990 mid-air collision

Accident
- Date: April 9, 1990
- Summary: Mid-air collision
- Site: Gadsden, Alabama, United States; 33°58′37.57″N 86°5′41.55″W
- Total fatalities: 2
- Total survivors: 7

First aircraft
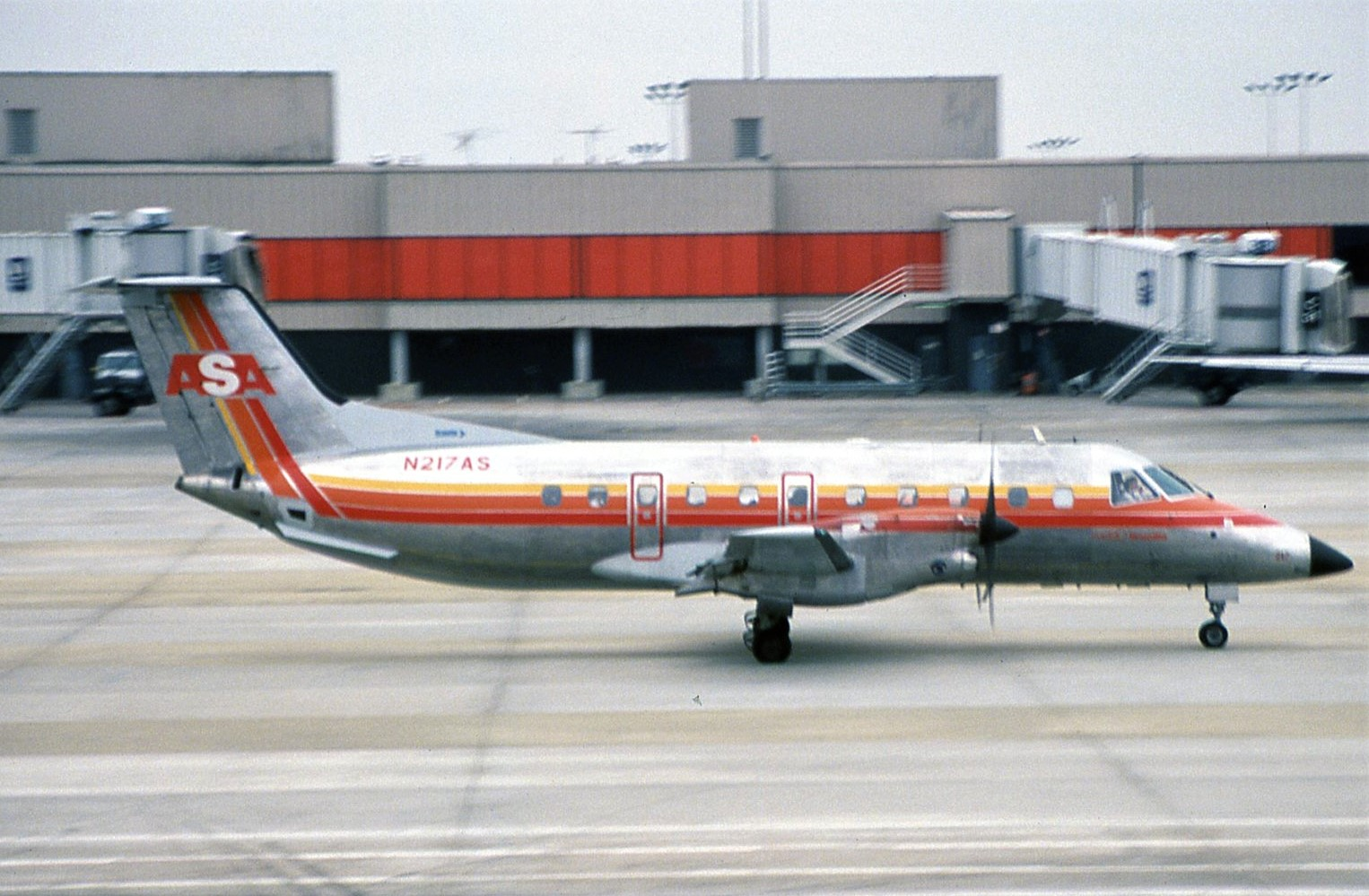
- N217AS, the Embraer EMB-120 involved in the collision, seen in March 1989.
- Type: Embraer 120RT Brasilia
- Operator: Atlantic Southeast Airlines d/b/a Delta Connection
- IATA flight No.: EV2254
- ICAO flight No.: ASQ2254
- Call sign: ACEY 2254
- Registration: N217AS
- Flight origin: Northwest Alabama Regional Airport; Muscle Shoals, Alabama
- Stopover: Northeast Alabama Regional Airport; Gadsden, Alabama
- Destination: Hartsfield-Jackson International Airport; Atlanta, Georgia
- Occupants: 7
- Passengers: 4
- Crew: 3
- Fatalities: 0
- Survivors: 7

Second aircraft
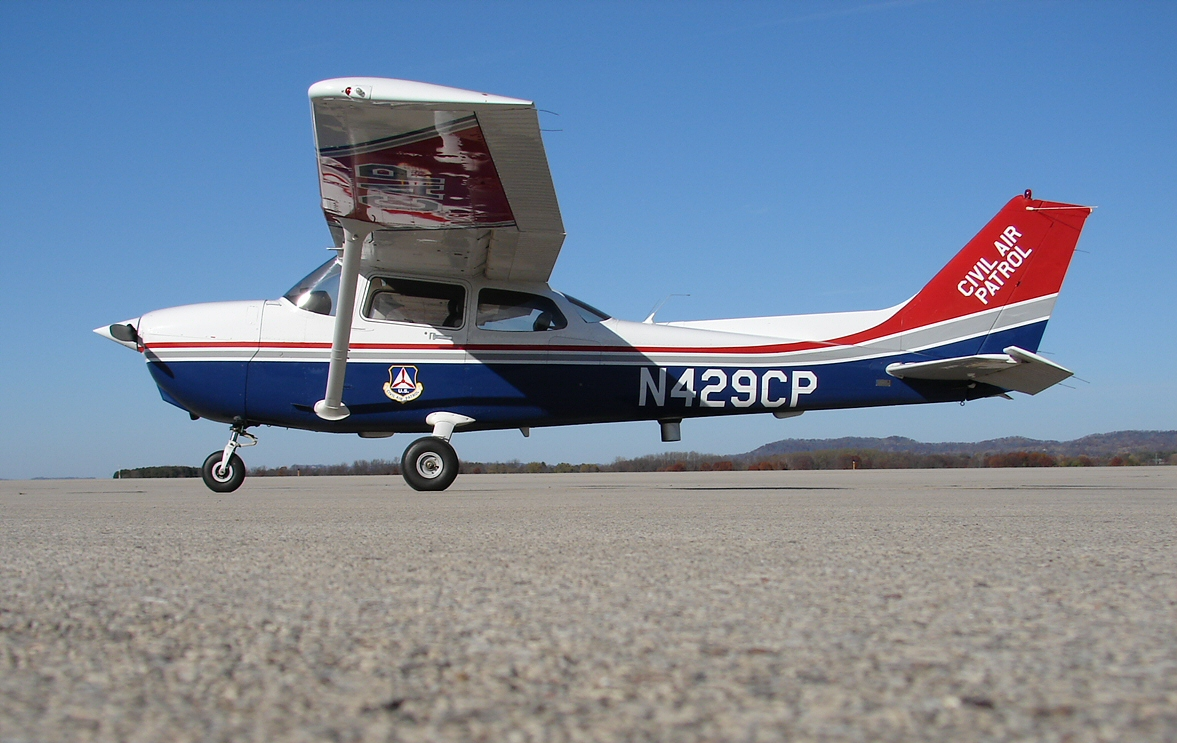
- N429CP, an aircraft similar to the one involved
- Type: Cessna 172
- Operator: Civil Air Patrol
- Registration: N99501
- Flight origin: Northeast Alabama Regional Airport; Gadsden, Alabama
- Destination: Northeast Alabama Regional Airport; Gadsden, Alabama
- Occupants: 2
- Passengers: 1
- Crew: 1
- Fatalities: 2
- Survivors: 0

On April 9, 1990, Atlantic Southeast Airlines Flight 2254, a scheduled passenger flight from Muscle Shoals, Alabama, to Gadsden, Alabama, to Atlanta, Georgia, was involved in a mid-air collision with a Cessna 172 over Gadsden. The collision resulted in the death of the pilot and passenger of the Cessna 172, whereas the Embraer 120 landed safely, saving all seven people on board.

== Aircraft ==
Atlantic Southeast Airlines Flight 2254 was operated under 14 CFR 135 with an Embraer EMB 120 Brasilia (registration N217AS) under the Delta Connection brand.

The second aircraft was a Cessna 172 (registration N99501), operated by two Civil Air Patrol pilots.

== Accident ==
Flight 2254 departed Muscle Shoals, Alabama, en route to Atlanta with a scheduled intermediate stop at the Northeast Alabama Regional Airport in Gadsden, Alabama. The flight from Muscle Shoals to Gadsden was without incident.

Flight 2254 departed Gadsden from Runway 24, with Captain William Query (56) and First Officer Quentin Haynes at the controls. The aircraft turned left toward the east along its intended flight path to Atlanta, climbing toward an assigned altitude of 5,000 feet. The Cessna 172 was westbound at the same altitude, facing the setting sun. The two aircraft collided at approximately 6:05 p.m. Central Daylight Time.

As a result of the head-on collision, Flight 2254's right horizontal stabilizer was torn from the aircraft. Though significantly damaged, Flight 2254 managed to return to the airport with no injuries to occupants. The Cessna 172 crashed into a field, resulting in fatal injuries to both occupants. The ASA crew reported afterward that they saw the Cessna moments before impact, and that the captain attempted evasive action by pushing the nose down, but was unable to avoid the collision. An eyewitness who saw the collision did not report any evasive maneuvers by either aircraft prior to the accident.

== Probable cause ==
The probable cause of the crash was attributed by the NTSB to be "inadequate visual lookout by the pilots of both aircraft, which resulted in their failure to see and avoid oncoming traffic. A factor related to the accident was the sun's glare, which restricted the vision of the Cessna 172 pilot."

== See also ==
Similar accidents between a scheduled commercial flight and a private aircraft in the immediate airport environment include:

- Aeroméxico Flight 498
- Pacific Southwest Airlines Flight 182
- Golden West Airlines Flight 261
- Piedmont Airlines Flight 22
