= Air New Orleans =

Airline based in Birmingham, Alabama

IATA	ICAO	Call sign
NT	ANL	Air New Orleans
- Founded: 1981; 45 years ago
- Ceased operations: 1988; 38 years ago
- Hubs: New Orleans International Airport; Birmingham International Airport
- Destinations: Southeastern United States
- Headquarters: Birmingham, Alabama (1986-1988); Panama City, Florida (1981-1986)

Air New Orleans was an airline based in Birmingham, Alabama that was conceived as a commuter air carrier to provide scheduled passenger service to cities throughout the Southeastern United States from Texas to Florida. The airline was founded in 1981 in Panama City, Florida and operated scheduled passenger service between 1981 and 1988.

== History ==
Despite its name, the airline's original headquarters was in Panama City, Florida with some executive offices being located in New Orleans. However, in 1986, the airline moved its headquarters to Birmingham, Alabama, and was located there until its closure in 1988.

In June 1986, Air New Orleans was operating service as a Continental Express air carrier via a code sharing agreement with Continental Airlines in order to provide passenger feed in and out of New Orleans (MSY) flown with British Aerospace BAe Jetstream 31 and Beechcraft C99 commuter turboprops. By early 1987, Air New Orleans was operating Continental Express service between New Orleans and Birmingham, AL (BHM), Gulfport, MS (GPT), Fort Walton Beach, FL (VPS), Jacksonville, FL (JAX), Mobile, AL (MOB), Orlando, FL (MCO), Panama City, FL (PFN), Pensacola, FL (PNS) and Tallahassee, FL (TLH) according to the Feb. 1, 1987 Continental Airlines system timetable.

By January 1988, the airline would file for Chapter 11 bankruptcy, and would subsequently cease operation on June 17, 1988.

== Fleet ==
- 8 – Beechcraft C99 turboprops
- 5 – Piper Aircraft twin piston engine commuter
- 4 – British Aerospace BAe Jetstream 31 turboprops
- ? – GAF Nomad

== Accidents and incidents ==
- On May 26, 1987, a Continental Express flight, operated by Air New Orleans with a British Aerospace BAe Jetstream 31 commuter propjet (Registration N331CY) flying as flight 962, crash landed just after takeoff from New Orleans International Airport. The plane crashed into eight lanes of traffic on U.S. 61 adjacent to the airfield and subsequently injured two persons on the ground. Of the 11 occupants on board, there were zero fatalities. The cause of the crash was attributed to pilot error, including failing to follow checklists.

== Destinations served ==
Air New Orleans served the following destinations at various times during its existence with not all of these destinations being served at the same time:

- Louisiana
  - New Orleans (New Orleans International Airport) - Hub
  - Lafayette (Lafayette Regional Airport)
  - Lake Charles (Lake Charles Regional Airport)
- Mississippi
  - Gulfport (Gulfport-Biloxi International Airport)
  - Laurel/Hattiesburg (Hattiesburg-Laurel Regional Airport)
- Alabama
  - Birmingham (Birmingham International Airport) - Hub
  - Gadsden (Gadsden Municipal Airport)*
  - Gulf Shores (Jack Edwards National Airport)
  - Huntsville (Huntsville Municipal Airport)
  - Mobile (Mobile Regional Airport)
  - Montgomery (Montgomery Regional Airport)
- Florida
  - Fort Lauderdale (Fort Lauderdale-Hollywood International Airport)
  - Ft. Myers (Southwest Florida International Airport)
  - Fort Walton Beach (Okaloosa Regional Airport) (now Northwest Florida Regional Airport co-located on Eglin Air Force Base)
  - Jacksonville (Jacksonville International Airport)
  - Miami (Miami International Airport)
  - Orlando (Orlando International Airport)
  - Panama City (Panama City-Bay County International Airport)
  - Pensacola (Pensacola Regional Airport)
  - Sarasota (Sarasota-Bradenton International Airport)
  - Tallahassee (Tallahassee Regional Airport)
  - Tampa (Tampa International Airport)
  - West Palm Beach (Palm Beach International Airport)
- Texas
  - Dallas (Dallas/Fort Worth International Airport)
  - Houston (Houston Intercontinental Airport)

== See also ==
- List of defunct airlines of the United States
