= Cessna 172 =

Propeller driven single engine aircraft

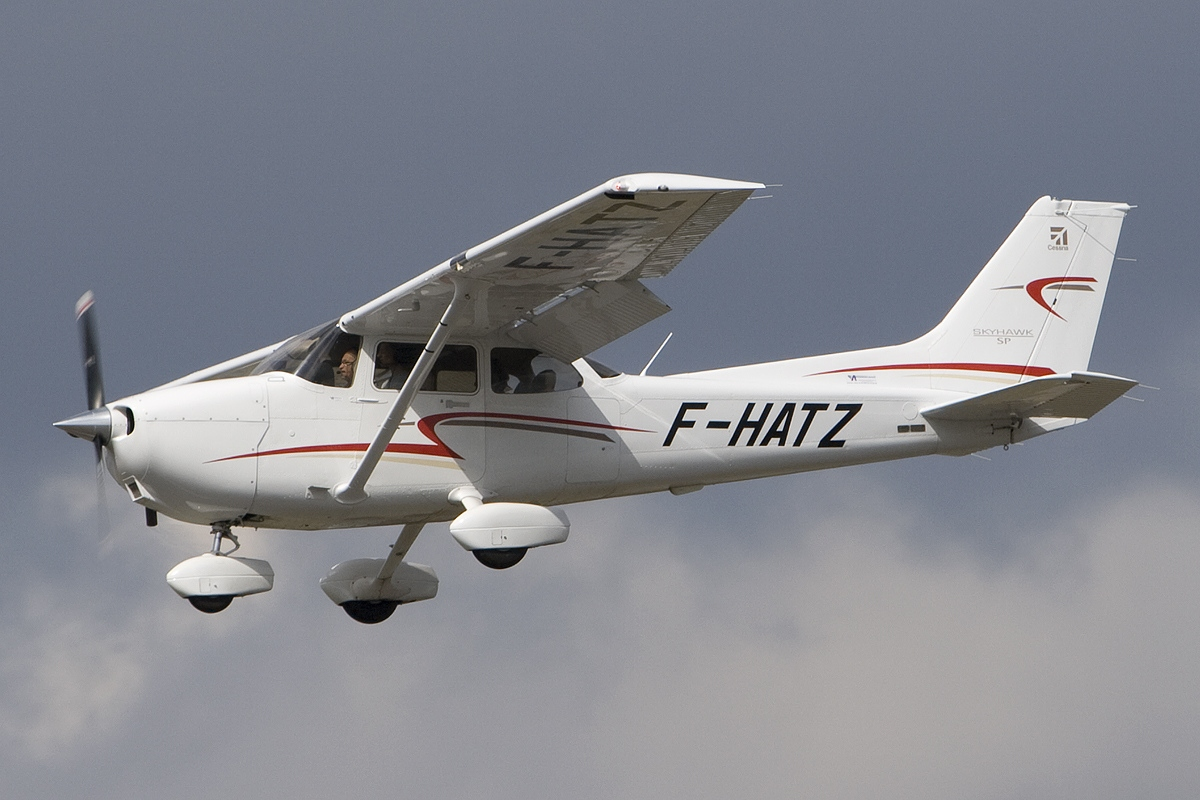
- Cessna 172S Skyhawk SP

General information
- Type: Civil utility aircraft
- National origin: United States
- Manufacturer: Cessna; Textron Aviation
- Status: In production
- Number built: 44,000+

History
- Manufactured: 1956–1986, 1996–present
- Introduction date: 1956
- First flight: June 12, 1955
- Developed from: Cessna 170
- Variant: Cessna T-41 Mescalero
- Developed into: Cessna 175 Skylark; Cessna R172

The Cessna 172 Skyhawk is an American four-seat, single-engine, high wing, fixed-wing aircraft made by the Cessna Aircraft Company. First flown in 1955, more 172s have been built than any other aircraft. It was developed from the Cessna 170, which was first manufactured in 1948, but with tricycle landing gear rather than conventional landing gear. The Skyhawk name was originally used for a trim package, but was later applied to all standard-production 172 aircraft; in the 1980s, the 172 was briefly marketed as the Cutlass. The 172 was also produced under license in France by Reims Aviation. The 172 was developed into the more powerful but less successful Cessna 175; after that aircraft's discontinuation, Cessna and Reims used the 175 type certificate to develop the R172 series, which includes several aircraft marketed as 172 variants.

Measured by its longevity and popularity, the Cessna 172 is the most successful aircraft in history. Cessna delivered the first production model in 1956, and as of 2015, the company and its partners had built more than 44,000 units. With a break from 1986 to 1996, the aircraft remains in production today.

A light general aviation airplane, the Skyhawk's main competitors throughout much of its history were the Beechcraft Musketeer and Grumman American AA-5 series, though neither are currently in production. Other prominent competitors still in production include the Piper PA-28 Cherokee, and, more recently, the Diamond DA40 Diamond Star and Cirrus SR20.

== Design and development ==
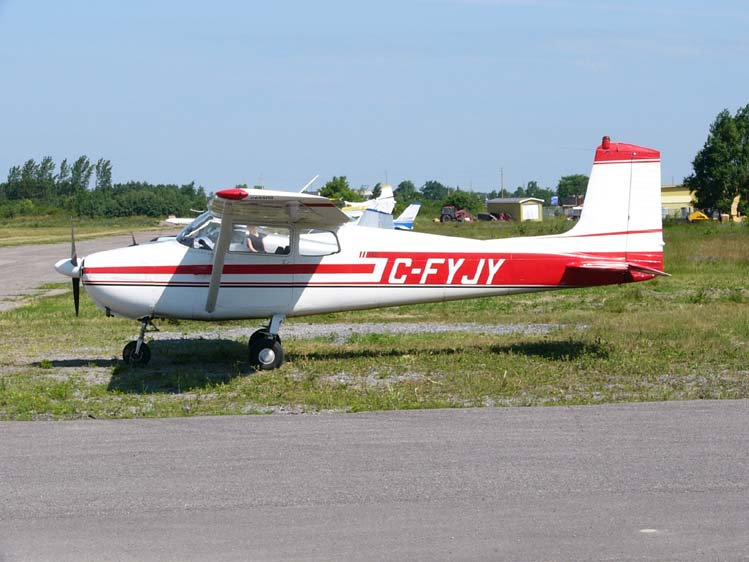
Early Cessna 172s, like this 1957 model, had a "fastback" rear cabin with no rear window and featured a "square" fin design.

The Cessna 172 started as a tricycle landing gear variant of the taildragger Cessna 170, with a basic level of standard equipment. In January 1955, Cessna flew an improved variant of the Cessna 170, a Continental O-300-A-powered Cessna 170C with larger elevators and a more angular tailfin. Although the variant was tested and certified, Cessna decided to modify it with a tricycle landing gear, and the modified Cessna 170C flew again on June 12, 1955. To reduce the time and cost of certification, the type was added to the Cessna 170 type certificate as the Model 172. Later, the 172 was given its own type certificate. The 172 became an overnight sales success, and over 1,400 were built in 1956, its first full year of production.

Early 172s were similar in appearance to the 170s, with the same straight aft fuselage and tall landing gear legs, although the 172 had a straight tailfin while the 170 had a rounded fin and rudder. In 1960, the 172A incorporated revised landing gear and the swept-back tailfin, which is still in use today. Starting with the 172B, Cessna introduced the stepped firewall and enlarged, relocated instrument panel from the related Cessna 175; from this point forward, the fuselages of the two types became largely identical.

The final aesthetic development, found in the 1963 172D and all later 172 models, was a lowered rear deck allowing an aft window. Cessna advertised this added rear visibility as "Omni-Vision".

Production halted in 1986 because of product liability costs, but resumed in 1996 at Cessna's new factory at Independence, Kansas, with the Cessna 172R Skyhawk. Cessna supplemented this in 1998 with the 180 hp (134 kW) Cessna 172S Skyhawk SP.

=== Modifications ===
The Cessna 172 may be modified through a wide array of supplemental type certificates (STCs), including increased engine power, higher gross weight limits, and certain aerobatic conversions. Available STC engine modifications increase power from 180 to 210 hp (134 to 157 kW), add constant-speed propellers, or allow the use of automobile gasoline. Other modifications include additional fuel tank capacity in the wing tips, added baggage compartment tanks, added wheel pants to reduce drag, or enhanced landing and takeoff performance and safety with a STOL kit. The 172 has also been equipped with the 180 hp (134 kW) fuel injected Superior Air Parts Vantage engine.

== Operational history ==
The Cessna 172 has been used extensively for flight training, personal transportation, and aerial patrol work. Various operators, including civil flying schools and government agencies, have flown the type for tasks such as search-and-rescue, pipeline inspection, and law-enforcement observation.

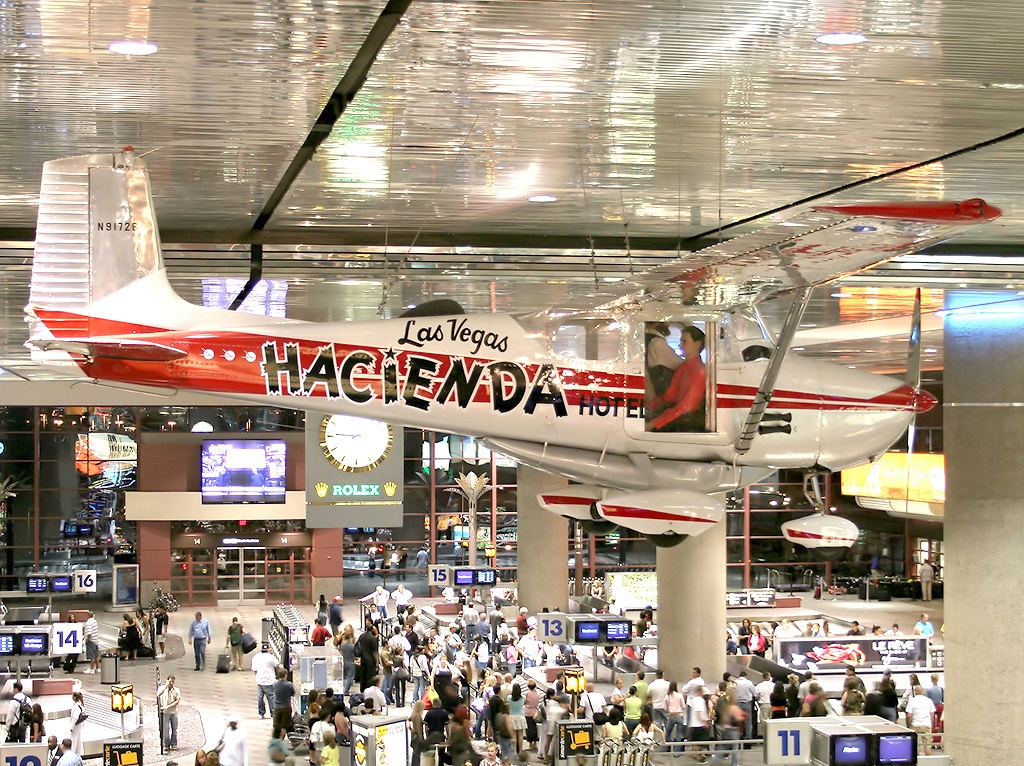
The record-setting 1958-built Cessna 172

=== World records ===
From December 4, 1958, to February 7, 1959, Robert Timm and John Cook set the world record for (refueled) flight endurance in a Cessna 172, registration number N9172B. They took off from McCarran Field (now Harry Reid International Airport) in Las Vegas, Nevada, and landed back at McCarran Field after 64 days, 22 hours, 19 minutes and 5 seconds in a flight covering an estimated 150,000 miles (240,000 km), over 6 times farther than flying around the world at the equator. The flight was part of a fund-raising effort for the Damon Runyon Cancer Fund. The aircraft is now on display at the airport.

== Variants ==
Cessna has historically used model years similar to U.S. auto manufacturers, with sales of new models typically starting a few months prior to the actual calendar year.

172

Introduced in November 1955 for the 1956 model year as a development of the Cessna 170B with tricycle landing gear, dubbed "Land-O-Matic" by Cessna. The 172 also featured a redesigned tail similar to the experimental 170C, "Para-Lift" flaps, and a maximum gross weight of 2,200 lb (998 kg) while retaining the 170B's 145 hp (108 kW) Continental O-300-A six-cylinder, air-cooled engine. The 1957 and 1959 model years brought only minor changes, while 1959 introduced a new cowling for improved engine cooling. The prototype 172, c/n 612, was modified from 170 c/n 27053, which previously served as the prototype of the 170B. A total of 3,757 were constructed over the four model years; 1,178 (1956), 1,041 (1957), 750 (1958), 788 (1959).

172A

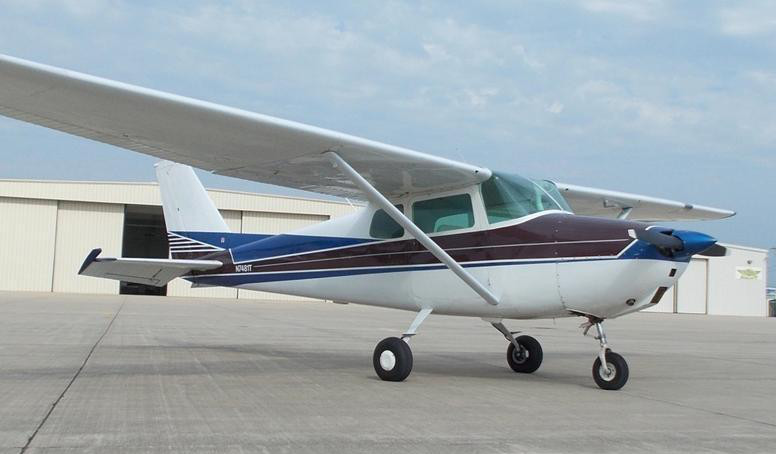
A 1960 Cessna 172A

A 1961 Cessna 172B

1960 model year with a swept-back vertical tail and rudder and powered by a 145 hp (108 kW) O-300-C engine. It was also the first 172 to be certified for floatplane operation. 994 built.

172B

1961 model year with shorter landing gear, engine mounts lengthened by three inches (76 mm), a reshaped cowling, a pointed propeller spinner, and an increased gross weight of 2,250 lb (1,021 kg). The stepped firewall introduced in the closely related Cessna 175 was adopted in the 172, along with the 175's wider, rearranged instrument panel located further aft in the fuselage. For the first time, the Skyhawk name was applied to an available deluxe option package that included optional wheel fairings, avionics, and a cargo door along with full exterior paint rather than partial paint stripes. The Skyhawk was also powered by an O-300-D in place of the O-300-C of the standard model. 989 built.

172C

1962 model year with fiberglass wingtips, redesigned wheel fairings, a key starter to replace the previous pull-starter, and an optional autopilot. The seats were redesigned to be six-way adjustable, and a child seat was made optional to allow two children to be carried in the baggage area. 810 built.

172D

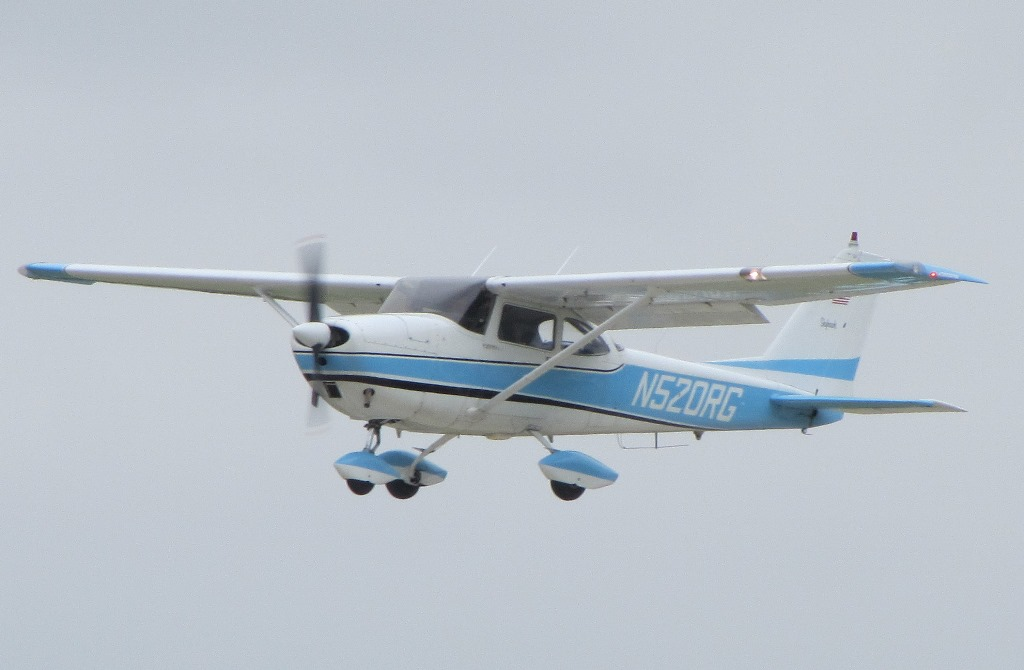
1963 Cessna 172D

1963 model year with a cut down rear fuselage with a wraparound Omni-Vision rear window, a one-piece windshield, increased horizontal stabilizer span, and a folding hat shelf in the rear cabin. Gross weight was increased to 2,300 lb (1,043 kg), where it would stay until the 172P. New rudder and brake pedals were also added. 1,011 were built by Cessna, while a further 18 were produced by Reims Aviation in France as the F172D.

172E

1964 model year with a redesigned instrument panel with center-mounted avionics and circuit breakers replacing the electrical fuses of previous models. 1,209 built, 67 built by Reims as the F172E.

172F

1965 model year with electrically operated flaps to replace the previous lever-operated system and improved instrument lighting. 1,400 built, plus 94 by Reims as the F172F.

The 172F formed the basis for the U.S. Air Force's T-41A Mescalero primary trainer, which was used during the 1960s and early 1970s as initial flight screening aircraft in USAF Undergraduate Pilot Training (UPT). Following their removal from the UPT program, some extant USAF T-41s were assigned to the U.S. Air Force Academy for the cadet pilot indoctrination program, while others were distributed to Air Force aero clubs.

172G

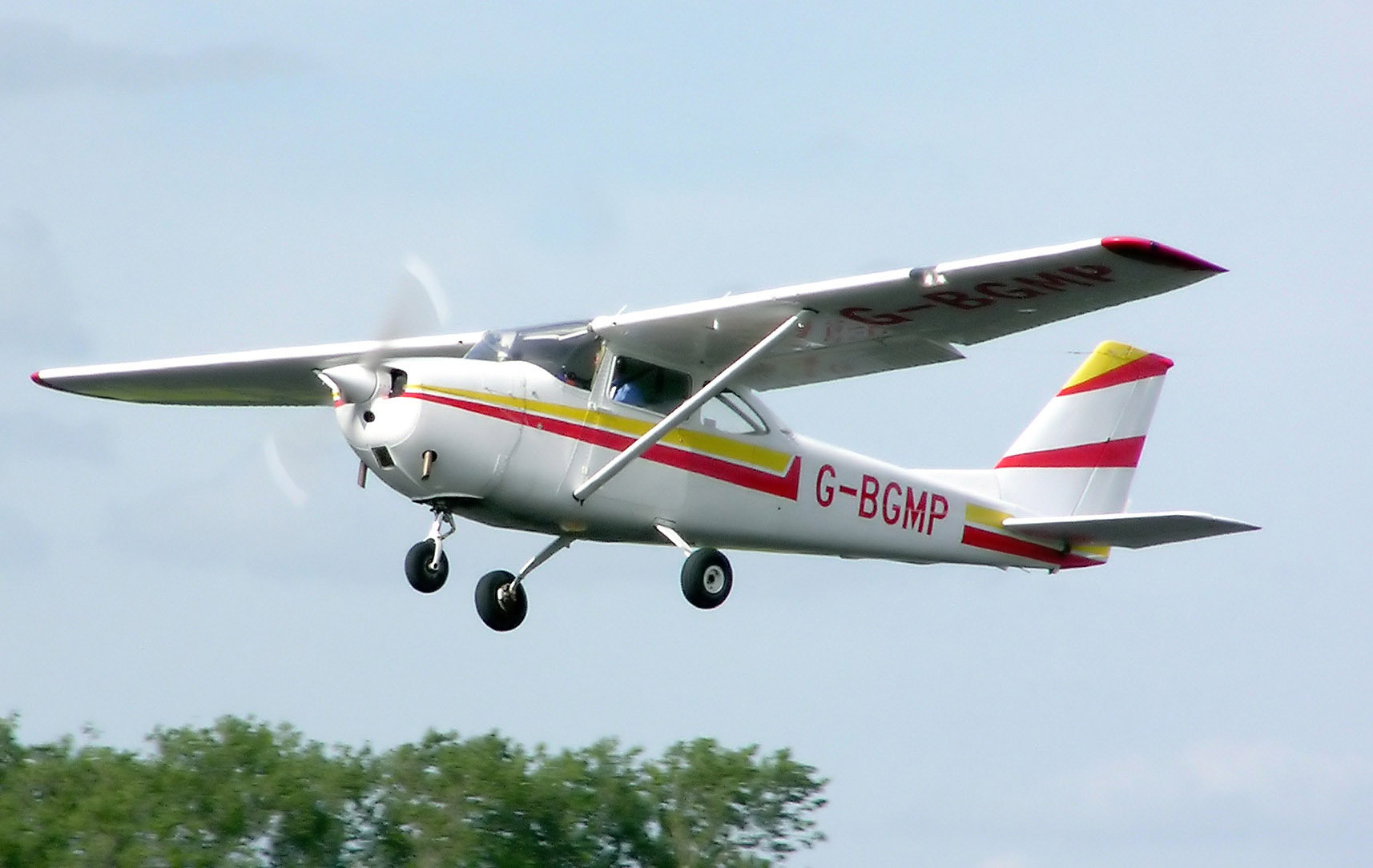
1966 Reims F172G

1966 model year with a longer, more pointed spinner and sold for US$12,450 in its basic 172 version and US$13,300 in the upgraded Skyhawk version. 1,474 built (including 26 as the T-41A), plus 140 by Reims as the F172G.

172H

1967 model year with a 60A alternator replacing the generator, a rotating beacon replacing the flashing unit, redesigned wheel fairings, and a shorter-stroke nose gear oleo to reduce drag and improve the appearance of the aircraft in flight. A new cowling was used, introducing shock-mounts that transmitted lower noise levels to the cockpit and reduced cowl cracking. The electric stall warning horn was replaced by a pneumatic one. 1,586 built (including 34 as the T-41A), plus 435 by Reims as the F172H for both the 1967 and 1968 model years.

172I

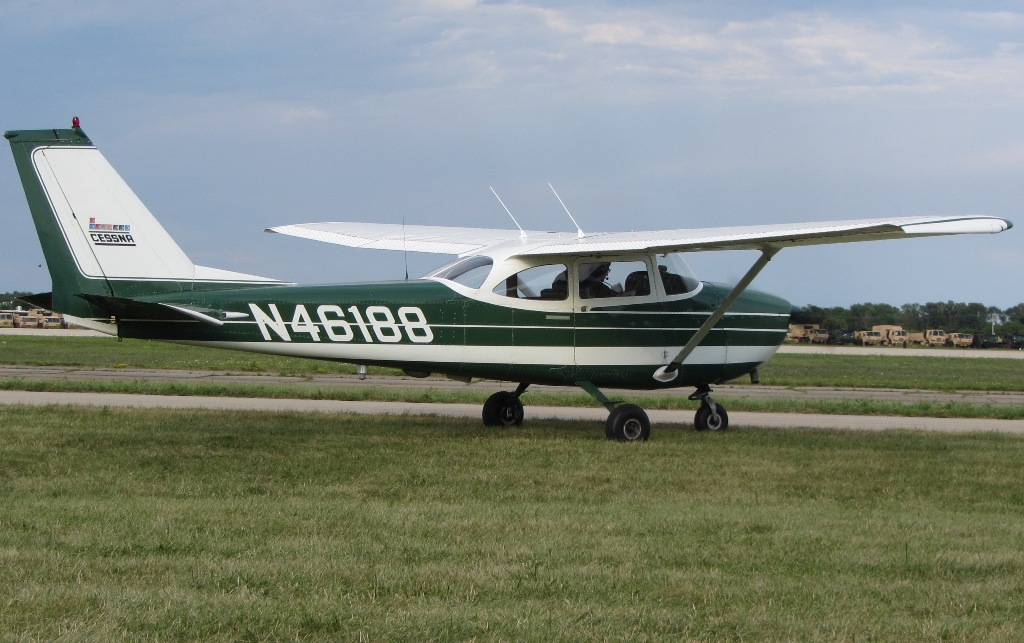
The 1968-built Cessna 172I introduced the Lycoming O-320-E2D engine of 150 hp (112 kW).

The 1968 model year marked the beginning of the Lycoming-powered 172s, with the 172I introduced with a Lycoming O-320-E2D engine of 150 hp (112 kW), an increase of 5 hp (3.7 kW) over the Continental powerplant. The increased power resulted in an increase in optimal cruise from 130 mph (209 km/h) true airspeed (TAS) to 131 mph (211 km/h) TAS. There was no change in the sea level rate of climb at 645 ft (197 m) per minute. Starting with this model, the standard and deluxe Skyhawk models were no longer powered by different engines. The 172I also introduced the first standard "T" instrument arrangement. 649 built.

172J

For 1968, Cessna planned to replace the 172 with a newly designed aircraft called the 172J, featuring the same general configuration but with a more sloping windshield, a strutless cantilever wing, a more stylish interior, and various other improvements. A single 172J prototype, registered N3765C (c/n 660), was built. However, the popularity of the previous 172 with Cessna dealers and flight schools prompted the cancellation of the replacement plan, and the 172J was redesignated as the 177 from the second prototype onward and sold alongside the 172.

172K

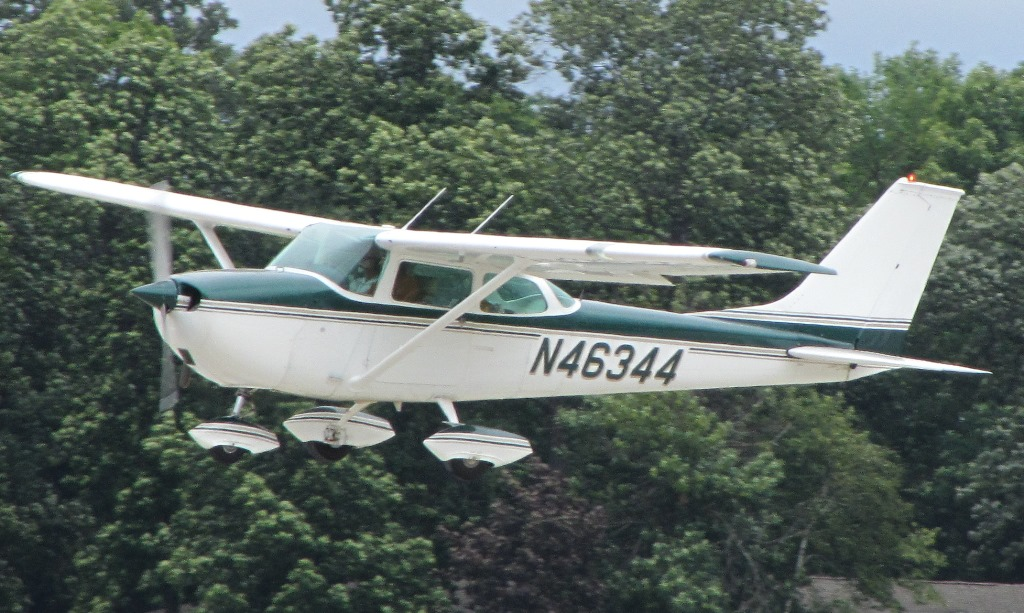
1969 model-year Cessna 172K, built in 1968

Introduced for the 1969 model year with a redesigned tailfin cap and reshaped rear windows enlarged by 16 square inches (103 cm^{2}). Optional long-range 52 US gal (43 imp gal; 197 L) wing fuel tanks were also offered. The 1970 model year featured fiberglass, downward-shaped, conical camber wingtips and optional fully articulated seats. 2,055 built for both model years, plus 50 by Reims as the F172K.

172L

Introduced for the 1971 model year with tapered, tubular steel landing gear legs replacing the original flat spring steel legs, increasing landing gear width by 12 in (30 cm). The new landing gear was lighter, but required aerodynamic fairings to maintain the same speed and climb performance as experienced with the flat steel design. 172L also had a nose-mounted landing light, a bonded baggage door, and optional cabin skylights. The 1972 model year introduced a plastic fairing between the dorsal fin and vertical fin to introduce a greater family resemblance to the 182's vertical fin. 1972 also introduced a reduced-diameter propeller, bonded cabin doors, and improved instrument panel controls. 1,535 built for both model years, plus 100 by Reims as the F172L.

172M

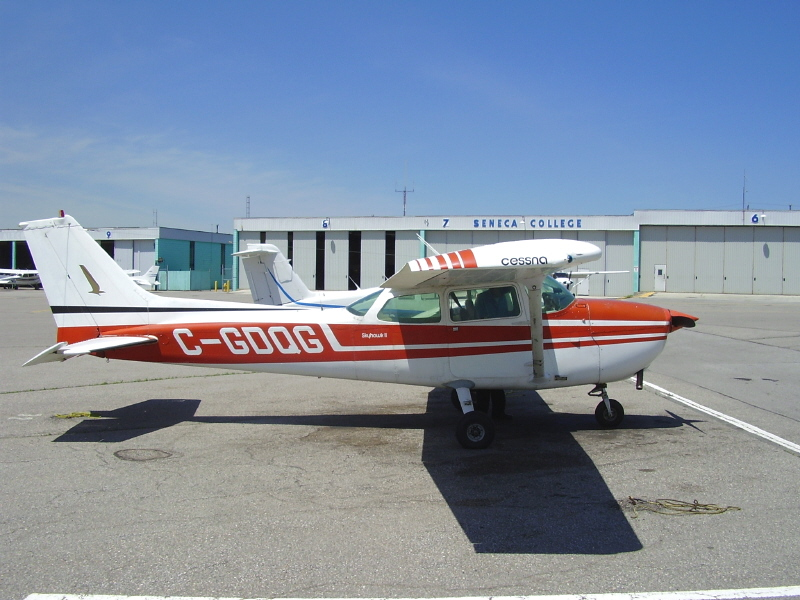
1975 Cessna 172M

Introduced for the 1973 model year with a "Camber-Lift" wing with a drooped leading edge for improved low-speed handling, a key-locking baggage door, and new lighting switches. The 1974 model year introduced the Skyhawk II, which was sold alongside the baseline 172M and Skyhawk models with higher standard equipment, including a second nav/comm radio, an ADF and transponder, a larger baggage compartment, and nose-mounted dual landing lights. 1975 introduced inertia-reel shoulder harnesses and an improved instrument panel and door seals. Beginning in 1976, Cessna stopped marketing the aircraft as the 172 and began exclusively using the "Skyhawk" designation. This model year also saw a redesigned instrument panel to hold more avionics. Among other changes, the fuel and other small gauges were relocated to the left side for improved pilot readability compared with the earlier 172 panel designs. 6,826 built; 4,926 (1973–75) and 1,900 (1976), plus 610 by Reims as the F172M.

172N Skyhawk/100

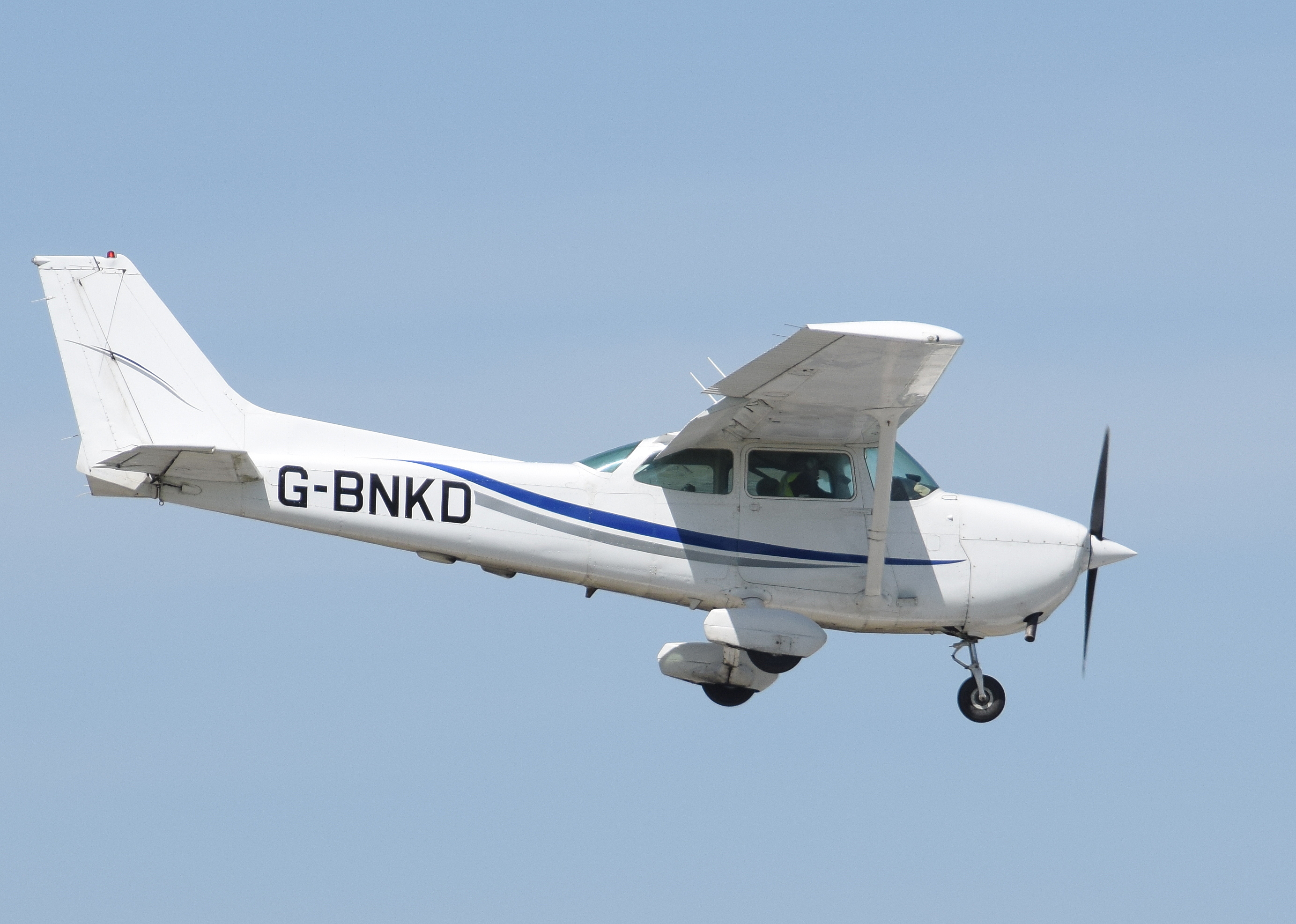
1979 Cessna 172N

1977 model year powered by a 160 horsepower (119 kW) Lycoming O-320-H2AD engine designed to run on 100-octane fuel (hence the "Skyhawk/100" name), whereas all previous engines used 80/87 fuel. Other changes included pre-select flap control and optional rudder trim. The 1978 model year brought a 28-volt electrical system to replace the previous 14-volt system as well as optional air conditioning. The 1979 model year increased the flap-extension speed to 110 knots (127 mph; 204 km/h). 6,425 total built; 1,725 (1977), 1,725 (1978), 1,850 (1979), and 1,125 (1980), plus 525 by Reims as the F172N.

172O

There was no "O" model 172, to avoid confusion with the number zero.

172P Skyhawk P

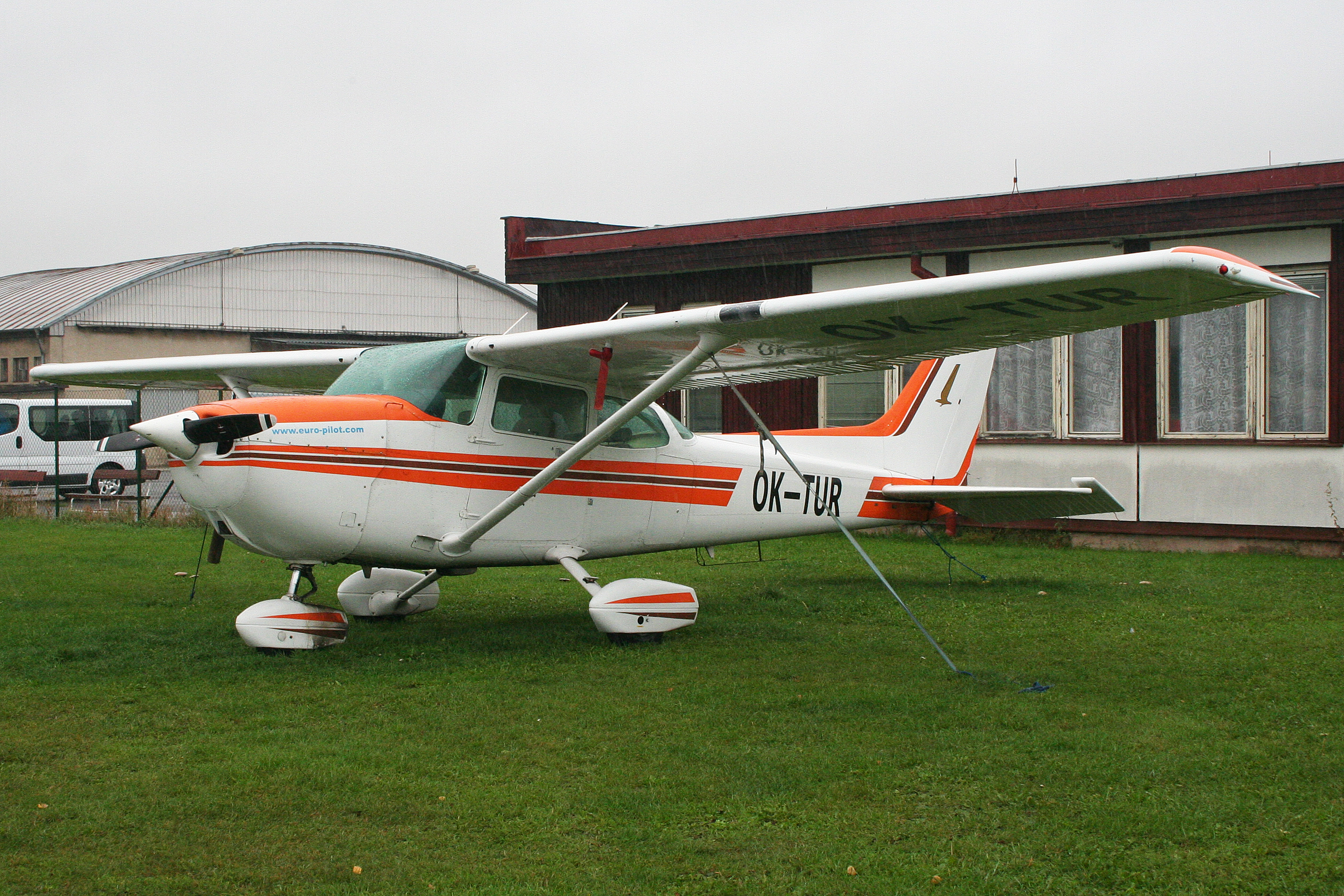
Cessna 172P

Introduced for the 1981 model year with a Lycoming O-320-D2J engine replacing the O-320-H2AD of the 172N, which had proven unreliable. Other changes included a decreased maximum flap deflection from 40 degrees to 30 to allow a gross weight increase from 2,300 lb (1,043 kg) to 2,400 lb (1,089 kg). A 62 US gal (235 L) wet wing and air conditioning were optional. The 1982 model year moved the landing lights from the nose to the wing to increase bulb life, while 1983 added some minor soundproofing improvements and thicker windows. 1984 introduced a second door latch pin, a thicker windshield and side windows, additional avionics capacity, and low-vacuum warning lights. 2,664 total built; 1,052 (1981), 724 (1982), 319 (1983), 179 (1984), 256 (1985), and 134 (1986), plus 215 by Reims as the F172P. Following the end of 172P production in 1986, Cessna ceased production of the Skyhawk for ten years.

172Q Cutlass

Introduced for the 1983 model year, the 172Q was given the name "Cutlass" to create an affiliation with the 172RG Cutlass RG, although it was actually a 172P with a Lycoming O-360-A4N engine of 180 horsepower (134 kW). The aircraft had a gross weight of 2,550 lb (1,157 kg) and an optimal cruise speed of 122 knots (140 mph; 226 km/h) compared to the 172P's cruise speed of 120 knots (138 mph; 222 km/h) on 20 hp (15 kW) less. It had a useful load that was about 100 lb (45 kg) more than the Skyhawk P and a rate of climb that was actually 20 feet (6 m) per minute lower, due to the higher gross weight. The Cutlass II was offered as a deluxe model of the 172Q, as was the Cutlass II/Nav-Pac with IFR equipment. The 172Q was produced alongside the 172P for the 1983 and 1984 model years before being discontinued. Sources disagree on the exact number of 172Q aircraft built, (Note: Different production figures for the 172Q Cutlass include 389 (210 in 1983 and 179 in 1984) and 391, while the Federal Aviation Administration type certificate lists 297 (186 in 1983 and 111 in 1984) construction numbers which overlap with those of the 172P Skyhawk P.) and the construction numbers listed on the Federal Aviation Administration type certificate overlap with those of the 1983 and 1984 172P.

172R Skyhawk R

The Skyhawk R was introduced in 1996 and is powered by a derated Lycoming IO-360-L2A producing a maximum of 160 horsepower (120 kW) at just 2,400 rpm. This is the first Cessna 172 to have a factory-fitted fuel-injected engine.

The 172R's maximum takeoff weight is 2,450 lb (1,111 kg). This model year introduced many improvements, including a new interior with soundproofing, an all new multi-level ventilation system, a standard four point intercom, contoured, energy absorbing, 26g front seats with vertical and reclining adjustments and inertia reel harnesses.

172S Skyhawk SP

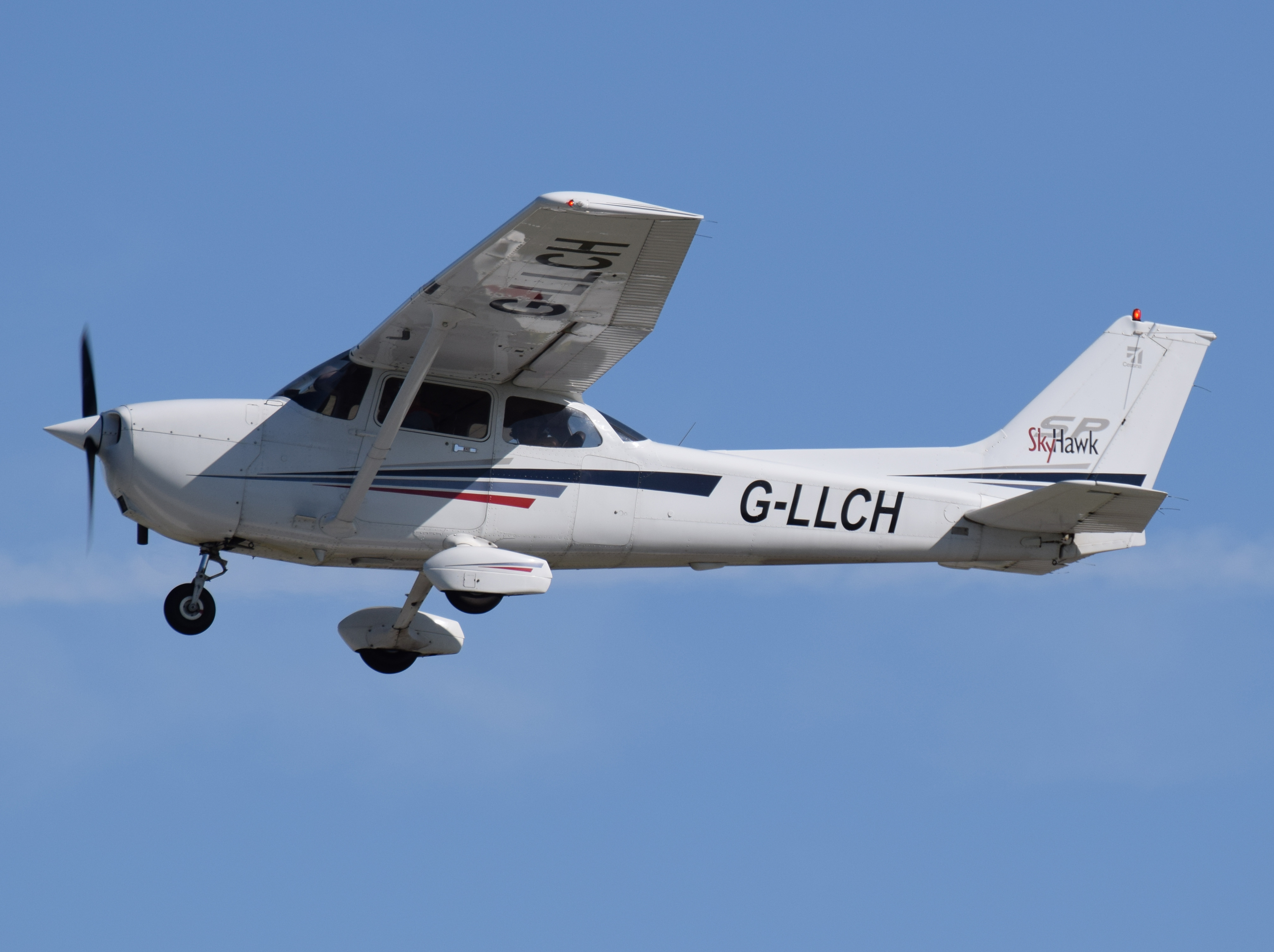
Cessna 172S Skyhawk SP

The Cessna 172S was introduced in 1998 and is powered by a Lycoming IO-360-L2A producing 180 horsepower (134 kW). The maximum engine rpm was increased from 2,400 rpm to 2,700 rpm resulting in a 20 hp (15 kW) increase over the "R" model. As a result, the maximum takeoff weight was increased to 2,550 lb (1,157 kg). This model is marketed under the name Skyhawk SP, although the Type Certification data sheet specifies it is a 172S.

The 172S was built primarily for the private owner-operator and is, in the early 2000s, was offered with the Garmin G1000 avionics package and leather seats as standard equipment.

As of 2009, the 172S model was the only Skyhawk model in production.

As of 2026, the 172S remains in production, with a variety of interiors suited to private owner-pilots and flight schools.

=== Special versions ===
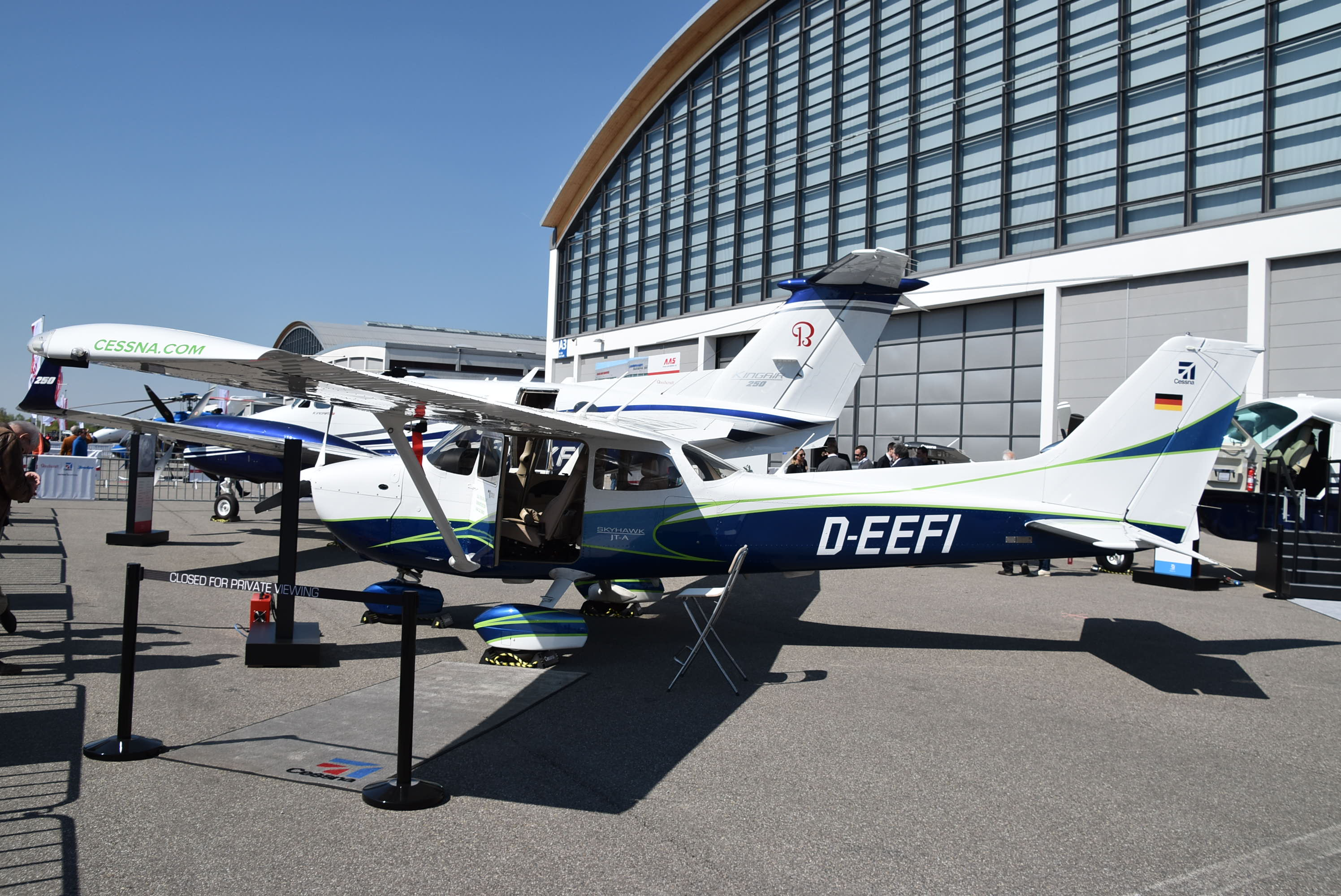
Cessna J172T displayed at AERO Friedrichshafen 2016

J172T Turbo Skyhawk JT-A

Model introduced in July 2014 for 2015 customer deliveries, powered by a 155 hp (116 kW) Continental CD-155 diesel engine installed by the factory under a supplemental type certificate. Initial retail price in 2014 was $435,000 (~$581,895 in 2025). The model has a top speed of 131 kn (243 km/h; 151 mph) and burns 3 U.S. gallons (11 L; 2.5 imp gal) per hour less fuel than the standard 172. As a result, the model has an 885 nmi (1,639 km; 1,018 mi) range, an increase of more than 38% over the standard 172. This model is a development of the proposed and then canceled Skyhawk TD. Cessna has indicated that the JT-A will be made available in 2016.

In reviewing this new model Paul Bertorelli of AVweb said: "I'm sure Cessna will find some sales for the Skyhawk JT-A, but at $420,000, it's hard to see how it will ignite much market expansion just because it's a Cessna. It gives away $170,000 to the near-new Redbird Redhawk conversion which is a lot of change to pay merely for the smell of a new airplane. Diesel engines cost more than twice as much to manufacture as gasoline engines do and although their fuel efficiency gains back some of that investment, if the complete aircraft package is too pricey, the debt service will eat up any savings, making a new aircraft not just unattractive, but unaffordable. I haven't run the numbers on the JT-A yet, but I can tell from previous analysis that there are definite limits."

The model was certified by both EASA and the FAA in June 2017. It was discontinued in May 2018, due to poor sales as a result of the aircraft's high price, which was twice the price of the same aircraft as a diesel conversion. The aircraft remains available as an STC conversion from Continental Motors, Inc.

Electric-powered 172

In July 2010, Cessna announced it was developing an electrically powered 172 as a proof-of-concept in partnership with Bye Energy. In July 2011, Bye Energy, whose name had been changed to Beyond Aviation, announced the prototype had commenced taxi tests on 22 July 2011 and a first flight would follow soon. In 2012, the prototype, using Panacis batteries, engaged in multiple successful test flights. The R&D project was not pursued for production.

=== Canceled model ===
172TD Skyhawk TD

On October 4, 2007, Cessna announced its plan to build a diesel-powered model, to be designated the 172 Skyhawk TD ("Turbo Diesel") starting in mid-2008. The planned engine was to be a Thielert Centurion 2.0, liquid-cooled, two-liter displacement, dual overhead cam, four-cylinder, in-line, turbo-diesel with full authority digital engine control with an output of 155 hp (116 kW) and burning Jet-A fuel. In July 2013, the 172TD model was canceled due to Thielert's bankruptcy. The aircraft was later refined into the Turbo Skyhawk JT-A, which was certified in June 2014 and discontinued in May 2018.

Simulator company Redbird Flight uses the same engine and reconditioned 172 airframes to produce a similar model, the Redbird Redhawk.

Premier Aircraft Sales also announced in February 2014 that it would offer refurbished 172 airframes equipped with the Continental/Thielert Centurion 2.0 diesel engine.

== Military operators ==
A variant of the 172, the T-41 Mescalero was used as a trainer with the United States Air Force and Army. In addition, the United States Border Patrol uses a fleet of 172s for aerial surveillance along the Mexico-US border.

From 1972 to 2019 the Irish Air Corps used the Reims version for aerial surveillance and monitoring of cash, prisoner and explosive escorts, in addition to army cooperation and pilot training roles.

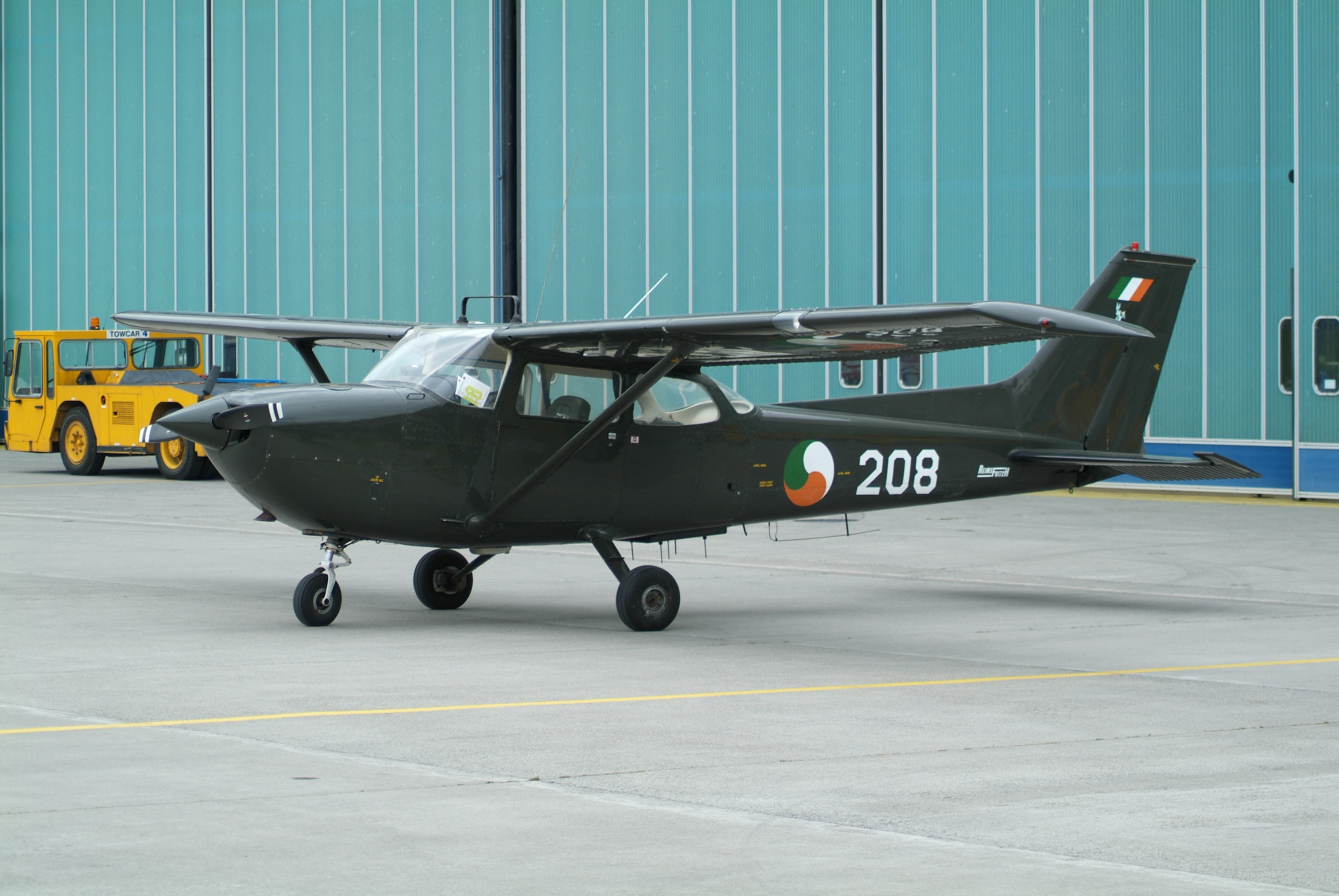
Irish Air Corps Reims FR.172H Rocket

For T-41 operators, see Cessna T-41 Mescalero.

Angola

- FAPA/DAA

Bolivia

- Bolivian Air Force 3× 172K

Colombia

- Colombian Air Force – To replace Cessna T-41s used for primary training with deliveries from June 2021.

Ecuador

- Ecuadorian Air Force 8× 172F
- Ecuadorian Army 1× 172G

Guatemala

- Guatemalan Air Force 6× 172K

Honduras

- Honduran Air Force 3

Indonesia

- Indonesian Air Force Academy

Iraq

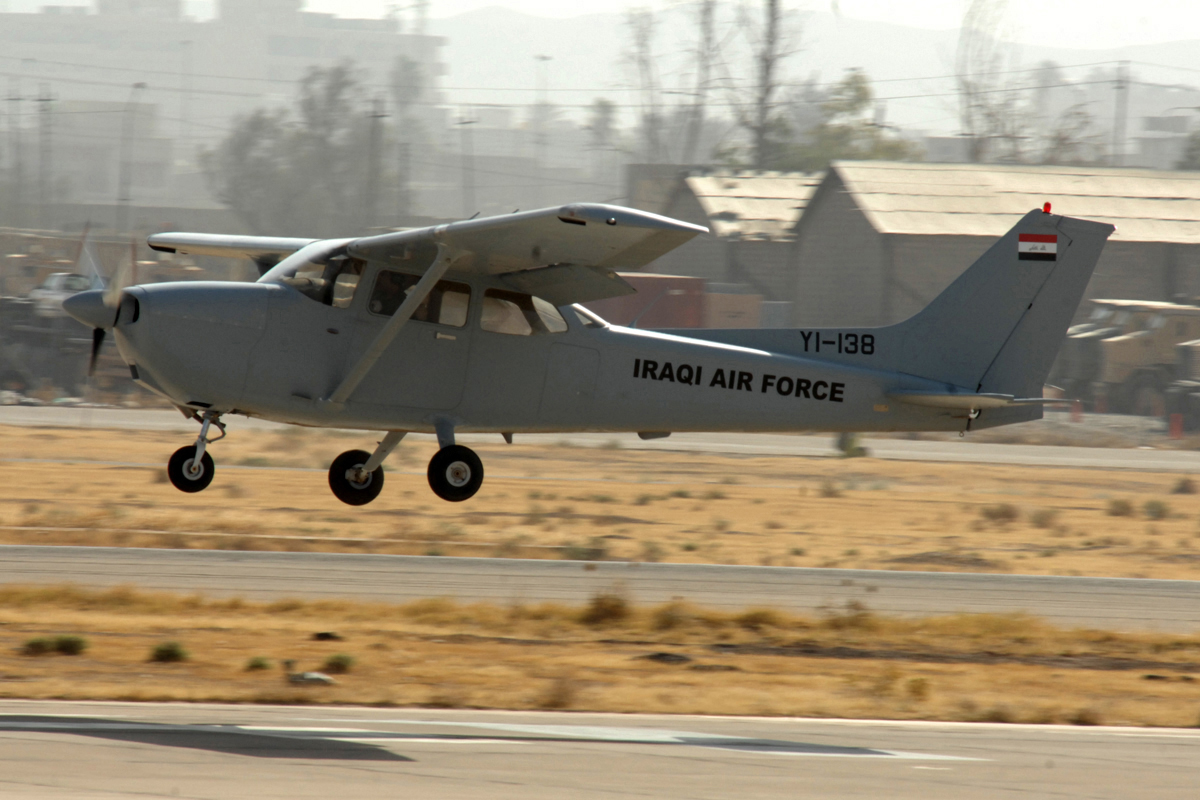
Iraqi Air Force Cessna 172 lands at Kirkuk Air Base.

- Iraqi Air Force

Liberia

- Air Reconnaissance Unit 2

Lithuania

- Lithuanian Air Force 1

Madagascar

- Malagasy Air Force 4× 172M

Nicaragua

- Nicaraguan Air Force 7

Pakistan

- Pakistan Air Force 4× 172N

Philippines

- Philippine Navy - 1×172F - Donated By Olympic Aviation in 2007 as PN 330. 1×172N - Purchased from Welcome Export Inc. in July 2008 as PN 331, 4x172S- acquired from US Foreign Military Sales delivered in February 2022

Saudi Arabia

- Royal Saudi Air Force 8× F172G, 4× F172H, 4× F172M

Singapore

- Republic of Singapore Air Force 8× 172K, delivered 1969 and retired 1972.

Suriname

- Suriname Air Force (One in service for sale)

Timor-Leste

- Timor-Leste Defence Force Light Air Component

== Accidents and incidents ==
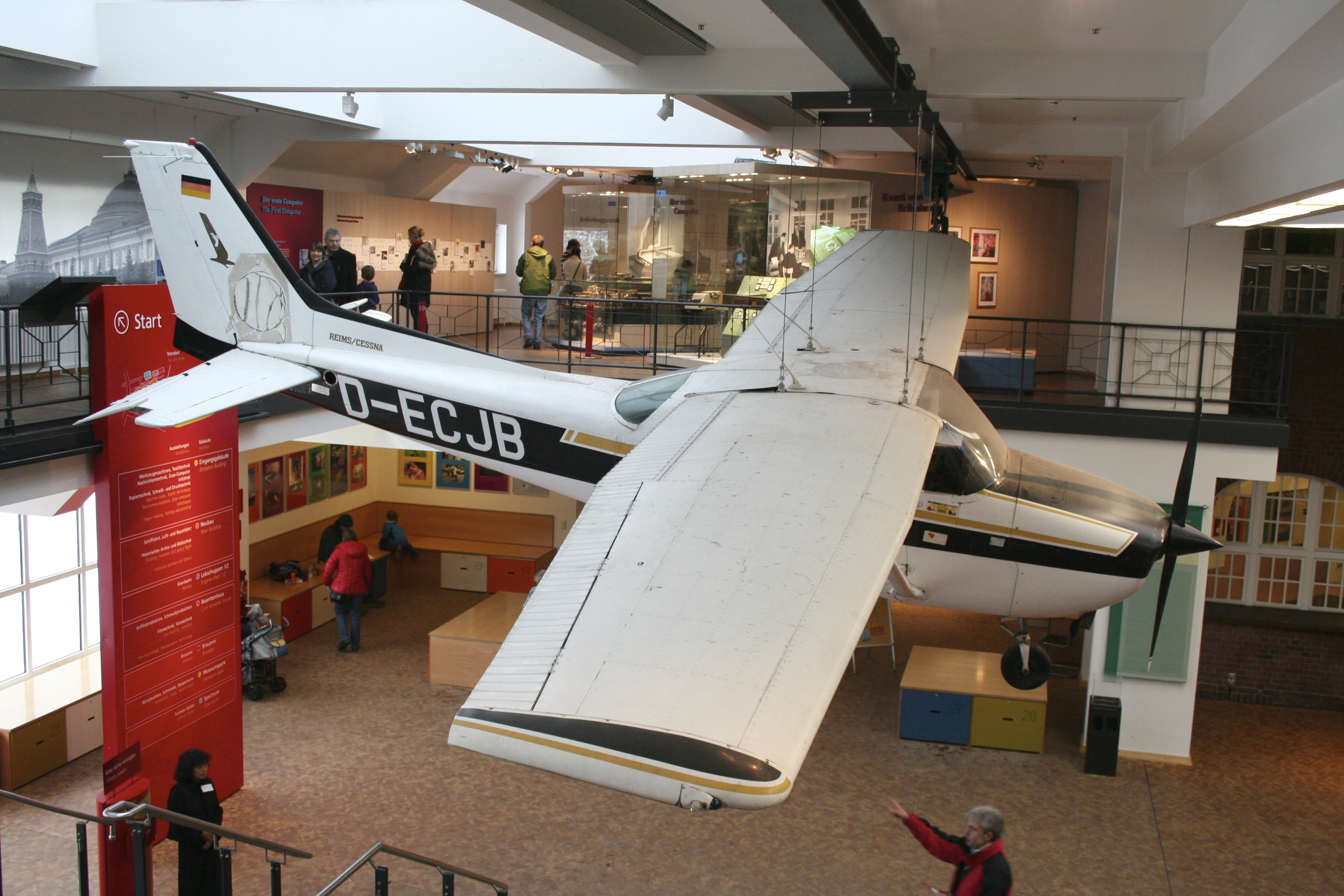
Mathias Rust's Cessna F172P, used in his flight from Helsinki to Moscow, on display at the German Museum of Technology, Berlin

- On February 13, 1964, Ken Hubbs, second baseman for the Chicago Cubs and winner of the Rookie of the Year Award and the Gold Glove Award, was killed when the Cessna 172 he was flying crashed near Bird Island in Utah Lake.
- On October 23, 1964, David Box, lead singer for The Crickets on their 1960 release version of "Peggy Sue Got Married" and "Don't Cha Know" and later a solo artist, was killed when the Cessna 172 he was aboard crashed in northwest Harris County, Texas, while en route to a performance. Box was the second lead vocalist for The Crickets to die in a plane crash, following Buddy Holly.
- On August 31, 1969, American professional boxer Rocky Marciano was killed when the Cessna 172 in which he was a passenger crashed on approach to an airfield outside Newton, Iowa.
- On September 25, 1978, a Cessna 172, N7711G, and Pacific Southwest Airlines Flight 182, a Boeing 727, collided over San Diego, California. There were 144 fatalities, 2 in the Cessna 172, 135 on the PSA Flight 182 and 7 on the ground.
- On May 28, 1987, a rented Reims Cessna F172P, registered D-ECJB, was used by German teenage pilot Mathias Rust in an unauthorized flight from Helsinki-Malmi Airport through Soviet airspace to land near the Red Square in Moscow without being intercepted by Soviet air defense.
- On April 9, 1990, Atlantic Southeast Airlines Flight 2254, an Embraer EMB 120 Brasilia, collided head-on with a Civil Air Patrol Cessna 172, N99501, while en route from Gadsden Municipal Airport to Hartsfield–Jackson Atlanta International Airport. The Cessna crashed, killing two occupants, but the Brasilia made a safe emergency landing.
- On January 5, 2002, high school student Charles J. Bishop stole a Cessna 172, N2371N, and intentionally crashed it into the side of the Bank of America Tower in downtown Tampa, Florida, killing only himself and otherwise causing very little damage.
- On April 6, 2009, a Cessna 172N, C-GFJH, belonging to Confederation College in Thunder Bay, Ontario, Canada, was stolen by a student who flew it into United States airspace over Lake Superior. The 172 was intercepted and followed by NORAD F-16s, finally landing on Highway 60 in Ellsinore, Missouri, after a seven-hour flight. The student pilot, a Canadian citizen born in Turkey, Adam Dylan Leon, formerly known as Yavuz Berke, suffered from depression and was attempting to commit suicide by being shot down, but was instead arrested shortly after landing. On November 3, 2009, he was sentenced to two years in a US federal prison after pleading guilty to all three charges against him: interstate transportation of a stolen aircraft, importation of a stolen aircraft, and illegal entry into the US. College procedures at the time allowed easy access to aircraft and keys were routinely left in them.
- On August 16, 2015, Cessna 172M N1285U collided in midair with a private North American Sabreliner, N442RM, on approach to Brown Field Municipal Airport in California, killing all five people on board the two aircraft. The cause was found to be air traffic control error. This accident, together with another fatal 2015 mid-air collision under similar circumstances, prompted the U.S. National Transportation Safety Board to recommend that the FAA more strongly emphasize scenario-based training for controllers.
- On November 11, 2021, Glen de Vries, co-founder of Medidata Solutions and Blue Origin space tourist, died in the crash of a 172 near Hampton Township, New Jersey.
- On March 5, 2024, a 172M of 99 Flying School, 5Y-NNJ, crashed after colliding with Safarilink Aviation Flight 053, a de Havilland Canada Dash 8, near Wilson Airport over Nairobi National Park, killing the instructor and student pilot aboard the 172. The Safarilink flight landed safely with no injuries to the 44 people on board.

== Specifications (172R) ==
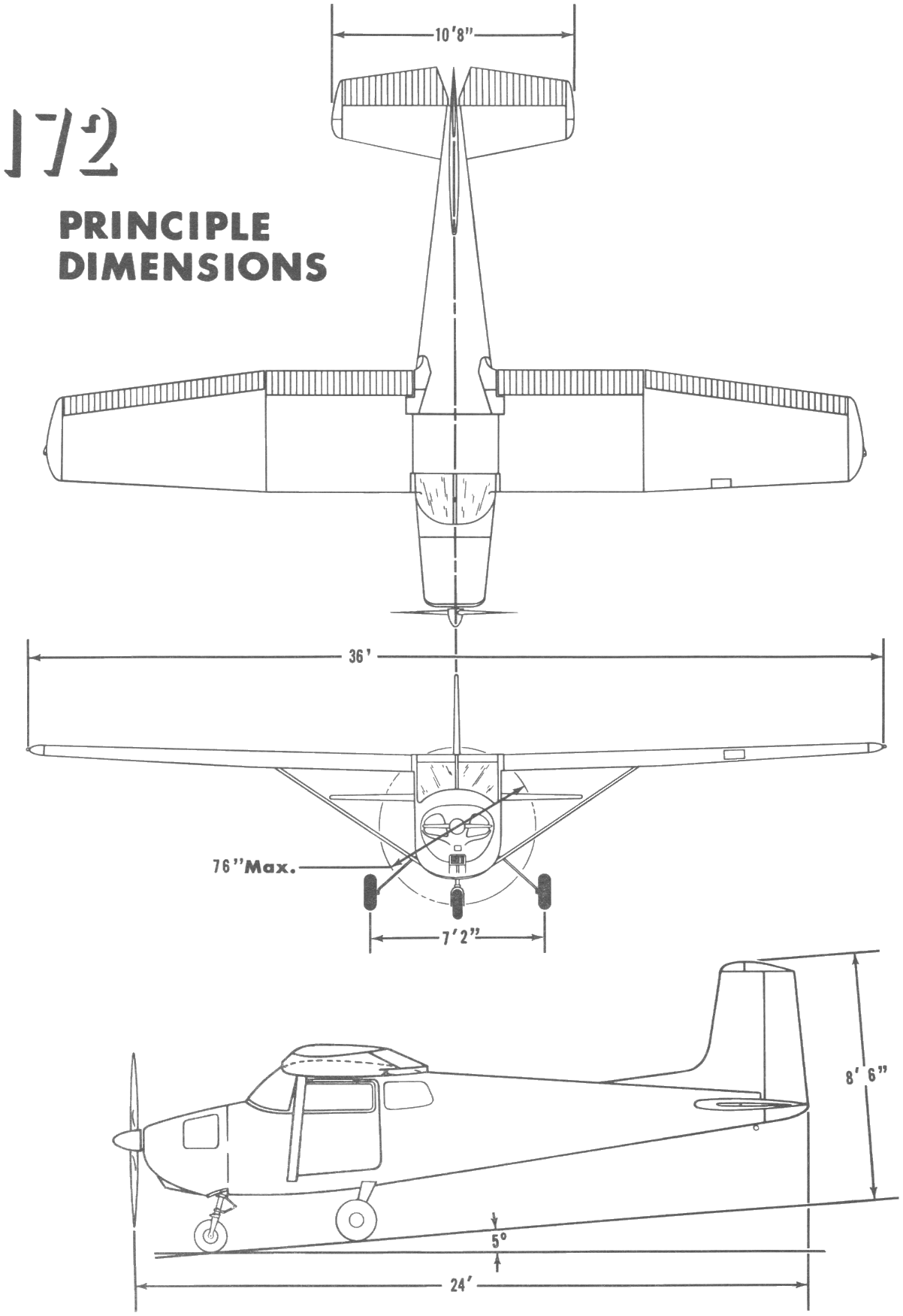
3-view line drawing of the base model Cessna 172

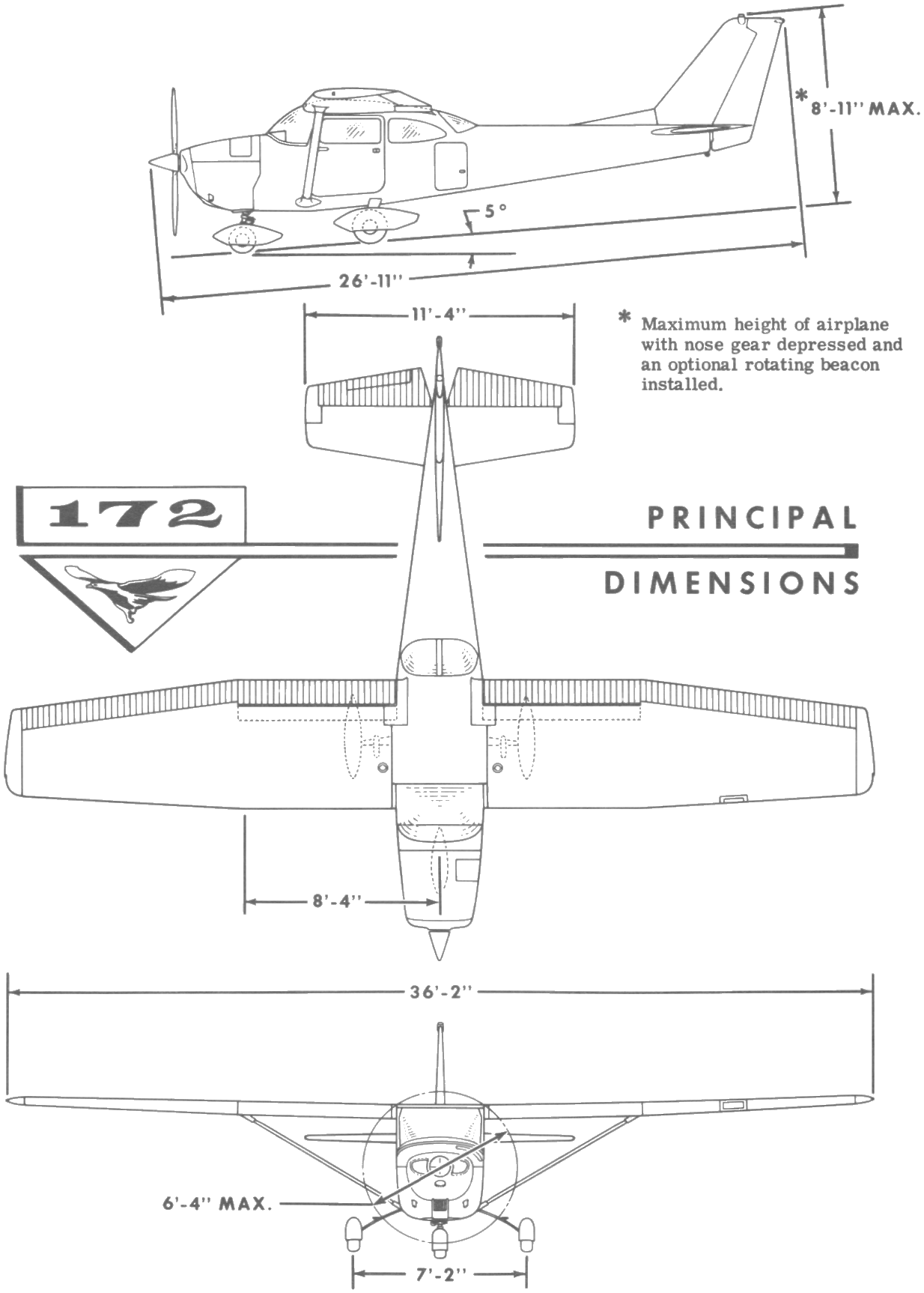
3-view line drawing of the Cessna 172G Skyhawk

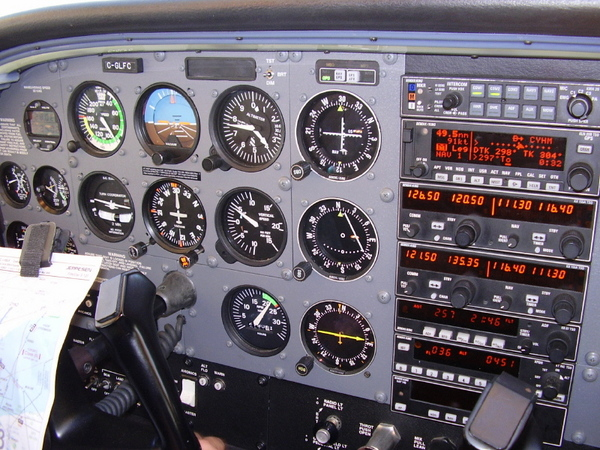
Cessna 172R instrument panel

Data from Cessna, FAA type certificate

General characteristics

- Crew: one
- Capacity: three passengers, 120 lb (54 kg) of baggage
- Length: 27 ft 2 in (8.28 m)
- Wingspan: 36 ft 1 in (11.00 m)
- Height: 8 ft 11 in (2.72 m)
- Wing area: 174 sq ft (16.2 m^{2})
- Aspect ratio: 7.32
- Airfoil: modified NACA 2412
- Empty weight: 1,691 lb (767 kg)
- Gross weight: 2,450 lb (1,111 kg)
- Fuel capacity: 56 US gal (210 L) (52 US gal (200 L) usable)
- Powerplant: 1 × Lycoming IO-360-L2A four cylinder, horizontally opposed aircraft engine, 160 hp (120 kW)
- Propellers: 2-bladed metal, fixed pitch McCauley Model 1C235/LFA7570, 6 ft 3 in (1.91 m) diameter (maximum)

Performance

- Cruise speed: 122 kn (140 mph, 226 km/h)
- Stall speed: 47 kn (54 mph, 87 km/h) (power off, flaps down)
- Never exceed speed: 163 kn (188 mph, 302 km/h) (IAS)
- Range: 696 nmi (801 mi, 1,289 km) with 45 minute reserve, 55% power, at 12,000 feet (3,700 m)
- Service ceiling: 13,500 ft (4,100 m)
- Rate of climb: 721 ft/min (3.66 m/s)
- Wing loading: 14.1 lb/sq ft (68.6 kg/m^{2})

Avionics

- Optional Garmin G1000 primary flight display

== See also ==
- 1955 in aviation (first flight)
- Dwane Wallace

Related development

- Cessna 150
- Cessna 152
- Cessna 170
- Cessna R172
- Cessna 175 Skylark
- Cessna 177 Cardinal
- Cessna T-41 Mescalero

Aircraft of comparable role, configuration, and era

- Aero Commander 100
- Beechcraft Musketeer
- Diamond DA40
- Grumman Cheetah
- Piper Cherokee
- Vulcanair V1.0
- Yak-12

Related lists

- List of aircraft
- List of civil aircraft
- List of most produced aircraft
