= Northeast Alabama Regional Airport =

Airport in Etowah County, Alabama

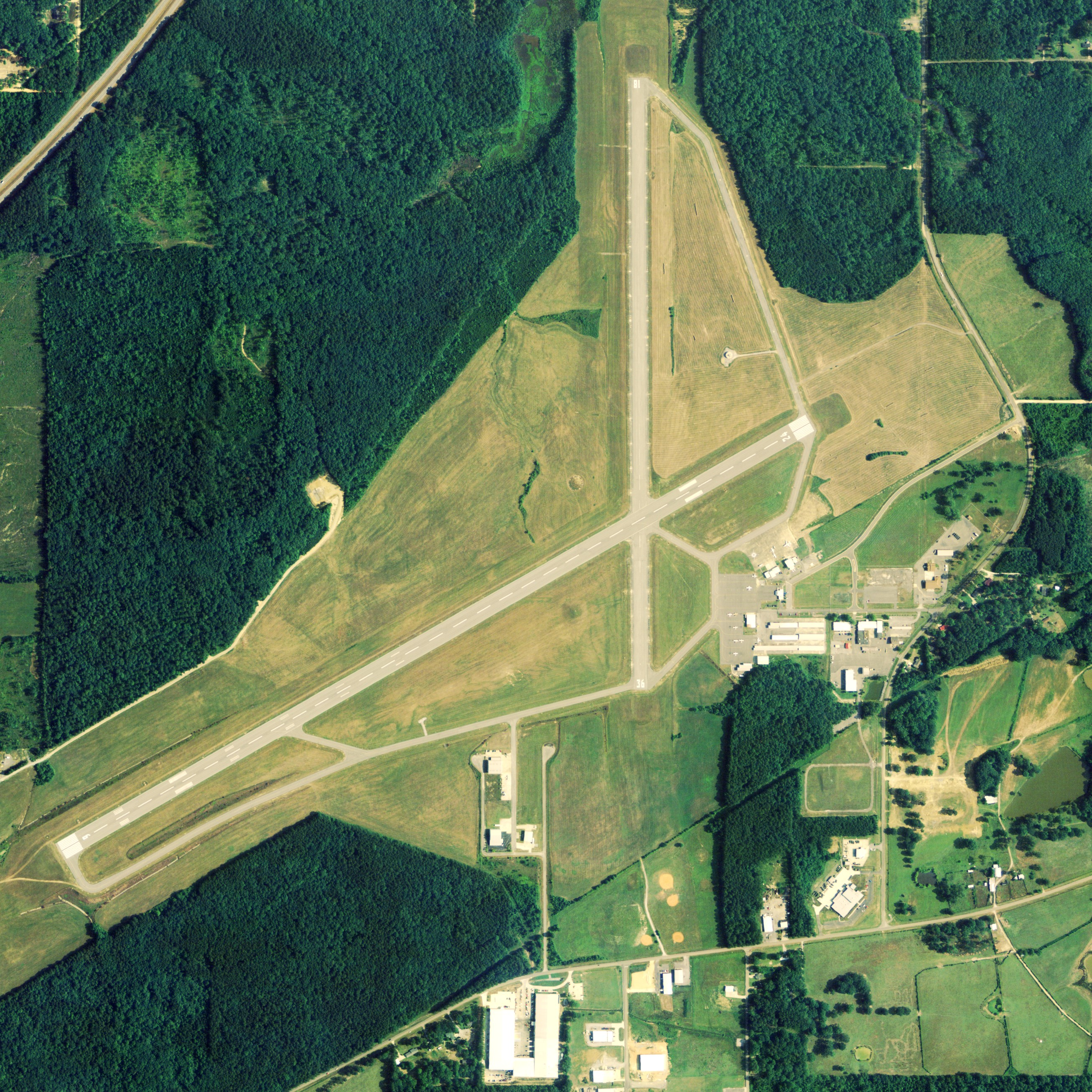
- NAIP image, 2006
- IATA: GAD; ICAO: KGAD; FAA LID: GAD

Summary
- Airport type: Public
- Owner: Gadsden Airport Authority
- Serves: Gadsden, Alabama
- Elevation AMSL: 569 ft (173 m)
- Coordinates: 33°58′22″N 086°05′21″W
- Website: http://www.gadsdenairport.com/
- Interactive map of Northeast Alabama Regional Airport

Runways
Direction	Length		Surface
Direction	ft	m	Surface
6/24	6,802	2,073	Asphalt
18/36	4,806	1,465	Asphalt

Statistics (2020)
- Aircraft operations (year ending 7/31/2020): 23,886
- Based aircraft: 36
- Source: Federal Aviation Administration

Northeast Alabama Regional Airport (IATA: GAD, ICAO: KGAD, FAA LID: GAD) is in Gadsden, Etowah County, Alabama, 5 miles (8.0 km) southwest of the city center. It is owned by Gadsden Airport Authority and it used to be Gadsden Municipal Airport. The FAA's National Plan of Integrated Airport Systems for 2009–2013 categorized as a general aviation facility.

== Facilities ==
The airport covers 1,480 acres (600 ha) at an elevation of 569 feet (173 m). It has two asphalt runways: 6/24 is 6,802 by 150 feet (2,073 x 46 m) and 18/36 is 4,806 by 150 feet (1,465 x 46 m).

In the year ending July 31, 2020 the airport had 23,886 aircraft operations, average 65 per day: 93% general aviation, 5% air taxi and 2% military. 36 aircraft were then based at this airport: 26 single-engine, 6 multi-engine, 3 jet, and 1 helicopter.

== Former airlines ==
- Air New Orleans - mid-1980s
- Atlantic Southeast Airlines - early 1990s
- Southern Airways

The first airline flights were Southern Airways DC-3s in 1949; successor Republic pulled out its Convair 580s in 1981.

== Incidents and accidents ==
- On April 9, 1990, a Delta Connection flight operated by Atlantic Southeast Airlines Embraer EMB-120 (Registration N217AS) as Flight 2254, en route to William B. Hartsfield Atlanta International Airport struck a Cessna 172 just after take-off. The Embraer was able to land, but the Cessna was unable to regain control and crashed. Of the seven on the Embraer, there were zero fatalities; the two on board the Cessna were killed.

== See also ==
- List of airports in Alabama
