= Northwest Florida Beaches International Airport =

Airport serving Panama City, Florida, United States

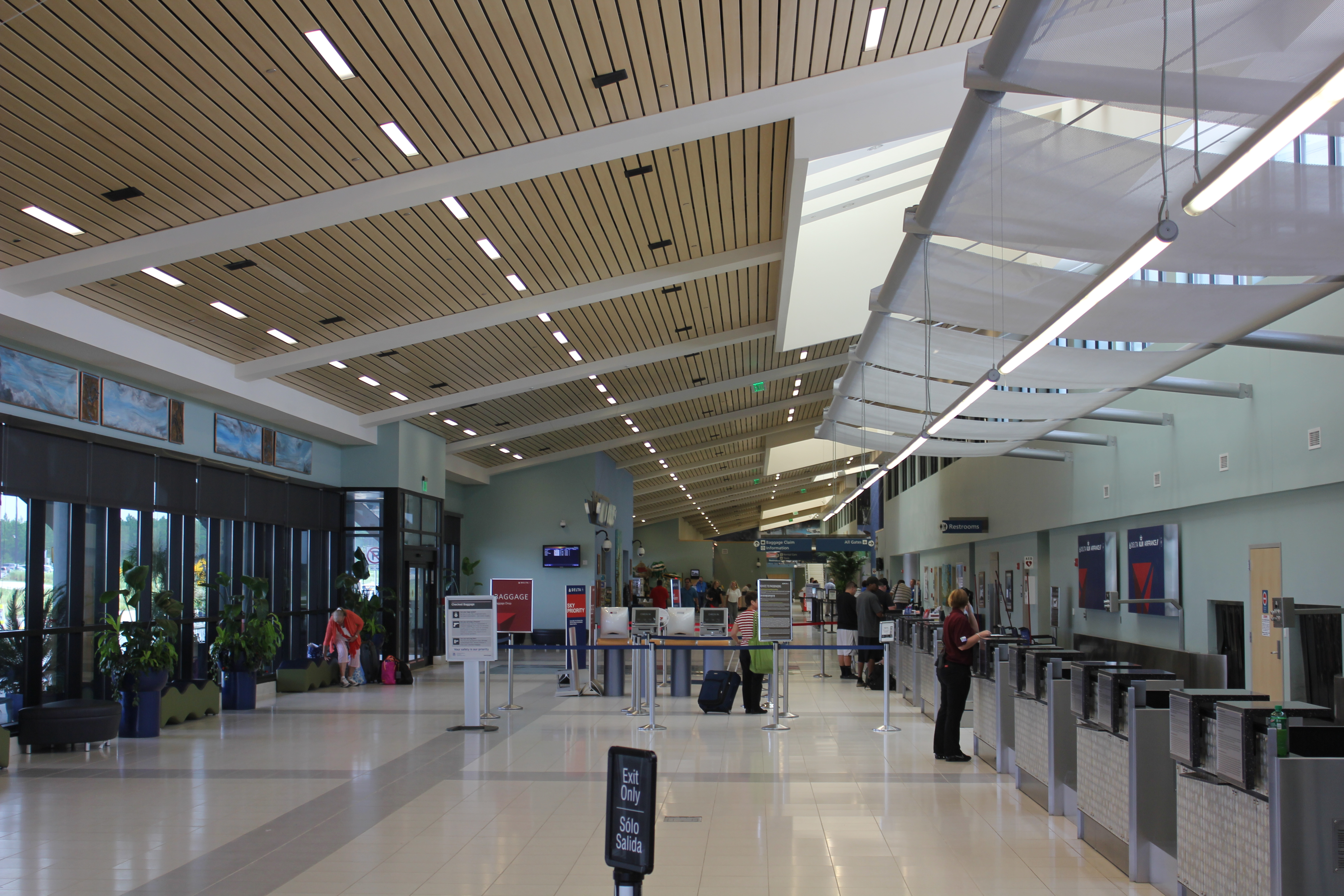
- IATA: ECP; ICAO: KECP; FAA LID: ECP

Summary
- Airport type: Public
- Owner: Panama City-Bay County Airport and Industrial District
- Serves: Panama City; Panama City Beach
- Location: Bay County, Florida, U.S.
- Opened: May 23, 2010; 16 years ago
- Elevation AMSL: 69 ft (21 m)
- Coordinates: 30°21′30″N 085°47′44″W
- Website: www.iflybeaches.com

Maps
- FAA airport diagram
- Interactive map of Northwest Florida Beaches International Airport

Runways
Direction	Length		Surface
Direction	ft	m	Surface
16/34	10,000	3,048	Concrete

Statistics (2025)
- Aircraft operations: 98,556
- Passengers: 1,937,224
- Source: Federal Aviation Administration

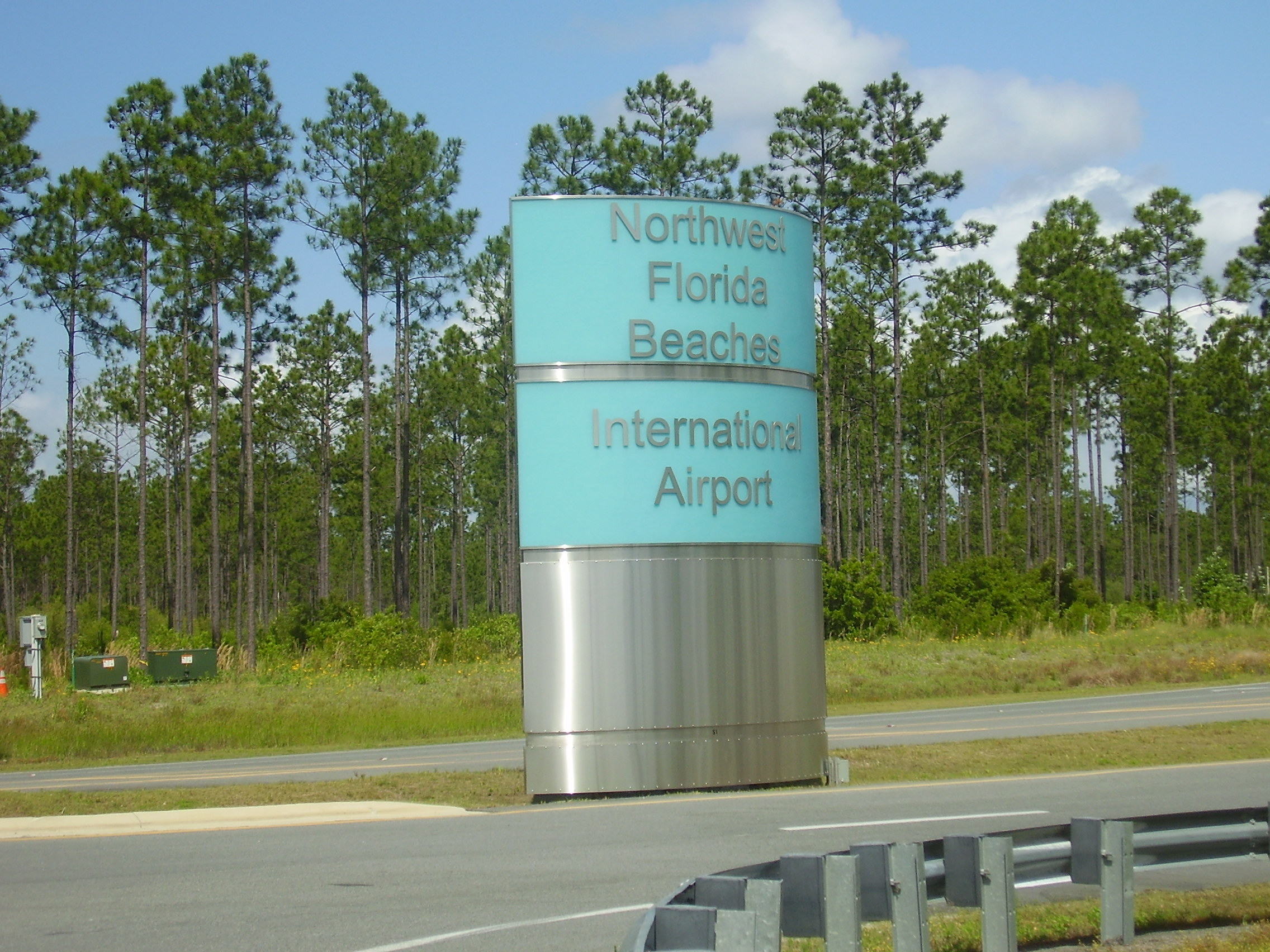
Entrance sign

Northwest Florida Beaches International Airport (IATA: ECP, ICAO: KECP, FAA LID: ECP) is a public airport 18 miles (29 km) northwest of Panama City, Florida, United States, in Bay County. The airport is owned by the Panama City-Bay County Airport & Industrial District, and is north of Panama City Beach, near West Bay. It replaced Panama City–Bay County International Airport (Fannin Field, PFN), which was located in Panama City.

The airport opened for commercial flights on May 23, 2010, and is the first international airport in the United States designed and built since the September 11 attacks. The airport currently has no scheduled international flights, due to the small population in the surrounding areas and the fact that the demand for visitation to Panama City is mostly regional and/or national. The airport authority originally decided to name it Northwest Florida–Panama City International Airport, but airlines and the general public asked the airport authority to use a more regional name.

== History ==
In the late 1980s, the Panama City-Bay County Airport and Industrial District (Airport Authority) started discussing the need to expand the airport's two runways, which did not meet federal standards due to insufficient runway safety areas. Growing the overall airport to meet the region's needs was another main objective.

The old airport had been built in 1932, with scheduled service beginning in 1948. However, it did not have enough room to expand. Proposed ideas included using the current airport property and extending the current short runways into St. Andrews Bay or into residential neighborhoods, relocation of the airport to a new site, or collocation with Tyndall AFB. With strong opposition to extending the runways into an environmentally sensitive bay or into neighborhoods, the airport authority began to search for relocation sites. The authority received tentative approval to build a new airport in northwestern Bay County in 2001. In 2005–2007 the authority obtained the needed permits.

The relocation of the airport was controversial in Bay County. The county commission chose to proceed with building a new airport and closing down Fannin Field despite a majority of voters in a non-binding 2004 referendum voting against the plan. Some felt that the St. Joe Company, which owned the land the airport would be based on, would derive an unfair benefit at the taxpayers' expense. Suits were filed against the airport on environmental grounds but were not successful in halting its construction. Construction was completed in May 2010, however the planned crosswind runway was not built. As of January 2024 construction of the airport terminal has begun to extend the terminal south adding a second baggage claim. News has also been released stating the originally planned crosswind runway's construction will begin in late 2024 to early 2025 expected to accept passengers by June 2025. The new crosswind runway will span a total of 10,000 feet and will allow airlines and general aviation pilots to land during heavy crosswinds more comfortably.

The airport originally sought to use TFB as its IATA code, for "The Florida Beaches". However, this code was already taken by the Tifalmin Airport in Papua New Guinea. The code ECP was chosen instead, which officially stands for Emerald Coast of the Panhandle. The phrase "Everyone Can Party" was jokingly applied to the code.

== Facilities and aircraft ==
The airport covers 4,000 acres (1,600 hectares) at an elevation of 68 feet (21 m).

The airport is in unincorporated Bay County, Florida.

=== Runway ===
Runway 16/34 is the only runway at the airport. It is concrete/grooved and is 10,000 feet (3,000 meters) long and 150 feet (46 meters) wide. There are plans to build one crosswind and one parallel runway as traffic at the airport increases.

The elevation for Runway 16 is 68.6 feet (20.9 m). The runway has a 4-aligned PAPI light system (glideslope: 2.83°), a MALSR approach lighting system, centerline lights, and touchdown zone lights. The runway has an instrument approach which includes S-ILS or LOC/DME, and GPS RNAV. For general aviation aircraft, the runway uses left traffic pattern.

The opposite end of Runway 16, the elevation for Runway 34 is 53.7 feet (16.4 meters). This runway has a 4-aligned PAPI light system (glideslope: 2.83°) and centerline lights. This runway has a GPS RNAV or LOC/DME instrument approach. For general aviation aircraft, the runway uses left traffic pattern.

=== Terminal ===
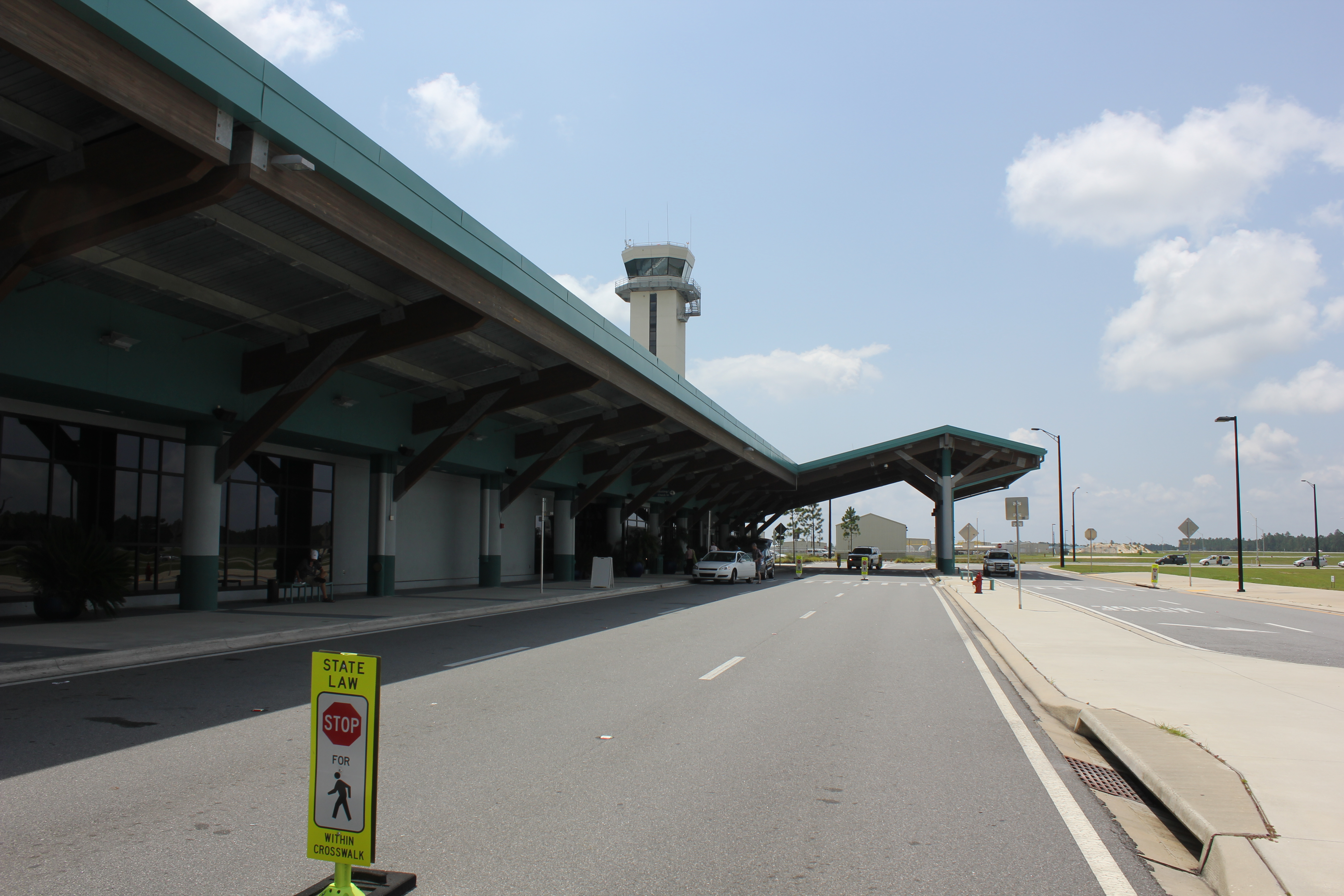
Roadway in front of airport

The new airport has a much larger terminal, designed by HNTB, compared to the terminal at the previous airport. The terminal, 105,000 sq. feet, has seven gates. Gates 1–5 have jet bridges, while Gates 6 and 7 are on ramp level for regional aircraft. The airport has a US Customs and Border Protection inspection facility for arriving international flights. No international Airline flight has ever departed or arrived at KECP. It was anticipated that the new terminal building will be the first airport terminal to attain a LEED rating for being a green building as well. As of June 2024, it has yet to receive this. A new terminal building at Appleton International Airport has since become the first LEED-rated terminal building in the world.

As of 2023, the airport has a $14.7 million renovation in the works to pave an overflow parking lot, build out the terminal, and expand the baggage area.

In 2026, the airport started construction on a new 80,000 terminal expansion that will include three new gates; six airline baggage offices; additional baggage claim carousels; and more. Additional upgrades will be made to the roads leading into and out of the airport as well as the rental car return.

=== General aviation ===
General aviation is handled at the general aviation facility south of the main passenger terminal. As of 2012, 75% of based aircraft belonged to corporations. About 75% of GA operations were business/corporate related, 65% of which were business jets. The only Fixed-Base Operator (FBO) at the airport as of August 2011 was SheltAir. Precision Flight Training and Patriot Flight Academy offer flight training. Patriot Pilot Academy is currently the only flight training at ECP offering multi engine and commercial certifications; it is also a Part 141 school certified through the FAA offering finance options and college-like classes for flight school.

As of April 2024, Alabama-based Southern Sky Aviation has opened a state of the art FBO just south of the Public Safety building. Southern Sky Aviation hosts a Part 145 Aircraft repair station with Avionics installation and interior work as well. They also offer Aircraft maintenance and sales.

=== Air cargo ===
The air cargo facility is between the control tower and general aviation ramp. Flight Express is the primary air cargo service to KECP.

=== Aircraft operations ===
In the 12-month period ending February 28, 2022, the airport had 80,665 aircraft operations, average 221 per day: 55% general aviation, 24% commercial, 13% air taxi, and 9% military. For the same time period, 111 aircraft were based at the airport: 76 single-engine and 8 multi-engine airplanes as well as 26 jets and 1 glider. These stats are up from 67,121 aircraft operations in 2018.

=== Ground transportation ===
Ground transportation to and from the airport includes on-airport car rental, taxis, shuttles, and limousines.

== Airlines and destinations ==
Southwest Airlines began service in May 2010 with eight daily Boeing 737 flights: two each to Baltimore-Washington (BWI), Houston–Hobby (HOU), Nashville (BNA), and Orlando (MCO). Southwest then started daily seasonal nonstop service to St. Louis (STL) on June 3, 2012.

In March 2016, Delta Air Lines was operating up to six nonstop flights a day to Atlanta (ATL) operated with Boeing 717, McDonnell Douglas MD-88, and McDonnell Douglas MD-90 jetliners. Delta has also operated Boeing 737 jets into the airport in the past. Delta Connection had operated regional jet aircraft on their flights to Atlanta but currently does not serve the Atlanta route from the airport. According to FlightAware, Delta currently operates Airbus A320 and Boeing 717 and according to delta.com; Boeing 737-900ER jetliners on its mainline service between the airport and Atlanta.

United utilizes United Express Mesa Airlines and CommuteAir regional jets on their nonstop flights to George Bush Intercontinental Airport (IAH). Seasonally, mainline United are operated to O'Hare International Airport and Denver International Airport.

On January 18, 2018, Northwest Florida Beaches International Airport announced the beginning of American Airlines nonstop flights to Charlotte Douglas (CLT) and Dallas/Fort Worth (DFW), which commenced on June 7, 2018. There are two flights per day to both destinations operated by American Eagle regional carriers PSA Airlines and Mesa Airlines, respectively with regional jets.

The airport had its two busiest years on record in 2021 and 2022, respectively. Airport officials peg the increases on the uptick in traffic caused by the 2020 COVID-19 pandemic. The airport processed nearly 1.6 million passengers in 2021, up from 1.35 million in 2019, and just over 1.5 million in 2021.

=== Passenger ===
Scheduled nonstop passenger flights include:

Airlines	Destinations
American Airlines	Seasonal: Charlotte, Dallas/Fort Worth
American Eagle	Charlotte, Dallas/Fort Worth, Washington–National; Seasonal: Chicago–O'Hare, Philadelphia
Delta Air Lines	Atlanta
Delta Connection	Austin, New York–LaGuardia
Southwest Airlines	Austin, Dallas–Love, Denver, Houston–Hobby, Nashville, St. Louis; Seasonal: Baltimore, Chicago–Midway, Columbus–Glenn, Indianapolis, Kansas City, Milwaukee (begins March 11, 2027), Pittsburgh (begins June 5, 2027)
United Airlines	Seasonal: Chicago-O'Hare, Denver
United Express	Houston–Intercontinental; Seasonal: Chicago–O'Hare, Denver

Destinations map
Destinations from Northwest Florida Beaches International Airport
Red = Year-round destination
Green = Seasonal destination
Blue = Future destination
Pink = Destination being terminated

=== Cargo ===
Airlines	Destinations
Flight Express	Birmingham (AL)
Key Lime Air	Albany (GA)
Martinaire	Albany (GA)

== Statistics ==
=== Annual traffic ===
ECP Airport Annual Traffic 2011-Present
Year	Passengers	% Change
2011	869,389	—
2012	883,592	▲1.63%
2013	816,478	▼7.60%
2014	815,160	▼0.16%
2015	890,764	▲9.27%
2016	897,679	▲0.77%
2017	939,437	▲4.65%
2018	1,056,101	▲12.42%
2019	1,275,488	▲20.77%
2020	822,236	▼35.54%
2021	1,598,492	▲94.41%
2022	1,520,783	▼4.86%
2023	1,660,479	▲9.19%
2024	1,878,945	▲13.16%
2025	1,937,224	▲3.10%

Carrier shares (September 2025 – August 2026)
Carrier	Passengers (arriving and departing)
Southwest	786,000(40.05%)
Delta	543,000(27.69%)
PSA	208,000(10.58%)
Envoy	120,000(6.10%)
CommuteAir	58,640(2.99%)
Other	247,000(12.58%)

Top domestic destinations (September 2025 – August 2026)
Rank	Airport	Passengers	Carriers
1	(Georgia (U.S. state)) Atlanta, GA	273,310	Delta
2	(Tennessee) Nashville, TN	126,350	Southwest
3	(Texas) Dallas/Fort Worth, TX	88,560	American
4	(Texas) Dallas–Love, TX	81,390	Southwest
5	(North Carolina) Charlotte, NC	68,510	American
6	(Texas) Houston–Intercontinental, TX	58,870	United
7	(Texas) Austin, TX	50,680	Delta, Southwest
8	(Illinois) Chicago–O'Hare, IL	43,120	American, United
9	(Texas) Houston-Hobby, TX	40,950	Southwest
10	(Missouri) St. Louis, MO	38,950	Southwest

== Accidents and incidents ==
- On July 28, 2016, a Piper Arrow was damaged while on approach to the Northwest Florida Beaches airport. The airplane experienced a total loss of engine power for reasons that could not be determined because postaccident examination did not reveal any evidence of preimpact mechanical malfunctions or failures that would have precluded normal operation.
- On June 24, 2017, an Aero Commander 200D sustained substantial damage during a forced landing while approaching Northwest Florida Beaches International Airport. The accident was caused by the pilot's inadequate fuel management, which resulted in a total loss of engine power due to fuel starvation. Both occupants survived.
- On November 10, 2017, a Cessna 180 crashed while landing at Florida Beaches International Airport. During the landing roll in gusting crosswind conditions, the right wing "suddenly" lifted, and the pilot applied right aileron to correct. He added that the control application did not correct the raised right wing and the left wing dragged on the runway, which resulted in the airplane coming to rest nosed over. The probable cause of the accident was found to be the pilot's failure to maintain lateral/bank control during landing in gusting crosswind conditions.
- On March 8, 2022, a Cessna 182 bearing N182XT crashed two miles short of runway 16 killing two occupants, Donald Slattery and Diane Slattery. An NTSB investigation found the pilot's deviation from the final approach course during a night instrument approach with low instrument meteorological conditions resulted in an impact with heavily wooded terrain. Contributing to the accident was the pilot's decision to continue the approach after being warned of his flightpath deviations and his lack of experience in instrument conditions at night.
- On June 6, 2022, a Piper PA-28 bearing N160LL crashed after shortly taking off from ECP killing two and seriously injuring one passenger. An NTSB investigation found maintenance personnel's failure to follow the avionics installation guidance for the oil pressure sensor, which resulted in the high-cycle fatigue failure of a line, oil starvation, and the subsequent loss of engine power. Contributing to the accident was the pilot's failure to perform an adequate preflight inspection of the airplane.
- On June 6, 2023, a Dassault Falcon 10 touched down off the runway while landing at Northwest Florida Beaches International Airport. The aircraft touched down in a dry storm water pond. All five aboard were uninjured.

== See also ==
- List of airports in Florida
