= Panama City–Bay County International Airport =

Airport of Panama City, Florida, United States (1932–2010)

- IATA: PFN; ICAO: KPFN; FAA LID: PFN

Summary
- Airport type: Defunct
- Owner: Panama City–Bay County Airport and Industrial District
- Serves: Panama City, Florida
- Opened: 1932
- Closed: October 1, 2010 (general aviation)
- Passenger services ceased: May 22, 2010
- Elevation AMSL: 20 ft (6.1 m)
- Coordinates: 30°12′44″N 085°40′58″W
- Website: www.pcairport.com (archived)

Map
- Interactive map of Panama City–Bay County International Airport

Runways
Direction	Length		Surface
Direction	ft	m	Surface
14/32	6,308	1,923	Asphalt
5/23	4,884	1,489	Asphalt

Statistics (2007)
- Aircraft operations: 84,445
- Based aircraft: 133
- Source: Federal Aviation Administration

Panama City–Bay County International Airport (IATA: PFN, ICAO: KPFN, FAA LID: PFN) was a public airport 3 miles (4.8 km) northwest of Panama City, in Bay County, Florida. It was owned and operated by the Panama City–Bay County Airport and Industrial District. All airline services moved to the Northwest Florida Beaches International Airport on May 22, 2010, but the airfield was open to general aviation aircraft until October 1, 2010. The grounds will eventually be turned over to LUK-MB1 LLC, which plans to remove the runways and build homes, shops, walking trails and a marina.

== History ==
Panama City–Bay County International Airport (PFN) began as a private field owned by J. B. Atkinson, Jr., a citizen of Panama City. The facility had 292 acres (1.2 km^{2}) of land with grass landing strips. In 1932 Atkinson and his wife donated the property to the Panama City Chamber of Commerce so a city airport could be established. At that time the airport was named Atkinson Field. In 1938 Panama City and the Bay County Commissioners joined forces to develop the airport through the construction of an airport terminal and extensive airfield expansion. The facility's $604,000 development project included the construction of a small passenger terminal and two 4,000-foot (1,200 m) intersecting runways. After the expansion was completed, the airport was renamed Fannin Field in honor of Panama City's then-mayor, Harry G. Fannin.

Through World War II the airport was a Civil Air Patrol facility, the location of Coastal Patrol Base 14. In 1943 the Florida legislature approved the formation of an airport authority, the Panama City–Bay County Airport and Industrial District, to manage Fannin Field, or Panama City–Bay County Airport, as it became known. In 1948 commercial scheduled passenger airline operations began.

In 1992 the airport was equipped with on-call customs and immigrations facilities provided through the Port of Panama City and was designated as an international airport and renamed Panama City–Bay County International Airport. The airport was declared a Foreign Trade Zone (FTZ), allowing special customs procedures. These permit domestic activity involving foreign items to take place as though they were outside of U.S. Customs territory.

In 1995 the airport went through extensive development, demolishing the old terminal building and building a new 55,573-square-foot (5,162.9 m^{2}) facility with six gates, two with jetbridges. The terminal had concession areas, a passenger hold room, ticketing counters and airline office space, airport administration offices, public and rental car parking lots, and a larger apron. Service included Delta Connection to Atlanta, US Airways Express to Charlotte (and other destinations initially in Florida) and Northwest Airlink to Memphis.

However, by the late 1990s, it was obvious that the airport was nearing the end of its useful life. The runways were very short by modern standards, but could not be expanded without either extending them into nearby St. Andrews Bay or residential neighborhoods. It was eventually decided to build a new airport in Panama City Beach, which eventually became Northwest Florida Beaches International Airport. The new airport opened May 23, 2010 with flights operated by Delta Air Lines with a mainline jetliner service to Atlanta as well as new service operated by Southwest Airlines with Boeing 737 jetliners.

== Past airline service ==
From the 1950s until the late 1970s, two airlines served Panama City: National Airlines and Southern Airways. In the early 1950s National Lockheed Lodestars flew to Jacksonville and New Orleans via various stops. Southern began service in the mid 1950s with Douglas DC-3s to Atlanta via several stops. In 1967 National Lockheed L-188 Electra propjets flew direct to Miami, New Orleans, Orlando, Jacksonville, Mobile and Key West and nonstop to Pensacola and Tallahassee. The first jets were Southern Douglas DC-9-10s in 1967. In 1968, Southern DC-9s flew direct to Atlanta via Dothan, AL while their Martin 4-0-4 prop aircraft flew nonstop to Atlanta, Dothan and Fort Walton Beach (via Eglin AFB), and direct to Birmingham, Montgomery and New Orleans. In 1969 National Boeing 727-100s flew direct to Miami, Tampa, New Orleans, Houston, Mobile, Jacksonville and Melbourne, FL and nonstop to Pensacola and Tallahassee.

By the spring of 1975 all National and Southern flights to Panama City were operated with mainline jets (National with Boeing 727-100 and 727-200s with Southern operating Douglas DC-9-10s) with a combined total of fourteen jet flights arriving every weekday into the airport. In 1976 National Boeing 727-200s flew direct to Panama City from New York JFK Airport, Washington D.C. National Airport (now Reagan Airport), Las Vegas, San Francisco, Houston, New Orleans, Miami, Charleston, Norfolk, Jacksonville and Mobile as well as nonstop from Tampa, Tallahassee and Pensacola. Southern Douglas DC-9-10s and McDonnell Douglas DC-9-30s flew nonstop from Atlanta, Dothan, Eglin AFB and Tallahassee and direct from Miami and Orlando. In 1977 South Central Air Transport (SCAT), a commuter airline, was flying to New Orleans, Montgomery, Mobile and Fort Walton Beach (via Eglin AFB) with Handley Page Jetstream propjets.

National Airlines was no longer serving Panama City by 1979. Southern Airways had merged with North Central Airlines to form Republic Airlines which flew nonstop DC-9-10, DC-9-30 and DC-9-50 jets to Atlanta, Orlando and Tallahassee and direct to Chicago O'Hare Airport, Memphis, Huntsville and Miami. Also in 1979, Air Florida, a new start-up airline, was serving Panama City as well with Boeing 737-200 and Douglas DC-9-10 jets nonstop to Pensacola and Tallahassee and direct to Tampa and Miami.

Metro Airlines (operating code sharing flights as Eastern Metro Express on behalf of Eastern Airlines) was flying BAe Jetstream 31 and de Havilland Canada DHC-8 Dash 8 turboprops nonstop between Panama City and Atlanta beginning in the mid 1980s.

In 1986 Republic Airlines was acquired by and merged into Northwest Airlines which in 1987 flew Douglas DC-9-10s and McDonnell Douglas DC-9-30s nonstop between Panama City and its hub in Memphis.

Air New Orleans (operating code sharing service as Continental Express on behalf of Continental Airlines) was flying small Beechcraft C99 commuter turboprops nonstop to Orlando and Tampa and direct to New Orleans in 1987. Air New Orleans was initially based in Panama City.

By 1991 Delta Air Lines McDonnell Douglas DC-9-30s flew nonstop to Atlanta. Previously in 1989, Atlantic Southeast Airlines (ASA) de Havilland Canada DHC-7 Dash 7 and Embraer EMB-120 Brasilia propjets flew nonstop to Atlanta operating as the Delta Connection on a code sharing basis on behalf of Delta and these flights then continued in tandem with Delta's mainline jet service.

In 1994 Delta Air Lines Boeing 737-200s and McDonnell Douglas MD-80s flew nonstop to Atlanta and direct to Dallas/Fort Worth, Louisville and Norfolk with Delta operating the only mainline jet service into Panama City at the time. Atlantic Southeast Airlines (ASA) was continuing to fly nonstop from Atlanta with Embraer EMB-120 Brasilia turboprops. Northwest Airlink was flying nonstop from Memphis with Saab 340 turboprops on a code sharing basis on behalf of Northwest Airlines. US Airways Express Beechcraft 1900C commuter turboprops were serving the airport on behalf of US Airways with code sharing flights nonstop from Orlando, Tampa and Fort Walton Beach.

In 2007 Delta Connection Canadair CRJ-200, CRJ-700 and Embraer ERJ-145 regional jets as well as ATR 72 turboprops were flying nonstop to Atlanta. Delta Connection Embraer ERJ-145s also flew nonstop to Orlando while their Canadair CRJs flew nonstop to Cincinnati on Saturdays only with Northwest Airlink Canadair CRJ regional jets flying nonstop to Memphis.

Other commuter airlines serving the airport over the years including Dolphin Airlines, Mackey International Airlines, Scheduled Skyways and Sun Air.

== Facilities ==
Panama City–Bay County International Airport covered 745 acres (301 ha) at an elevation of 20 feet (6 m). It had two asphalt runways: 14/32 was 6,308 x 150 ft (1,923 x 46 m) and 5/23 was 4,884 x 150 ft (1,489 x 46 m).

In 2006 the airport had 88,059 aircraft operations, average 241 per day: 72% general aviation, 13% air taxi (11,080), 10% military and 5% airline. 160 aircraft were then based at the airport: 58% single-engine, 18% multi-engine, 9% jet and 15% helicopter.

== Accidents and incidents ==
- On June 26, 1990, a Piper Chieftain crashed after takeoff from the Bay County International Airport. Both engines failed due to improper maintenance.
- On March 3, 1993, a Piper Aerostar 600 crashed at the Bay County International Airport. The probable cause of the accident was found to be the pilot's poorly planned approach to the runway following an instrument approach, resulting in a loss of control.
- On March 18, 2005, a Beech C-45H experienced collapse of the left main landing gear during the landing roll at Bay County International Airport. The probable cause of the accident was found to be the overload failure of the left main landing gear for undetermined reasons during the landing roll, resulting in its collapse.
- On June 16, 2005, a Cessna 150 crashed while on approach to the Bay County International Airport. The probable cause of the accident was found to be the pilot's misjudgment of distance/altitude while on final approach with a tailwind, which resulted in an undershoot of the runway.
- On April 13, 2006, a Beechcraft C24R Sierra was damaged during landing at the Bay County International Airport. The cause of the accident was found to be a flat tire, which occurred for undetermined reasons, that resulted an inadvertent loss of control during the landing roll.
- On May 27, 2011, a Bell OH-58C Kiowa helicopter operating for the Bay County Sheriff's Office was damaged while hover-taxiing out of a hangar at the recently-closed airport. It was found that a drooping electrical conduit snagged the helicopter's vertical fin and resulted in the pilot's inability to control the helicopter. Contributing to the accident was the operator's decision to have the pilot fly the helicopter out of the hangar.
