= PZL M26 Iskierka =

Polish trainer and aerobatic aircraft

M26 Iskierka
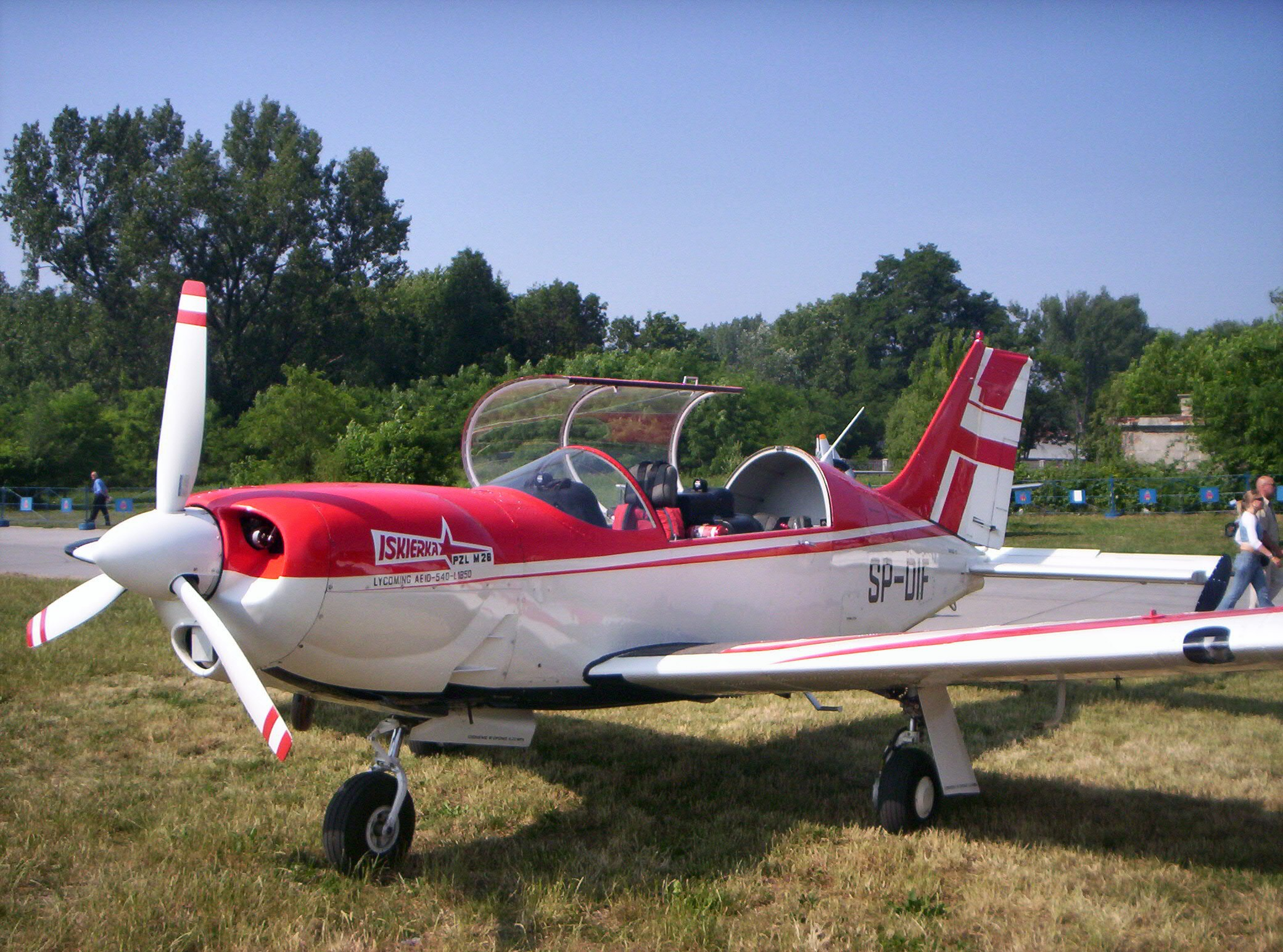

General information
- Type: Trainer aircraft
- Manufacturer: PZL Mielec
- Status: in production
- Primary users: US civilian aviation Poland; Venezuela
- Number built: 9

History
- First flight: July 15, 1986

PZL M26 Iskierka (English: Sparklet, Sparkle, Little Spark) or M26 Airwolf is a Polish trainer and aerobatic aircraft, designed at WSK PZL-Mielec (later PZL Mielec).

== Design and development ==
The M26 Iskierka was conceived as an economical plane for civilian pilot training and primary selection of military pilots. It offers training in both VFR and IFR flying as well as aerobatics. Its construction is partly based upon the twin-engine PZL M-20 Mewa utility plane (Piper PA-34 Seneca II, built under licence in WSK-Mielec). It shares the vertical stabilizer, rudder and main landing gear with the Mewa, while the wings and tail part of fuselage are unified to some degree. The plane is constructed according to FAR-23 rules. The main designer was Krzysztof Piwek.

The first prototype M26-00, powered by a PZL-Franklin 6A-350C1 air-cooled flat-six engine rated at 153 kilowatts (205 hp), flew first on July 15, 1986. The second prototype was the more powerful M26-01 variant, powered by a 220 kilowatts (300 hp) Lycoming AEIO-540-L1B5D engine, and first flew on June 24, 1987. It was tested in a military aviation school in Dęblin in 1992.

Only a short series of 9 aircraft were manufactured, of which one remains in Poland. The plane is still offered by the PZL Mielec and is certified in the US, Australia and Europe (EASA). In the USA it is offered under the name Airwolf or Air Wolf, and eight were exported there, beginning from 1996. In 1998 two were delivered to the Venezuelan National Guard. There were plans to fit a Walter M601 turboprop engine, for eventual customers' demand, however it was determined that the changes to the airframe would be significant and the project was abandoned.

== Description ==
The M26 Iskierka is a low-wing monoplane, conventional in layout, metal covered with a semi-monocoque fuselage. Rectangular single-spar wings. Crew of two, sitting in tandem, under a common canopy, with double controls (student in front, instructor in rear). The rear seat is raised by 15 cm. The canopy is dropped in emergency. Retractable tricycle landing gear. Three-blade propeller (1.9 m diameter). Fuel tanks in wings (377 L). The plane may be fitted with a camera gun and racks for two small bombs.

== Operators ==
- Poland
- United States
- Venezuela

== Specifications (M26 01) ==
Data from Jane's All The World's Aircraft 1993–94, Jane's all the World's Aircraft 2004–05

General characteristics

- Crew: 2
- Length: 8.295 m (27 ft 3 in)
- Wingspan: 8.6 m (28 ft 3 in)
- Height: 2.96 m (9 ft 9 in)
- Wing area: 14 m^{2} (150 sq ft)
- Aspect ratio: 5.3
- Airfoil: NACA65_{2}-415
- Empty weight: 1,040 kg (2,293 lb)
- Max takeoff weight: 1,315 kg (2,899 lb) Aerobatic mission; 1,400 kg (3,100 lb) Utility mission
- Fuel capacity: 369 L (97 US gal; 81 imp gal) in four wing tanks; Oil capacity 18 L (4.8 US gal; 4.0 imp gal)
- Powerplant: 1 × Textron Lycoming AEIO-540-L1B5 6-cylinder horizontally-opposed air-cooled piston engine, 224 kW (300 hp)
- Propellers: 3-bladed Hoffman HO-V123K-V/200AH-10 OR Hartzell HC-C3YR-4BF, 1.9 m (6 ft 3 in) diameter constant-speed propeller

Performance

- Maximum speed: 330 km/h (210 mph, 180 kn) Aerobatic mission; 321 km/h (199 mph; 173 kn) Utility mission
- Never exceed speed: 395 km/h (245 mph, 213 kn) Aerobatic mission; 371 km/h (231 mph; 200 kn) Utility mission
- Range: 1,410 km (880 mi, 760 nmi) 30 min reserve fuel
- g limits: +6 / -3 Aerobatic mission; +4.4 / -1.76 Utility mission at Max take-off weight
- Rate of climb: 7.5 m/s (1,480 ft/min) Aerobatic mission; 6 m/s (20 ft/s) Utility mission
- Wing loading: 93.9 kg/m^{2} (19.2 lb/sq ft) Aerobatic mission; 100 kg/m^{2} (20 lb/sq ft) Utility mission
- Power/mass: 5.88 kg/kW (9.66 lb/hp) Aerobatic mission; 6.26 kg/kW (10.29 lb/hp) Utility mission

== See also ==
Related development

- PZL M-20 Mewa
- Piper PA-34 Seneca

Aircraft of comparable role, configuration, and era

- Aermacchi SF.260
- Aérospatiale Epsilon
- Utva Lasta
- T-35 Pillán
