= Podlaskie-Masurian Border Protection Forces Brigade =

- Podlasko-Mazurska Brygada Wojsk Ochrony Pogranicza
- Active: 1976 - 16 May 1991
- Allegiance: Polish People's Republic
- Branch: Border Protection Forces
- Type: Border guard brigade
- Garrison/HQ: Białystok

Podlaskie-Masurian Border Protection Forces Brigade (Polish: Podlasko-Mazurska Brygada Wojsk Ochrony Pogranicza) was a brigade of Border Protection Forces serving on the Polish-Soviet border with headquarters in Bema District in Białystok.

== History ==
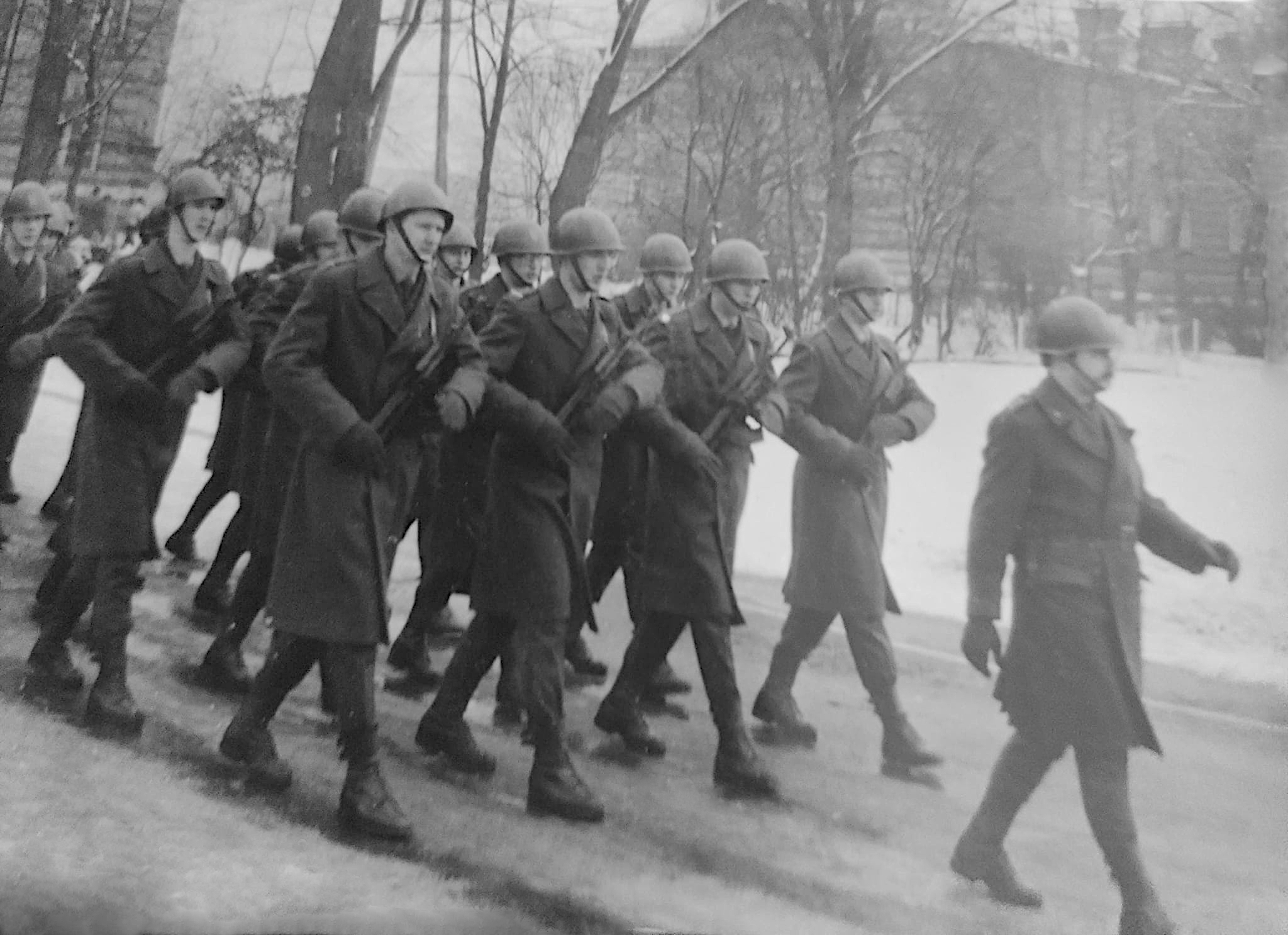
Soldiers of the unit marching in their barracks in Bema street, Białystok in 1982

Formed in 1976 on the basis of the 22nd Białystok Branch of the WOP on the basis of the order of the Ministry of Internal Affairs No. 05/org of January 29, 1976. The brigade headquarters was stationed in Białystok at the barracks at 100 Bema street.

In 1987, the Ogrodniki Border Control Post was established.

In 1989, the left section with the guard stations: Janów Podlaski, Terespol, Sławatycze and border control posts: Terespol, Kukuryki) was taken over from the disbanded Nadbużańska Brigade of Border Protection Forces.

It protected a section of the state border in north-eastern Poland, from Węgorzewo to Sławatycze, 564.37 km long.

The Podlaskie-Masurian WOP Brigade operated until May 15, 1991.

By Order No. 012 of the Commander-in-Chief of the Polish Border Guard of May 7, 1991 regarding the dissolution of WOP units and the creation of organizational units of the Border Guard, the Minister of Internal Affairs ordered as of May 16, 1991 to dissolve the Podlaskie-Masurian Brigade of WOP in Białystok, existing according to post no. 44/0141 with a staff strength of period "W" 1,961 soldiers and 54 civilian employees and for the "P" period 1,235 soldiers and 57 civilian employees. On its basis, a branch of the Border Guard was established: Podlaski Border Guard Regional Unit. The branch was assigned a name related to the region in which it operated. By the same order, the Terespol Border Control Post was dissolved.
