= Lightning Bug =

Lightning Bug may refer to:

- A firefly
  - Photinus (beetle)
  - Photuris (genus)
  - Pyractomena

== Aircraft ==
- Reflex Lightning Bug, an American kit aircraft design of the 1990s
- Ryan Model 147 Lightning Bug, an unmanned aerial vehicle

== Popular culture ==
- Lightning Bug (comics), a Marvel Comics character
- Lightning Bug (film), a 2004 horror film by writer/director Robert Hall
- Lightning Bug (novel), a 1987 novel by American author Donald Harington
- "Lightning Bug" (song), 2020 song by Dean Brody
