= PZL M-20 Mewa =

Twin-engine general aviation aircraft

M-20 Mewa
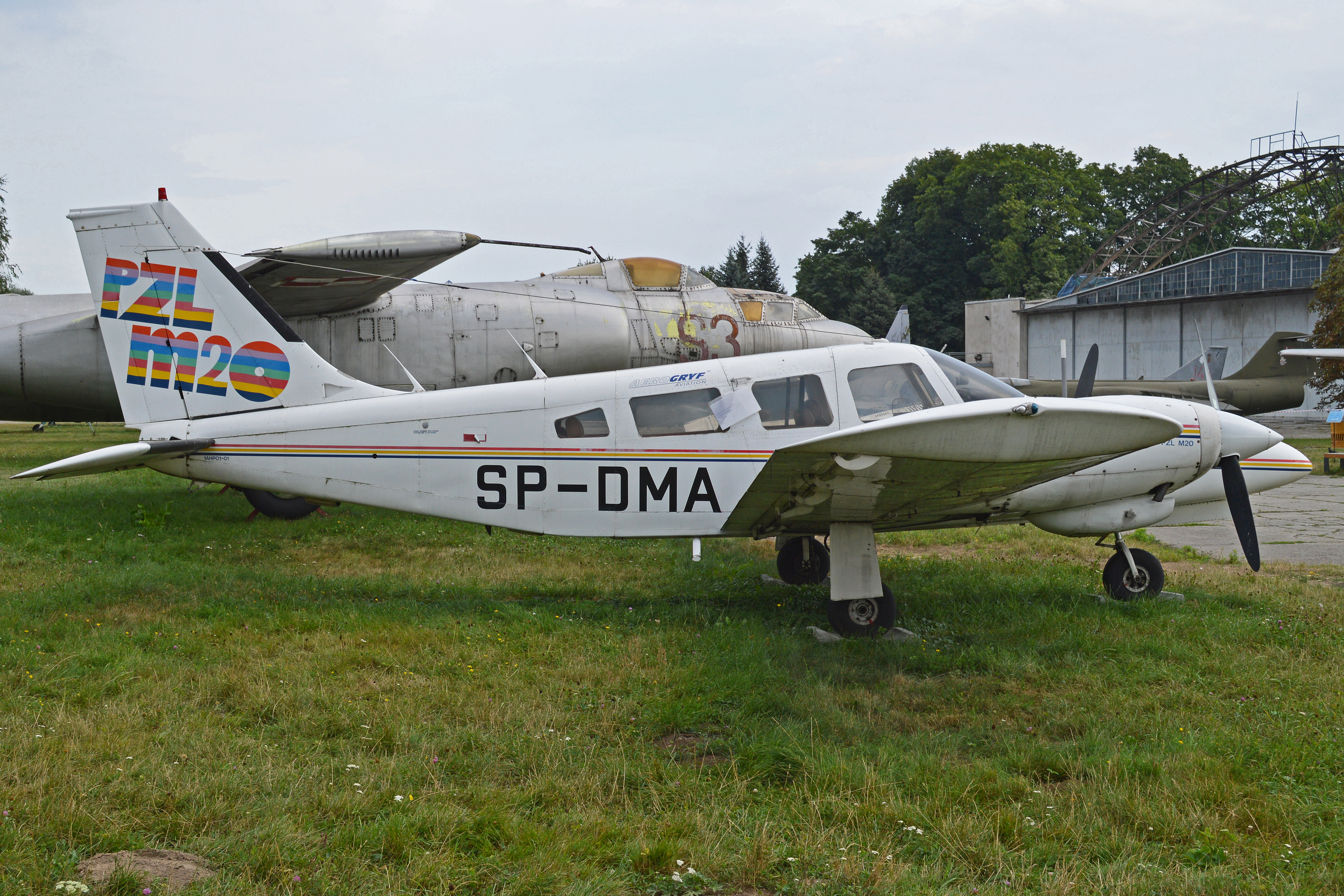
- PZL M 20 Mewa - licence version of Piper PA-34 Seneca

General information
- Type: Utility aircraft
- Manufacturer: PZL-Mielec
- Designer: WSK PZL Mielec
- Primary user: Polish Air Ambulance Service
- Number built: 33

History
- First flight: 25 July 1979
- Developed from: Piper PA-34 Seneca

The PZL-Mielec M-20 Mewa (Polish: Gull) is a licence-built version of the Piper PA-34 Seneca II manufactured in Poland by WSK PZL Mielec in a limited series from the 1980s.

== Development ==
A licence to build the PA-34-200T was purchased in 1978, when WSK-Mielec started to co-operate with Western manufacturers. The Polish aircraft were to be fitted with 164 kW (220 hp) PZL-Franklin F6A-350 engines. The first Mewa, partly assembled from US-delivered parts, flew on 25 July 1979. However, the Polish communist authorities were reluctant to produce civil aircraft of this class as there was no civil aircraft free market in Poland at that time. As a result, the second prototype, built in Poland, was not flown until 1982 and the third M-20 02, being the basis for serial production, on10 October 10, 1985. In 1988, an air ambulance version M-20 03 was developed, with Teledyne Continental TSIO/LTSIO-360-KB engines.

After 1990 production of the Mewa commenced for the civilian market. Despite the fact that it won the Teraz Polska award in 1993, interest was very limited and only 33 had been built by the end of 1998.

In April 2015, Aero AT (Jiangsu) Aviation Industrial bought the intellectual property for the M-20 Mewa from U.S.-based Sikorsky Aircraft's subsidiary PZL Mielec in Poland. Poland-based Aero AT Ltd., Jiangsu Aero AT Aviation Technologies and Changzhou National Hi-Tech District entered into an investment agreement on 30 October 2015. The plan being for Jiangsu Aero to assemble the M-20 Mewa in China at the Changzhou Konggang Industrial Park. The first Chinese produced M-20 Mewa was expected to roll off the production line at the facility in 2017, followed by 50 aircraft annually starting in 2018.

== Operational history ==
Four M-20s were used by the Polish Air Ambulance Service. As of 2006, there were still 14 M-20s on the Polish civilian registry. One is used by the Polish Border Guard.

== Operators ==
Poland

- Lotnicze Pogotowie Ratunkowe (Polish: Air Ambulance Service) operated 4 aircraft till 2009. They were replaced by two Piaggio P.180 Avanti.
- Polish Border Guard received 1 aircraft.

== Specifications (PZL M-20 Mewa) ==
Data from Jane's all the World's Aircraft 1988–89

General characteristics

- Crew: 1 or 2
- Capacity: 4 or 5 pax + optional seventh seat
- Length: 8.72 m (28 ft 7 in)
- Wingspan: 11.86 m (38 ft 11 in)
- Height: 3.02 m (9 ft 11 in)
- Wing area: 19.18 m^{2} (206.5 sq ft)
- Airfoil: NACA 65_{2}-415
- Empty weight: 1,290 kg (2,844 lb)
- Gross weight: 1,810 kg (3,990 lb) (Max zero fuel weight)
- Max takeoff weight: 2,070 kg (4,564 lb)
- Fuel capacity: 371 L (98 US gal; 82 imp gal) in four wing leading edge tanks + optional 113.5 L (30.0 US gal; 25.0 imp gal) in two auxiliary wing leading edge tanks
- Powerplant: 1 × PZL-F 6A-350C1L 6-cylinder air-cooled horizontally-opposed piston engine, 153 kW (205 hp)

LH rotation

- Powerplant: 1 × PZL-F 6A-350C1R 6-cylinder air-cooled horizontally-opposed piston engine, 153 kW (205 hp)

RH rotation

- Propellers: 3-bladed Warszawa-Okecie US 134, 1.93 m (6 ft 4 in) diameter constant-speed propeller with spinner and optional electric de-icing

Performance

- Maximum speed: 275 km/h (171 mph, 148 kn) at 1,500 m (4,900 ft)
- Cruise speed: 260 km/h (160 mph, 140 kn) at 1,500 m (4,900 ft)
- Stall speed: 108 km/h (67 mph, 58 kn) flaps down
- Never exceed speed: 360 km/h (220 mph, 190 kn)
- Range: 550 km (340 mi, 300 nmi) with 45 minutes reserve
- Ferry range: 1,360 km (850 mi, 730 nmi) with auxiliary fuel, 45 minutes reserve
- Service ceiling: 4,000 m (13,000 ft)
- Rate of climb: 6.4 m/s (1,260 ft/min)
- Wing loading: 107.9 kg/m^{2} (22.1 lb/sq ft)
- Power/mass: 0.146 kW/kg (0.089 hp/lb)
- Take-off run to 15 m (49 ft): 460 m (1,510 ft)
- Landing run from 15 m (49 ft): 655 m (2,149 ft)

== See also ==
Related development

- Piper PA-34 Seneca
- PZL M-26 Iskierka
