= 2si 808 =

- Type: Two-stroke aircraft engine
- National origin: United States
- Manufacturer: 2si

The 2si 808 is a family of in-line three cylinder, liquid-cooled, two-stroke, dual ignition, aircraft engines that were designed for ultralight aircraft.

The basic engine was originally designed and produced by JLO-Motorenwerke of Germany and was later acquired by the AMW Cuyuna Engine Company of Beaufort, South Carolina and marketed under the Cuyuna brand name. Later the engine was marketed by Cuyuna under the Two Stroke International (2si) brand. Cuyuna no longer markets engines for aircraft use and the 808 is out of production.

== Development ==
The 808 is a conventional three-cylinder engine that weighs 130 lb (59 kg) in its L95 and L100 aircraft versions. The engine features dual capacitor discharge ignition, liquid cooling, fuel pump, a cast iron cylinder liner, ball, needle and roller bearings throughout. The aircraft version was offered with an optional gearbox reduction system. Starting is electric starter only.

== Variants ==
808 L95
Gasoline aircraft engine with three carburetors, 95 hp (71 kW) at 7000 rpm, weight 130 lb (59 kg), out of production.
808 L100
Gasoline aircraft engine with three carburetors, 100 hp (75 kW) at 7000 rpm, weight 130 lb (59 kg), out of production.

== Applications ==
- Bede BD-5
- Reflex Lightning Bug
- Rowley P-40F

== Specifications (808 L100 aircraft engine) ==
Data from Aerocrafter

=== General characteristics ===
- Type: Three cylinder, two-stroke aircraft engine
- Dry weight: 130 lb (59 kg)

=== Components ===
- Fuel type: Minimum 92 octane
- Oil system: premixed oil and fuel
- Cooling system: liquid cooled
- Reduction gear: gearbox

=== Performance ===
- Power output: 100 hp (75 kW) at 7000 rpm

== See also ==
- List of aircraft engines
- Hirth F-30
- Rotax 618
