= White Lightning WLAC-1 =

American homebuilt aircraft

General information
- Type: Four-seat recreational monoplane
- National origin: United States
- Manufacturer: White Lighting Aircraft Corporation; Reflex Fiberglass Works
- Designer: Nick Jones
- Number built: 10+

History
- First flight: 1986

The White Lightning WLAC-1 is an American four-seat single-engined monoplane designed for amateur construction by Nick Jones and sold as kits by the White Lighting Aircraft Corporation of South Carolina.

In the 1990s the aircraft design was sold in kit form by Reflex Fiberglass Works of Walterboro, South Carolina.

== Development ==
The WLAC-1 is a low-wing monoplane powered by a 210 hp (157 kW) Continental IO-360 piston engine. Of composite construction, it has a retractable nose-wheel landing gear. The four-seats had an unusual arrangement in that the rear two seats face backwards. Kits to build the aircraft were sold for amateur construction. The project is currently managed by Will and Bill Fields. Will has raced the plane in the Reno National Championship races with two wins since 2002.

The prototype first flew on 8 March 1986 as the Jones White Lightning.

== Specifications ==
Data from Taylor

General characteristics

- Crew: 1
- Capacity: 3 passengers
- Length: 23 ft 4 in (7.11 m)
- Wingspan: 27 ft 8 in (8.43 m)
- Empty weight: 1,350 lb (612 kg)
- Gross weight: 2,400 lb (1,089 kg)
- Powerplant: 1 × Continental IO-360 piston, 210 hp (160 kW) Recommended engine

Performance

- Maximum speed: 280 mph (450 km/h, 243 kn)
- Cruise speed: 247 mph (398 km/h, 215 kn)
- Stall speed: 91 mph (146 km/h, 79 kn)
- Range: 2,000 mi (3,219 km, 1,738 nmi)
- Rate of climb: 1,500 ft/min (7.6 m/s)
