= Continental IO-360 =

Aircraft engines manufactured by Continental Motors

IO-360
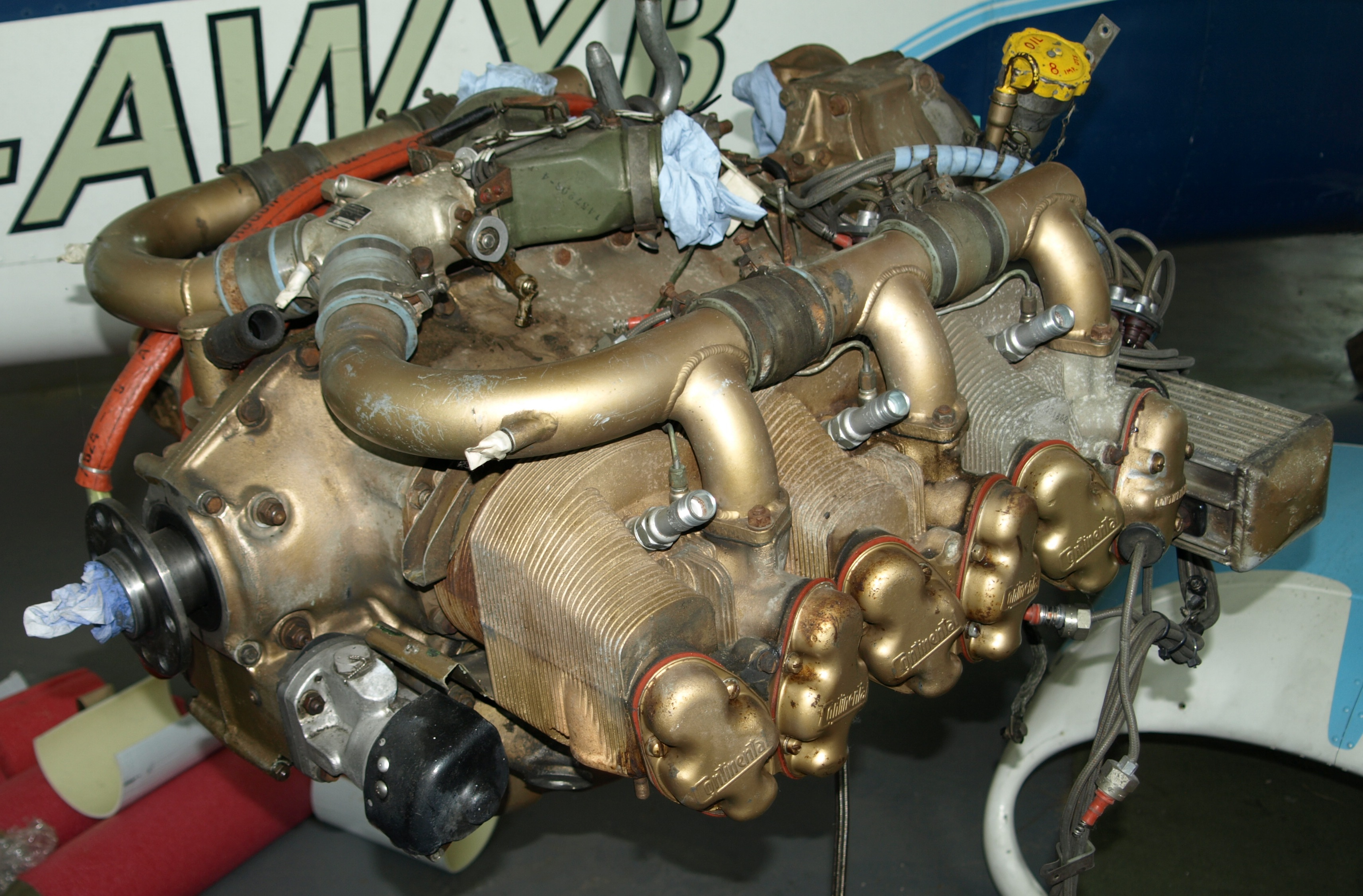
- Continental IO-360-D
- Type: Piston aero-engine
- National origin: United States
- Manufacturer: Continental Motors
- First run: 1962
- Major applications: Cirrus SR20; Ilyushin Il-103; Cessna Skymaster; Piper PA-34 Seneca; Cessna O-2 Skymaster; Cessna T-41 Mescalero

The Continental IO-360 is a family of fuel-injected air-cooled, horizontally opposed six-cylinder aircraft engines manufactured by Continental Motors in the United States of America, now part of AVIC International since 2010.

The engine is available in both naturally aspirated, fuel injected IO-360 models and turbocharged TSIO-360 versions. It is also available in both left and right hand rotation versions for use on twin-engined aircraft.

There was no carbureted version of this engine, which would have been designation O-360, therefore the base model is the IO-360.

== History ==
The IO-360 was first certified by the Federal Aviation Administration on 15 May 1962 to the CAR 13 certification standard, effective June 15, 1956, as amended by 13-1 thru 13–3. The engine is produced by Continental under Production Certificate No. 508.

The turbocharged TSIO-360 series was first certified on 11 October 1966 to the Federal Aviation Regulations Part 33 standard effective February 1, 1965, as amended by 33–1. This series is manufactured under Production Certificate No. 7, except the TSIO-360-D which is under Production Certificate No. 508.

== Variants ==
=== IO-360 ===
IO-360-A
210 hp (157 kW) at 2800 rpm, Minimum fuel grade 100 or 100LL avgas, compression ratio 8.5:1. Base IO-360 model: a six-cylinder air-cooled, horizontally opposed direct drive, fuel injected engine. Uses a TCM 639230A3 fuel injector. The crankshaft has two 6th order dampers.
IO-360-AB
210 hp (157 kW) at 2800 rpm, Minimum fuel grade 100 or 100LL avgas, compression ratio 8.5:1. Uses a TCM 639230A3 fuel injector. Same as the IO-360-A except for modified crankshaft. The crankshaft has one 6th and one 4½ order damper.

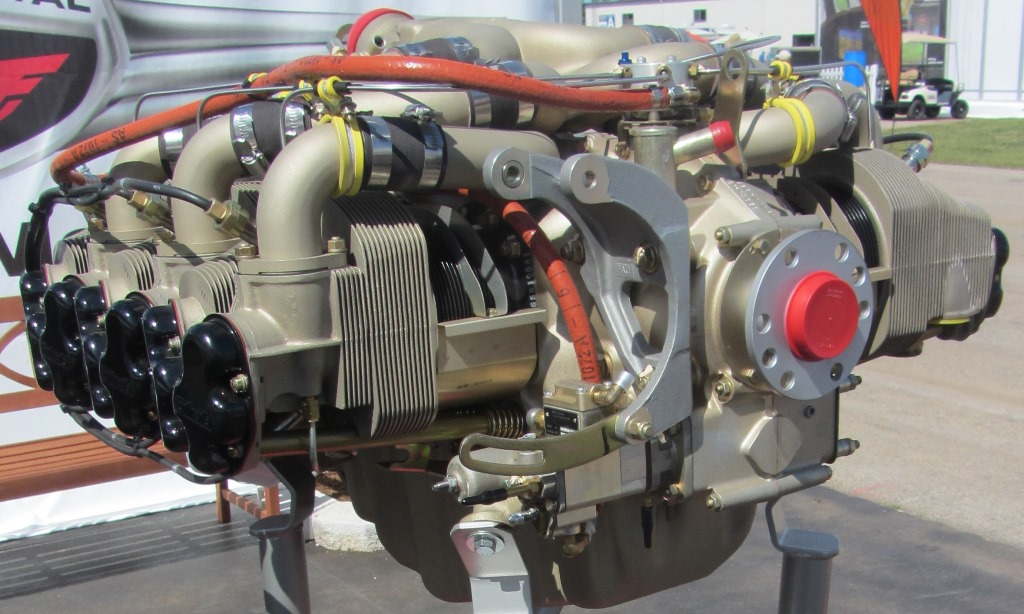
Continental IO-360-AF

IO-360-AF
180 hp (134 kW), designed to run on lower octane fuels such as the proposed 94UL avgas. The designation of "AF" stands for alternative fuel. The version incorporates lower-compression pistons, giving a 7.5 to 1 compression ratio and a revised fuel injection system.
IO-360-B
180 hp (134 kW) at 2700 rpm, Minimum fuel grade 80/87 avgas, compression ratio 6.0:1. Uses a TCM 639230A3 or 6006 fuel injector. Same as IO-360-A except for reduced compression ratio and rated power. The crankshaft has two 6th order dampers.
IO-360-C
210 hp (157 kW) at 2800 rpm, Minimum fuel grade 100 or 100LL avgas, compression ratio 8.5:1. Uses a TCM 639231A3 fuel injector. Same as the IO-360-D except for accessory drive provisions. The crankshaft has two 6th order dampers.
IO-360-CB
210 hp (157 kW) at 2800 rpm, Minimum fuel grade 100 or 100LL avgas, compression ratio 8.5:1. Uses a TCM 639231A3 fuel injector. Same as the IO-360-C except for modified crankshaft. The crankshaft has one 6th and one 4½ order damper.
IO-360-D
210 hp (157 kW) at 2800 rpm, Minimum fuel grade 100 or 100LL avgas, compression ratio 8.5:1. Uses a TCM 639231A3 fuel injector. Same as the IO-360-A except for power rating and oil cooled pistons. The crankshaft has two 6th order dampers.
Rolls-Royce Continental IO-360-D
Licence production in the United Kingdom by Rolls-Royce
IO-360-DB
210 hp (157 kW) at 2800 rpm, Minimum fuel grade 100 or 100LL avgas, compression ratio 8.5:1. Uses a TCM 639231A3 fuel injector. Same as the IO-360-D except for modified crankshaft. The crankshaft has one 6th and one 4½ order damper.
IO-360-E
210 hp (157 kW) at 2800 rpm, Minimum fuel grade 100 or 100LL avgas, compression ratio 8.5:1. Uses a TCM 639231A3 fuel injector. Same as the IO-360-D except for oil sump and suction tube. The crankshaft has two 6th order dampers.

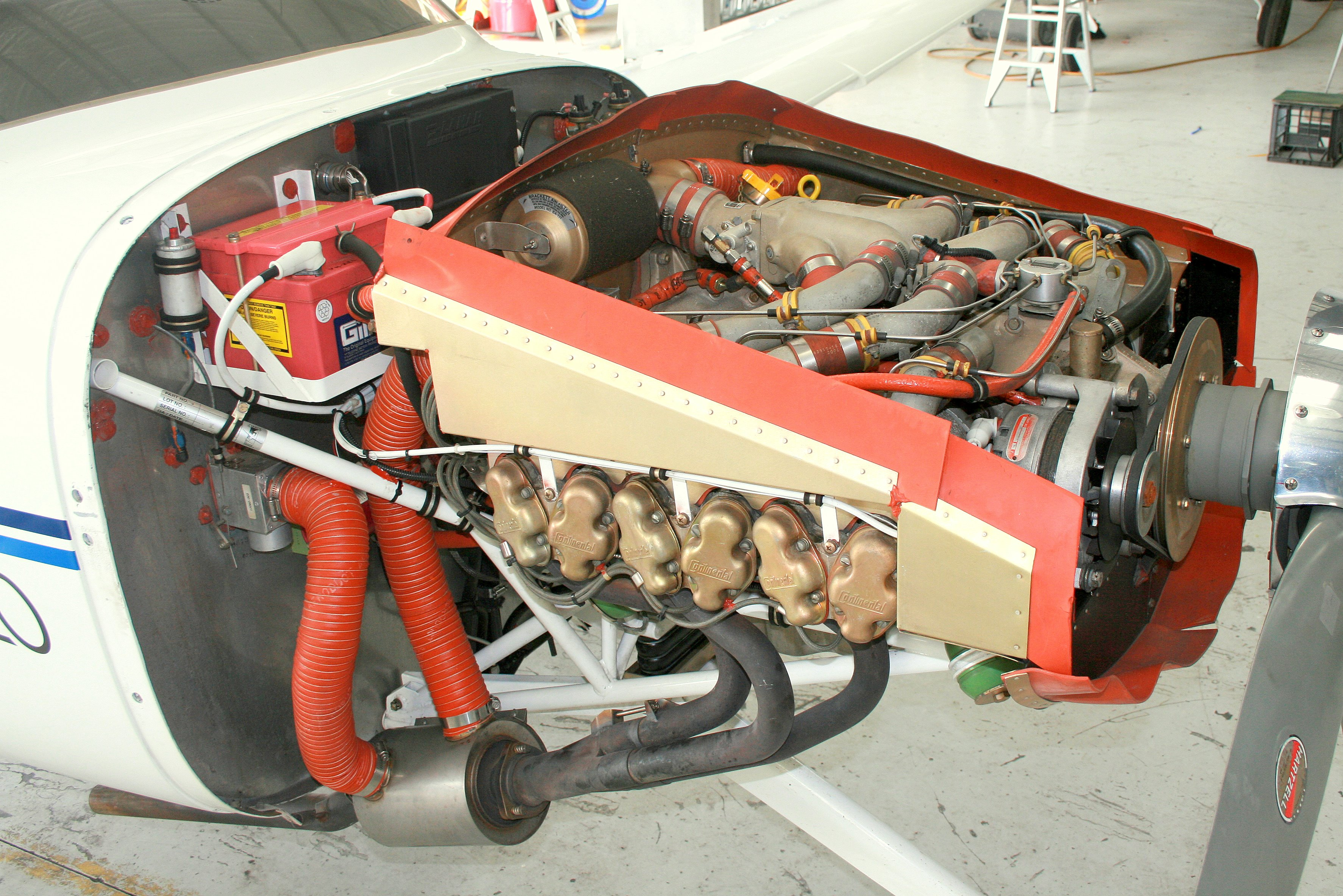
Continental IO-360-ES fitted to a Cirrus SR20

IO-360-ES
210 hp (157 kW) at 2800 rpm, Minimum fuel grade 100 or 100LL avgas, compression ratio 8.5:1. Same as the IO-360-HB except for the modified spider induction system and the use of a TCM 639289A95 fuel injector. The crankshaft has one 6th and one 4½ order damper.
IO-360-G
210 hp (157 kW) at 2800 rpm, Minimum fuel grade 100 or 100LL avgas, compression ratio 8.5:1. Uses a TCM 639231A3 fuel injector. Same as the IO-360-C except for crankshaft counterweight tuning. The crankshaft has one 6th and one 4½ order damper.
IO-360-GB
210 hp (157 kW) at 2800 rpm, Minimum fuel grade 100 or 100LL avgas, compression ratio 8.5:1. Uses a TCM 639231A3 fuel injector. Same as the IO-360-G except for modified crankshaft. The crankshaft has one 6th and one 4½ order damper.
IO-360-H
210 hp (157 kW) at 2800 rpm, Minimum fuel grade 100 or 100LL avgas, compression ratio 8.5:1. Uses a TCM 639231A3 fuel injector. Same as the IO-360-D except for crankshaft counterweight tuning. The crankshaft has one 6th and one 4½ order damper.
IO-360-HB
210 hp (157 kW) at 2800 rpm, Minimum fuel grade 100 or 100LL avgas, compression ratio 8.5:1. Uses a TCM 639231A3 fuel injector. Same as the IO-360-H except for modified crankshaft. The crankshaft has one 6th and one 4½ order damper.
IO-360-J
210 hp (157 kW) at 2800 rpm, Minimum fuel grade 100 or 100LL avgas, compression ratio 8.5:1. Uses a TCM 639231A3 fuel injector. Same as the IO-360-H except for power rating. The crankshaft has one 6th and one 4½ order damper.
IO-360-JB
210 hp (157 kW) at 2800 rpm, Minimum fuel grade 100 or 100LL avgas, compression ratio 8.5:1. Uses a TCM 639231A3 fuel injector. Same as the IO-360-J except for modified crankshaft. The crankshaft has one 6th and one 4½ order damper.
IO-360-K
195 hp (145 kW) at 2600 rpm, Minimum fuel grade 100 or 100LL avgas, compression ratio 8.5:1. Uses a TCM 639231A3 fuel injector. Same as the IO-360-H except for power rating. The crankshaft has one 6th and one 4½ order damper.
IO-360-KB
195 hp (145 kW) at 2600 rpm, Minimum fuel grade 100 or 100LL avgas, compression ratio 8.5:1. Uses a TCM 639231A3 fuel injector. Same as the IO-360-K except for modified crankshaft. The crankshaft has one 6th and one 4½ order damper.

=== TSIO-360 ===
TSIO-360-A
210 hp (157 kW) at 2800 rpm, Minimum fuel grade 100 or 100LL avgas, compression ratio 7.50:1. Base TSIO-360 model: a six-cylinder air-cooled, horizontally opposed direct drive, fuel injected, tuned induction, turbocharged engine with internal piston cooling oil jets.
TSIO-360-AB
210 hp (157 kW) at 2800 rpm, Minimum fuel grade 100 or 100LL avgas, compression ratio 7.50:1. Same as the TSIO-360-A except for a modified crankshaft.
TSIO-360-B
210 hp (157 kW) at 2800 rpm, Minimum fuel grade 100 or 100LL avgas, compression ratio 7.50:1. Same as the TSIO-360-A except for accessory drive provisions.
TSIO-360-BB
210 hp (157 kW) at 2800 rpm, Minimum fuel grade 100 or 100LL avgas, compression ratio 7.50:1. Same as the TSIO-360-B except for modified crankshaft and different dampers.
TSIO-360-C
225 hp (168 kW) at 2800 rpm, Minimum fuel grade 100 or 100LL avgas, compression ratio 7.50:1. Same as the TSIO-360-A except for rating, crankshaft dampers provision for cabin pressurization.
TSIO-360-CB
225 hp (168 kW) at 2800 rpm, Minimum fuel grade 100 or 100LL avgas, compression ratio 7.50:1. Same as the TSIO-360-C except for a modified crankshaft.
TSIO-360-D
225 hp (168 kW) at 2800 rpm, Minimum fuel grade 100 or 100LL avgas, compression ratio 7.50:1. Same as the TSIO-360-C except for cabin pressurization.
TSIO-360-DB
225 hp (168 kW) at 2800 rpm, Minimum fuel grade 100 or 100LL avgas, compression ratio 7.50:1. Same as the TSIO-360-D except for a modified crankshaft.
TSIO-360-E
215 hp (160 kW) at 2575 rpm, Minimum fuel grade 100 or 100LL avgas, compression ratio 7.50:1. Same as the TSIO-360-C except for rating, engine mounted turbocharger, freon compressor drive and cabin pressurization.
TSIO-360-EB
215 hp (160 kW) at 2575 rpm, Minimum fuel grade 100 or 100LL avgas, compression ratio 7.50:1. Same as the TSIO-360-E except for a modified crankshaft.
TSIO-360-F
200 hp (149 kW) at 2575 rpm, Minimum fuel grade 100 or 100LL avgas, compression ratio 7.50:1. Same as the TSIO-360-E except for the power output rating and the exhaust system configuration.
TSIO-360-FB
200 hp (149 kW) at 2575 rpm, Minimum fuel grade 100 or 100LL avgas, compression ratio 7.50:1. Same as the TSIO-360-F except for a modified crankshaft.
TSIO-360-G
210 hp (157 kW) at 2700 rpm, Minimum fuel grade 100 or 100LL avgas, compression ratio 7.50:1. Same as the TSIO-360-E except for the power output rating and the exhaust system configuration.
TSIO-360-GB
210 hp (157 kW) at 2700 rpm, Minimum fuel grade 100 or 100LL avgas, compression ratio 7.50:1. Same as the TSIO-360-G except for a modified crankshaft.
TSIO-360-H
210 hp (157 kW) at 2800 rpm, Minimum fuel grade 100 or 100LL avgas, compression ratio 7.50:1. Same as the TSIO-360-G except for rating and cabin pressurization.
TSIO-360-HB
210 hp (157 kW) at 2800 rpm, Minimum fuel grade 100 or 100LL avgas, compression ratio 7.50:1. Same as the TSIO-360-H except for a modified crankshaft.
TSIO-360-JB
225 hp (168 kW) at 2800 rpm, Minimum fuel grade 100 or 100LL avgas, compression ratio 7.50:1. Same as the TSIO-360-HB except for the increased power output rating.
TSIO-360-KB
220 hp (164 kW) at 2800 rpm, Minimum fuel grade 100 or 100LL avgas, compression ratio 7.50:1. Same as the TSIO-360-EB except for the increased power output rating.
TSIO-360-LB
210 hp (157 kW) at 2700 rpm, Minimum fuel grade 100 or 100LL avgas, compression ratio 7.50:1. Same as the TSIO-360-GB but with a larger throttle body, larger induction elbows, relocated overboost valve, magneto pressurization and an exhaust muffler.
TSIO-360-MB
210 hp (157 kW) at 36" mp and 2700 rpm, Minimum fuel grade 100 or 100LL avgas, compression ratio 7.50:1. Same as the TSIO-360-LB except for intercooler, wastegate controller, maximum manifold pressure, and cluster manifold.
TSIO-360-NB
210 hp (157 kW) at 2700 rpm, Minimum fuel grade 100 or 100LL avgas, compression ratio 7.50:1. Same as the TSIO-360-LB except for an intercooler.
TSIO-360-PB
200 hp (149 kW) at 2600 rpm, Minimum fuel grade 100 or 100LL avgas, compression ratio 7.50:1. Same as the TSIO-360-MB but not equipped with an intercooler.
TSIO-360-RB
220 hp (164 kW) at 2600 rpm, Minimum fuel grade 100 or 100LL avgas, RH95/130 or B95/130 CIS, compression ratio 7.50:1. Same as the TSIO-360-KB except the manifold pressure is controlled with a wastegate controller, an intercooler is installed in the induction system, and uses a Precision Airmotive RSA-5AD2 fuel injection servo.
TSIO-360-SB
220 hp (164 kW) at 39" mp and 2600 rpm, Minimum fuel grade 100 or 100LL avgas, compression ratio 7.50:1. Same as the TSIO-360-MB except for the manifold pressure, RPM, and power output rating.

=== LTSIO-360 ===
LTSIO-360-E
215 hp (160 kW) at 2575 rpm, Minimum fuel grade 100 or 100LL avgas, compression ratio 7.50:1. Same as the TSIO-360-E except for direction of rotation.
LTSIO-360-EB
215 hp (160 kW) at 2575 rpm, Minimum fuel grade 100 or 100LL avgas, compression ratio 7.50:1. Same as the LTSIO-360-E except for a modified crankshaft.
LTSIO-360-KB
220 hp (164 kW) at 2800 rpm, Minimum fuel grade 100 or 100LL avgas, compression ratio 7.50:1. Same as the LTSIO-360-EB except for the increased power output rating.
LTSIO-360-RB
220 hp (164 kW) at 2600 rpm, Minimum fuel grade 100 or 100LL avgas, RH95/130 or B95/130 CIS, compression ratio 7.50:1. Same as the TSIO-360-RB except for direction of rotation.

== Applications ==
- Aero Boero AB-210
- AVE Mizar
- Beriev Be-103
- Cessna 160
- Cessna R172
- Cessna Skymaster and military O-2 Skymaster
- Cirrus SR20
- Cierva CR Twin
- Flight Design C4
- Goodyear GZ-20
- Ilyushin Il-103
- Irkut A-002
- Maule M-4
- Maule M-5
- Mooney M20
- PAC CT/4
- Piper PA-28R-201T Turbo Arrow
- Piper PA-28-201T Turbo Dakota
- Piper PA-34 Seneca
- PZL M-20 Mewa
- Reims FR172 Reims Rocket
- Ryan XV-8
- Sasin Spraymaster
- T-41 Mescalero
- White Lightning WLAC-1

== Specifications (IO-360-A) ==
Data from TYPE CERTIFICATE DATA SHEET NO. E1CE

=== General characteristics ===
- Type: 6-cylinder, fuel injected, horizontally opposed, piston engine
- Bore: 4.438 (112 mm)
- Stroke: 3.875 (98 mm)
- Displacement: 360 in³ (5.90 L)
- Dry weight: 294 lb (133 kg)

=== Components ===
- Fuel type: minimum 100LL Avgas

=== Performance ===
- Power output: 195 hp (145 kW) at 2,800 rpm continuous, 210 hp (157 kW) at 2,800 rpm for take-off
- Compression ratio: 8.5:1
- Power-to-weight ratio: 0.71 hp/lb

== See also ==
- List of aircraft engines
