= Rowley P-40F =

American homebuilt aircraft

P-40F
- the sole example of the Rowley P-40F

General information
- Type: Homebuilt aircraft
- National origin: United States
- Manufacturer: 76th Fighter Squadron Inc
- Designer: Richard J Rowley
- Status: Sole example destroyed in 2000; Plans no longer available
- Number built: One

History
- First flight: 1986
- Developed from: Curtiss P-40 Warhawk

The Rowley P-40F was an American homebuilt aircraft that was designed by Richard J Rowley and marketed by his company 76th Fighter Squadron Inc, of Meadow Lake Airport, Colorado, first flown in 1986. When it was available the aircraft was supplied in the form of plans for amateur construction.

The Rowley P-40F was a 3/4 scale replica of the Second World War Curtiss P-40 Warhawk.

The company, 76th Fighter Squadron Inc, was named for the 76th Fighter Squadron, formerly a Flying Tigers unit flying P-40s.

== Design and development ==
The P-40F featured a cantilever low wing, a single-seat enclosed cockpit under a sliding canopy, conventional landing gear and a single engine in tractor configuration. The aircraft was capable of aerobatics.

The aircraft fuselage was made from welded 4130 steel tubing, covered in sheet 2024-T3 aluminum. The 28.00 ft (8.5 m) span wings were made with a spruce wood box spar, with an aluminum front shear and had a wing area of 128.0 sq ft (11.89 m^{2}). The acceptable power range was 95 to 125 hp (71 to 93 kW) and the original engine used was a 100 hp (75 kW) 2si 808, later replaced with a Rotax powerplant.

The P-40F prototype had an empty weight of 750 lb (340 kg) and a gross weight of 1,200 lb (540 kg), giving a useful load of 450 lb (200 kg). With full fuel of 22 U.S. gallons (83 L; 18 imp gal) the payload for the pilot and baggage was 318 lb (144 kg).

The standard day, sea level, no-wind takeoff with a 100 hp (75 kW) engine was 800 ft (244 m) and the landing roll was 700 ft (213 m).

== Operational history ==
On Sunday, 2 July 2000 in Peyton, Colorado the prototype and sole example, registered N42915, crashed, killing the designer/builder of the aircraft. The National Transportation Safety Board summarized the events: "The pilot was performing a low fly-by over runway 33, and as the airplane reached the departure end, the engine lost power. Witnesses said that the pilot made a left turn back towards runway 15. Subsequently the airplane hit wires, impacted terrain, cart wheeled, came to rest against a transmission pole, and burned. Post accident examination of the engine revealed that the gear reduction assembly had failed. The pilot had designed and built the airplane in 1986." The NTSB assigned cause factors: "the pilot's inadequate decision to turn back (low altitude) towards the runway for a forced landing. A contributing factor was the total loss of engine power due to a reduction gear failure."

The sole example's Federal Aviation Administration registration in the United States expired on 30 September 2013.

== Specifications (P-40F) ==
Data from AeroCrafter

General characteristics

- Crew: one
- Length: 23 ft 0 in (7.01 m)
- Wingspan: 28 ft 0 in (8.53 m)
- Wing area: 128.0 sq ft (11.89 m^{2})
- Empty weight: 750 lb (340 kg)
- Gross weight: 1,200 lb (544 kg)
- Fuel capacity: 22 U.S. gallons (83 L; 18 imp gal)
- Powerplant: 1 × 2si 808 in-line three cylinder, liquid-cooled, two-stroke, dual ignition, aircraft engine, 100 hp (75 kW)
- Propellers: 2-bladed wooden fixed pitch

Performance

- Maximum speed: 120 mph (190 km/h, 100 kn)
- Cruise speed: 110 mph (180 km/h, 96 kn)
- Stall speed: 48 mph (77 km/h, 42 kn)
- Range: 403 mi (649 km, 350 nmi)
- Service ceiling: 16,000 ft (4,900 m)
- Rate of climb: 1,600 ft/min (8.1 m/s)
- Wing loading: 9.4 lb/sq ft (46 kg/m^{2})

== See also ==
- List of aerobatic aircraft
