= Reflex Fiberglass Works =

American aircraft and boat manufacturer

- Company type: Privately held company
- Industry: Aerospace and boat building
- Founded: 1996
- Founder: Howell C. Jones
- Fate: Out of business
- Products: Boats, kit aircraft
- Owner: Howell C. Jones

Reflex Fiberglass Works was an American aircraft and boat manufacturer based in Walterboro, South Carolina and founded in 1996. The company specialized in the design and manufacture of fiberglass structures including kit aircraft.

The company was out of business by the mid-2000s.

== Aircraft ==
Aircraft built by Reflex Fiberglass Works
Model name	First flight	Number built	Type
Reflex Lightning Bug	1990s	at least 9	Fiberglass kit aircraft
White Lightning WLAC-1	1990s	more than 10	Fiberglass kit aircraft
