= Podlaski Border Guard Regional Unit =

Podlaski Border Guard Regional Unit Podlaski Oddział Straży Granicznej

Agency overview
- Formed: May 16, 1991

Jurisdictional structure
- Operations jurisdiction: Poland
- Area: 351.21 km (218.23 mi)
- Specialist jurisdiction: National border patrol, security, integrity

Operational structure
- Headquarters: 100 Bema Street, Białystok
- Parent agency: Polish Border Guard

Facilities
- Stations: Yes
- Lockups: Yes
- Patrol cars: Yes
- Dogs: Yes

Website
- www.podlaski.strazgraniczna.pl

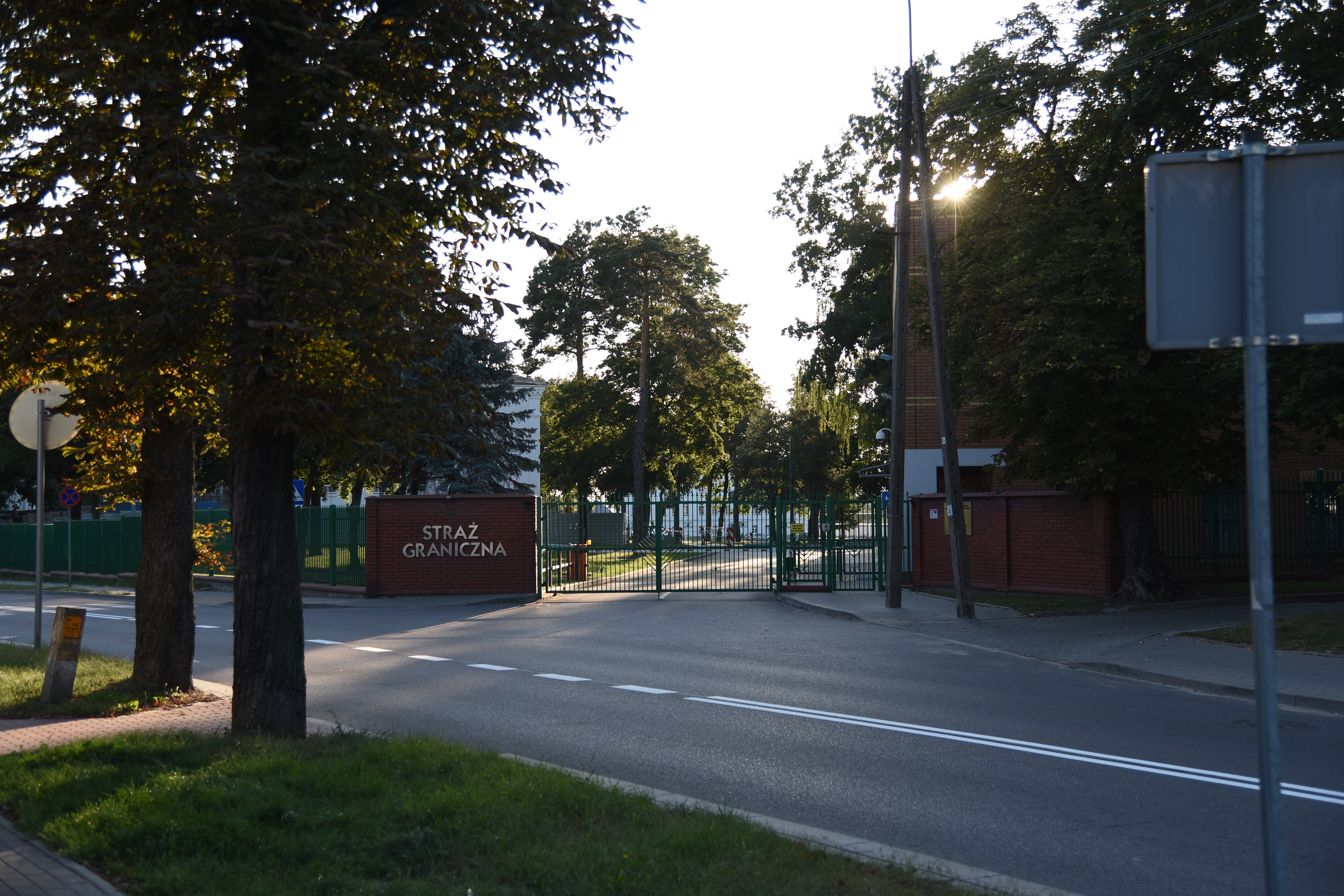
Podlaski Border Guard Regional Unit

Podlaski Border Guard Regional Unit of the Polish Border Guard (Polish: Podlaski Oddział Straży Granicznej imienia gen. dyw. Henryka Minkiewicza) is one of the ten regional units of the Polish Border Guard (Straż Graniczna), responsible for the protection of the borders of Poland.

== History ==
The creation of the Border Guard Department in Białystok began in February 1991. On February 14, 1991, the Border Guard Chief Commander Col. prof. Marek Lisiecki issued Regulation No. 6/91, pursuant to which the Border Guard Branch in Białystok was created, which was entrusted with the protection of a section of the state border from the 1988 border mark, constituting a demarcation with the section of the official responsibility of the Border Guard branch in Kętrzyn, to the border mark No. 1346 delimitation with the SG Branch in Chełm

By Special Order No. Pf-30 of February 18, 1991, the Commander-in-Chief of the Border Guard gave the name of "Podlaski Border Guard Department" with the place of stationing in Białystok on February 15, 1991.

Order No. 019 of the Border Guard Commander-in-Chief of April 30, 1991 regarding the organization of the SG Branch in Chełm and the reorganization of the SG Branches in Białystok and Przemyśl in May 1991, the decision was made to shorten the section of the branch to the Bug River line in the south. Following this decision, border organizational units in Janów Podlaski, Terespol and Sławatycze were transferred to the Bug Border Guard Regional Unit in Chełm.

On May 7, 1991, the Commander of the Border Guard, Col. prof. Marek Lisiecki issued ordinance No. 021 pursuant to which on May 16, 1991 the Podlasie-Masurian Brigade of the Border Protection Troops in Białystok and the Border Inspectorate of the Podlasko-Mazurian Brigade of the Border Protection Troops in Terespol were dissolved. At the same time, pursuant to this ordinance, the Podlaski Border Guard Regional Unit in Bialystok was created according to order No. 44/015 containing with 952 officers and 70 employees of state offices.

== Sources ==
- Jan Nikołajuk: Reorganizacja formacji granicznej na przykładzie oddziału w Białymstoku in T. Z historii Ochrony Granic
