= Piper PA-34 Seneca =

Twin engine light aircraft

PA-34 Seneca
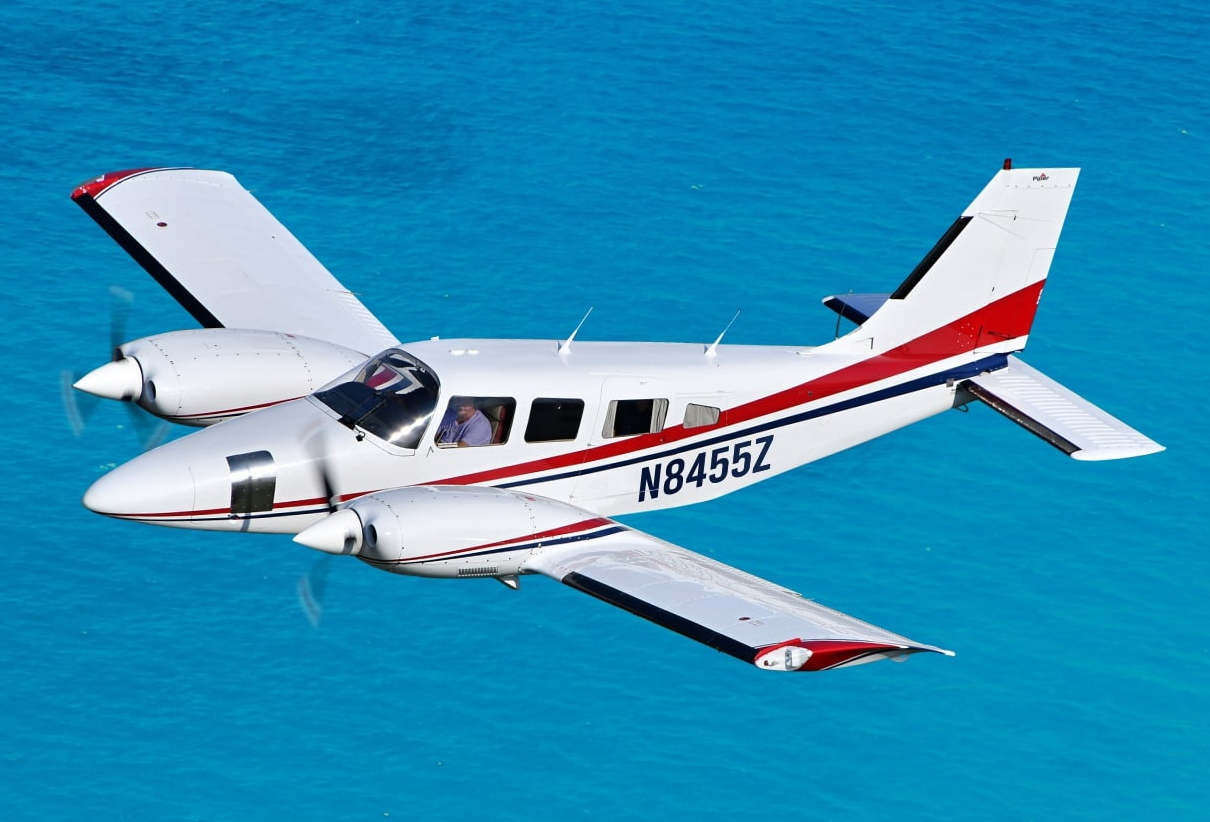
- Piper PA-34-220T Seneca

General information
- Type: Business and personal aircraft
- National origin: United States
- Manufacturer: Piper Aircraft
- Number built: 5,037

History
- Manufactured: 1971–2019
- Introduction date: 1971
- First flight: 25 April 1967
- Developed from: Piper Cherokee Six
- Variant: PZL M-20 Mewa

The Piper PA-34 Seneca is a twin-engined light aircraft, produced in the United States by Piper Aircraft. It was produced from 1971 to 2019. The Seneca is primarily used for personal and business flying as well as multi-engine class rating flight training.

== Development ==
The Seneca was developed as a twin-engined version of the Piper Cherokee Six. The prototype was a Cherokee Six that had wing-mounted engines installed, retaining its nose engine. The prototype was flown as a tri-motor aircraft in the initial stages of the test-flying program.

=== PA-34-180 Twin Six ===
With the decision to abandon the three-engined design tested on the PA-32-3M, the PA-34 was developed as a twin-engined aircraft. The prototype PA-34-180 Twin Six, registered as N3401K, first flew on 25 April 1967. The prototype had two 180 hp (134 kW) Lycoming O-360 engines, a fixed nosewheel landing gear and a Cherokee Six vertical tail. The second prototype flew on 30 August 1968, still with the 180 hp (134 kW) Lycomings but had retractable landing gear and a taller vertical tail. During development flying the wingspan was increased by two feet. The third prototype was closer to the production standard and flew on 20 October 1969; it was fitted with 200 hp (149 kW) Lycoming IO-360-A1A engines.

=== PA-34-200 Seneca ===
Certified on 7 May 1971 and introduced in late 1971 as a 1972 model, the PA-34-200 Seneca is powered by a pair of Lycoming IO-360-C1E6 engines. The righthand engine is a Lycoming LIO-360-C1E6 engine variant, the "L" in its designation indicating that the crankshaft turns in the opposite direction, giving the Seneca counter-rotating engines. The counter-rotating engines eliminate the critical engine limitations of other light twins and make the aircraft more controllable in the event of a shut down or failure of either engine. A total of 934 Seneca models were built, including one prototype.

The early Seneca models have a maximum gross weight of 4,000 lb (1,810 kg), while later serial numbers allowed a takeoff weight of 4,200 lb (1,910 kg).

=== PA-34-200T Seneca II ===
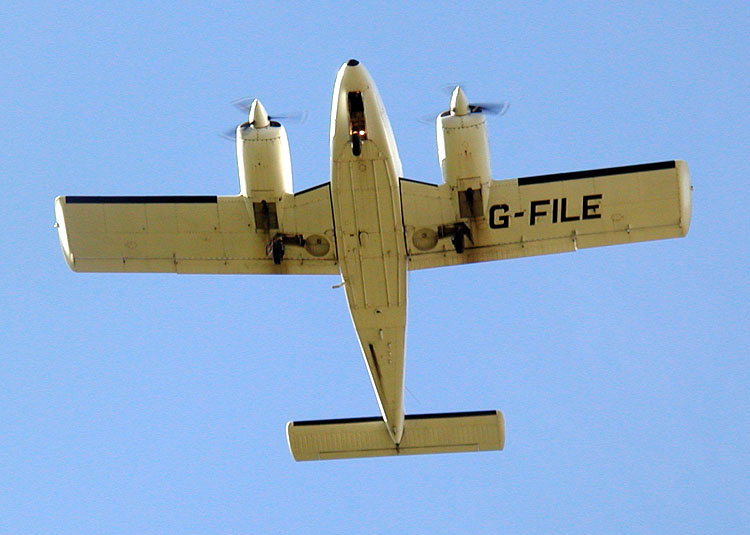
A Piper Seneca II

Responding to complaints about the aircraft's handling qualities, Piper introduced the PA-34-200T Seneca II. The aircraft was certified on 18 July 1974 and introduced as a 1975 model.

The new model incorporated changes in the aircraft's control surfaces, including enlarged and balanced ailerons, the addition of a rudder anti-servo tab, and a stabilator bobweight.

The "T" in the new model designation reflected a change to turbocharged, six-cylinder Continental TSIO-360E or EB engines for improved performance, particularly at higher altitudes. The Seneca II retained the counter-rotating engine arrangement of the earlier Seneca I.

The Seneca II also introduced optional "club seating" whereby the two center-row seats face rearwards and the two back seats face forward allowing more legroom in the passenger cabin. A total of 2,588 Seneca IIs were built.

Gross weights are 4,570 lb (2,070 kg) for takeoff and 4,342 lb (1,969 kg) for landing, with all weight in excess of 4,000 lb (1,800 kg) required to be fuel.

=== PA-34-220T Seneca III ===
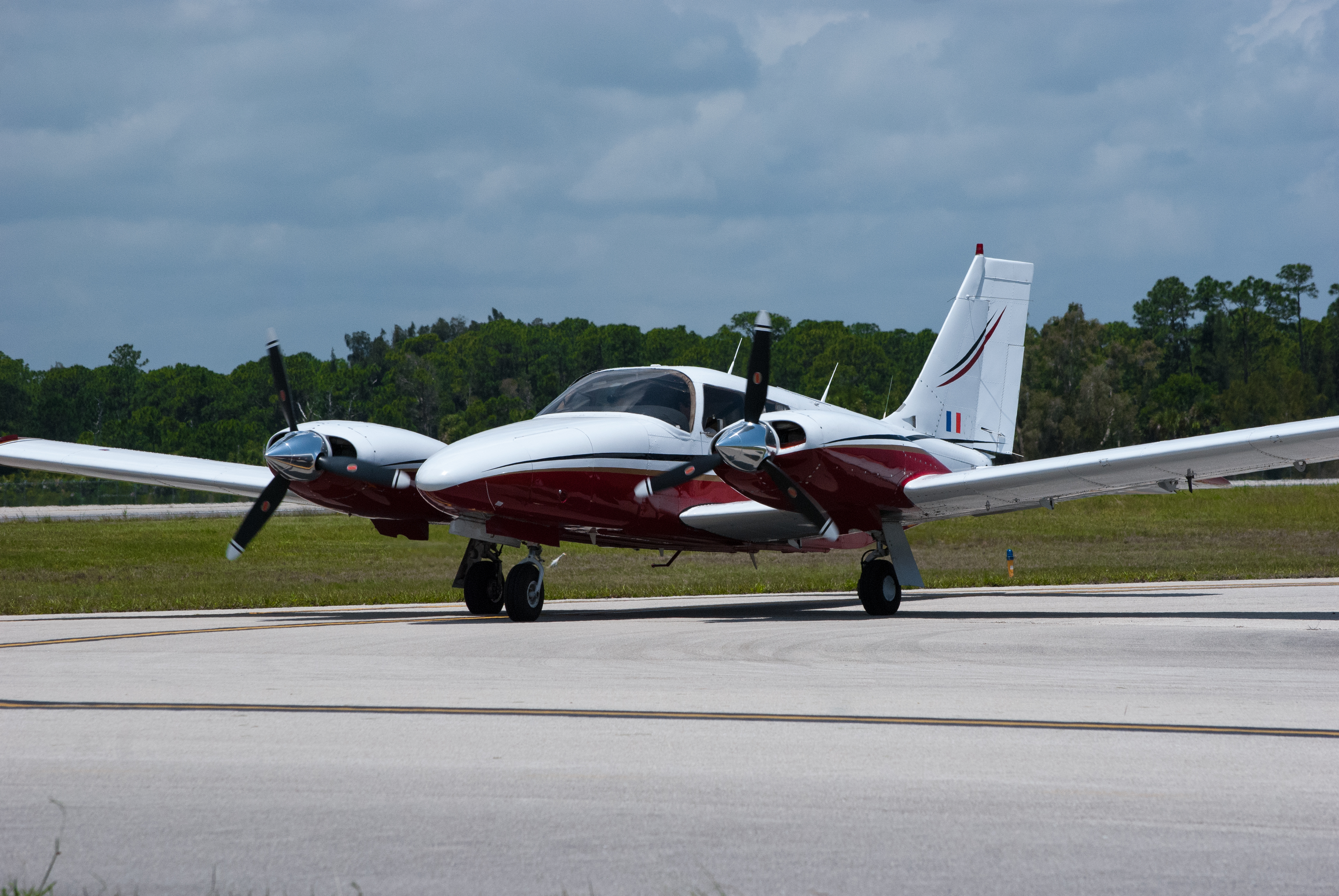
Piper Seneca III showing the one piece windshield

In 1981, the PA-34-220T Seneca III was introduced, having completed certification on 17 December 1980.

The change in model designation reflected an engine upgrade. Continental TSIO-360-KB engines were used which produced 220 horsepower (165 kW), although only rated as such for five minutes and then dropping to 200 hp (149 kW).

The horsepower increase, with the new engines limit of 2800 rpm (up from 2575 rpm), combined for much improved climb and cruise performance. The new aircraft also incorporated a one-piece windshield and a bare metal instrument panel instead of one covered with a removable plastic fascia. Because of the raised zero-fuel weight and the raised maximum take-off weight, the Seneca III has the highest useful load of all the PA-34 variants. Some later models have electrically actuated flaps. More than 930 Seneca IIIs were built; the last 37 Seneca IIIs built had a 28-volt electrical system rather than the 14-volt system of previous aircraft.

The aircraft's gross weight was increased to 4,750 lb (2,155 kg) for takeoff and 4,513 lb (2,047 kg) for landing. A typical Seneca III with air conditioning and deicing equipment has a useful load of 1,377 lb (625 kg).

=== PA-34-220T Seneca IV ===
In 1994, the "New" Piper Aircraft company introduced the Seneca IV, having achieved certification on 17 November 1993. This model was similar to the Seneca III offering minor improvements, such as a streamlined engine cowl for increased cruise performance. It continued to use the counter-rotating Continental TSIO-360-KB engines and gross weights remained unchanged. A total of 71 Seneca IVs were built.

=== PA-34-220T Seneca V ===
Two examples of Seneca V

Certified on 11 December 1996, the Seneca V was put into production as a 1997 model year. Again the cowls were redesigned for increased performance, several cockpit switches were relocated from the panel to the headliner, and an improved engine variant, the Continental TSIO-360-RB, fitted with an intercooler, was used.

The Seneca V's gross weights remain the same as the Seneca III and IV at 4,750 lb (2,155 kg) for takeoff and 4,513 lb (2,047 kg) for landing, therefore, with all of the added features, the useful load is reduced by about 200 lb (91 kg). The standard useful load for the 2014 model is 1,331 lb (604 kg) but typically is 1,134 lb (514 kg) when the aircraft is equipped with air conditioning, deicing equipment and co-pilot instruments.

=== Embraer EMB-810 Seneca ===
From 1975 the Seneca was built under licence in Brazil by Embraer as the EMB-810. The PA-34-200T was produced as the EMB-810C Seneca (452 built) and the PA-34-220T as the EMB-810D (228 built). The EMB-810C is designated U-7 in Brazilian Air Force service.

== Operators ==
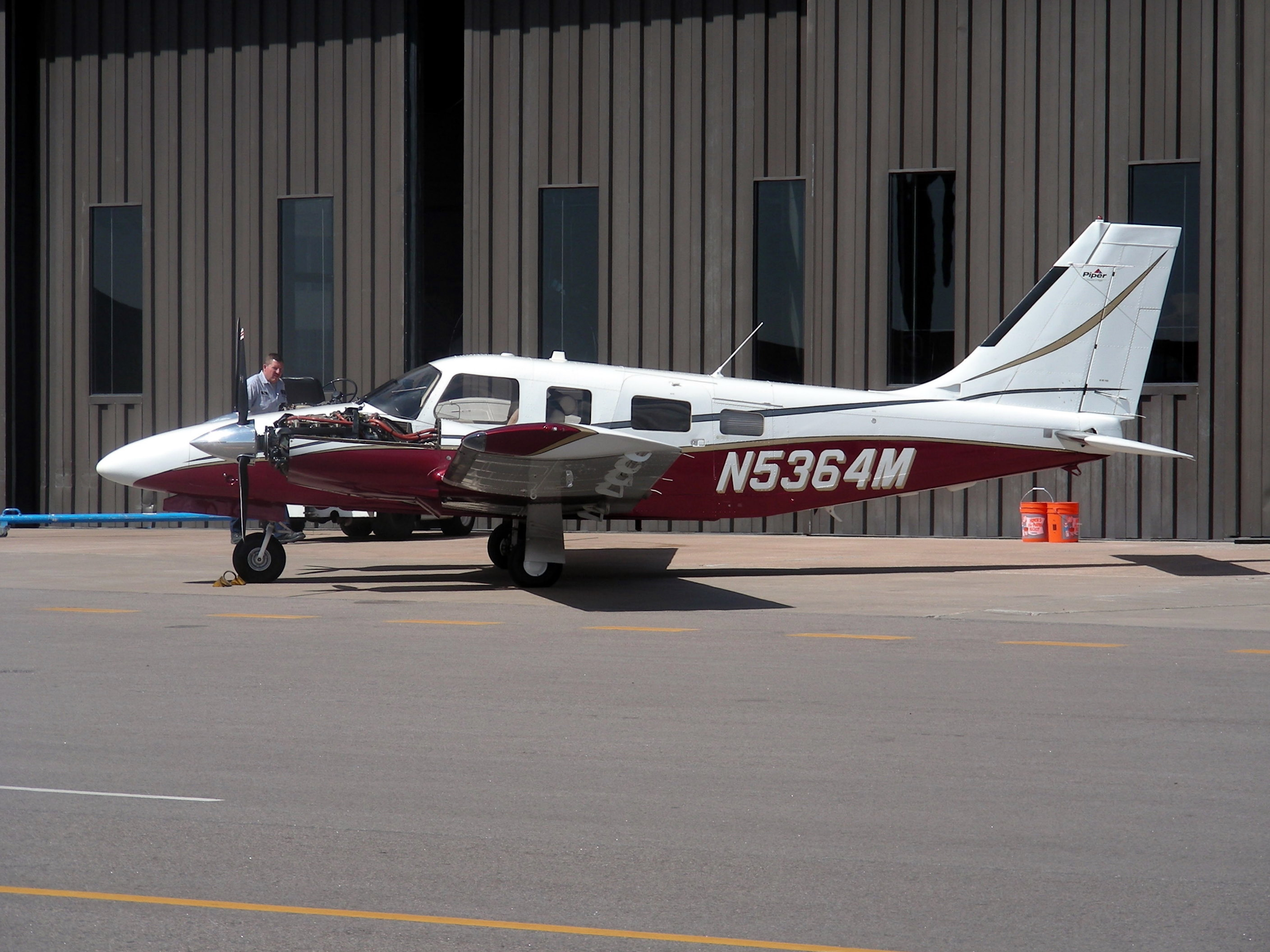
A Piper Seneca II with the engine cowl removed

=== Civil ===
The aircraft is popular with air charter companies and small feeder airlines, and is operated by private individuals and companies. One notable civil operator is Eid Air Aviation, a flight school located in Bromont, Canada

=== Military ===
Brazil

- Brazilian Air Force (EMB 810C Seneca)

Belize

- Belize Defence Force Air Wing

Colombia

- Colombian Aerospace Force
- National Army of Colombia

Dominican Republic

- Dominican Air Force

Ecuador

- Ecuadorian Air Force

Honduras

- Honduran Air Force

Indonesia

- Indonesian Navy

Panama

- Panamanian Public Forces

Peru

- Peruvian Air Force

Serbia

- Serbian Air Force (PA-34-220T Seneca V)

== Notable accidents and incidents ==
- On 2 August 1978 a Seneca carrying Richard D. Obenshain home from an election campaign event crashed while attempting a night-time landing at the Chesterfield County Airport (a general aviation airport near Richmond, Virginia), killing Obenshain and the other two people on board.
- On 30 January 2009 a Piper PA-34-200T Seneca crashed near KHTS in a snowstorm. The pilot was trying to divert to KHTS due to a fuel emergency; all six aboard were killed.
- On 18 August 2012 a PA-34-200 Seneca crashed off the coast of Masbate, Philippines, killing Philippine Interior and Local Government Secretary Jesse Robredo.

== Specifications (PA-34-220T Seneca V) ==
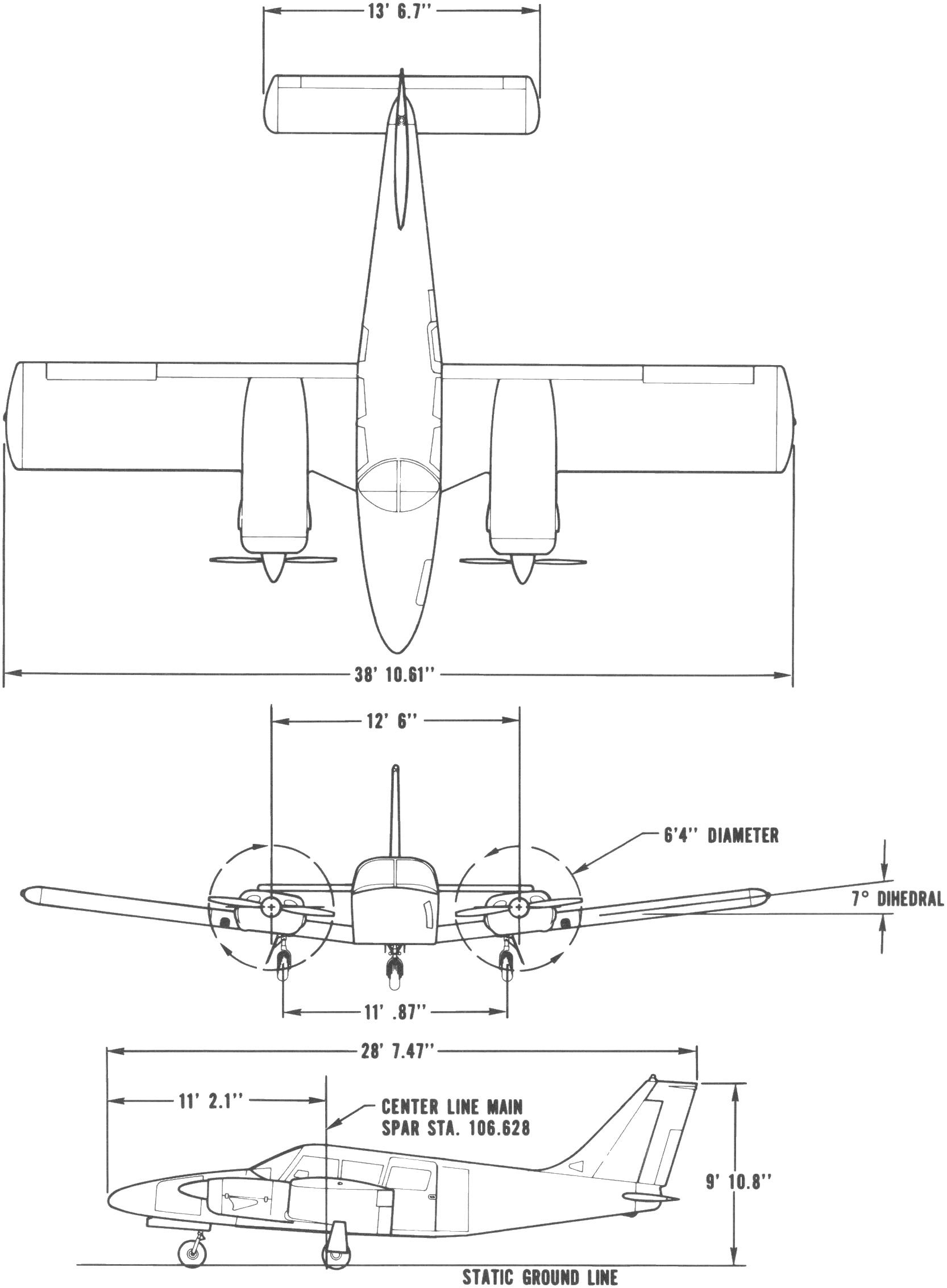
3-view line drawing of the Piper PA-34-200 Seneca

Data from Piper Seneca V Information Manual (October 25, 2005)

General characteristics

- Crew: One
- Capacity: Five or six passengers
- Length: 28 ft 7.44 in (8.72 m)
- Wingspan: 38 ft 10.87 in (11.86 m)
- Height: 9 ft 10.8 in (3.02 m)
- Wing area: 208.7 sq ft (19.39 m^{2})
- Airfoil: laminar flow NACA 652-415
- Empty weight: 3,212 lb (1,457 kg)
- Gross weight: 4,773 lb (2,165 kg)
- Max takeoff weight: 4,750 lb (2,155 kg)
- Powerplant: 2 × Continental TSIO-360RB and LTSIO-360RB 6-cylinder, air-cooled, horizontally-opposed piston engine, 220 hp (164 kW) each

Performance

- Maximum speed: 204 kn (235 mph, 378 km/h) at 23,000 ft (7,000 m)
- Cruise speed: 188 kn (216 mph, 348 km/h) econ cruise at 25,000 ft (7,600 m)
- Stall speed: 61 kn (70 mph, 113 km/h) wheels and flaps down
- Never exceed speed: 204 kn (235 mph, 378 km/h)
- Range: 870 nmi (1,000 mi, 1,611 km) max fuel, econ cruise at 18,000 ft (5,500 m), no reserves
- Service ceiling: 25,000 ft (7,620 m)
- Rate of climb: 1,550 ft/min (7.87 m/s)
- Wing loading: 21.2 lb/sq ft (104 kg/m^{2})
- Power/mass: 0.1 hp/lb (164 W/kg)

== See also ==
Related development

- PZL M-20 Mewa

Aircraft of comparable role, configuration, and era

- Beechcraft Baron
- Cessna 310

Related lists

- List of civil aircraft
