= Reflex Lightning Bug =

American homebuilt aircraft

Lightning Bug
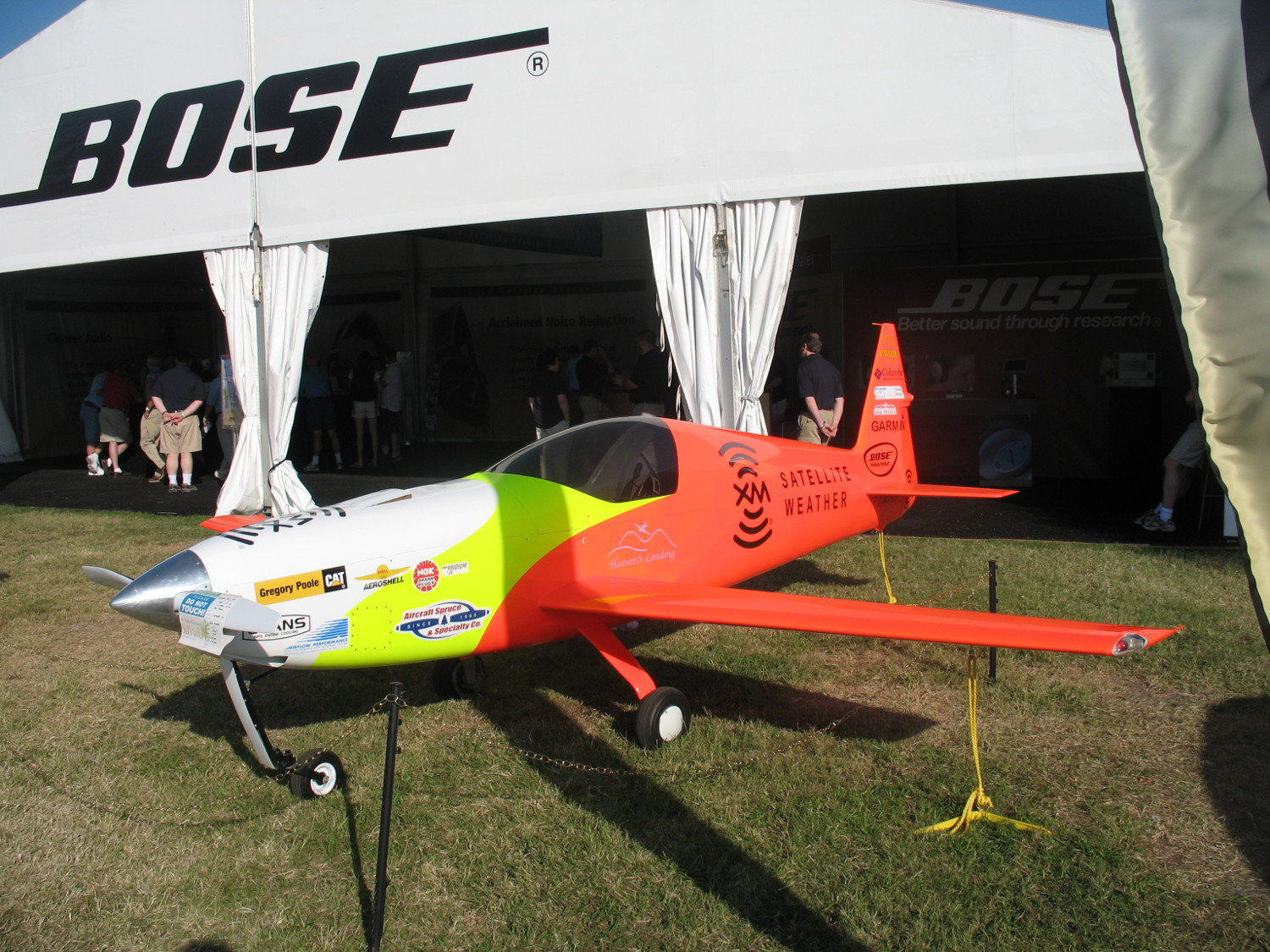
- Reflex Lightning Bug 2 at Sun-N-Fun 2007

General information
- Type: Homebuilt aircraft
- National origin: United States
- Manufacturer: Reflex Fiberglass Works
- Designer: Nick Jones
- Status: Production completed
- Number built: At least nine

History
- Introduction date: 1990s

The Reflex Lightning Bug, also called the Jones Lightning Bug, is an American homebuilt aircraft that was designed by Nick Jones and produced by Reflex Fiberglass Works of Walterboro, South Carolina, introduced in the mid-1990s. When it was available the aircraft was supplied as a kit for amateur construction.

== Design and development ==
The Lightning Bug features a cantilever low-wing, a single-seat enclosed cockpit under a bubble canopy, fixed tricycle landing gear with wheel pants, a retractable nose wheel and a single engine in tractor configuration.

The aircraft is made from a combination of stainless steel and fiberglass. Its 17.83 ft (5.4 m) span wing has a wing area of 40.00 sq ft (3.716 m^{2}). The cabin width is 25 in (64 cm). The standard engine used is the 100 hp (75 kW) AMW 808 in-line three cylinder, liquid-cooled, two-stroke, dual ignition, aircraft engine. With that engine the aircraft can cruise at 225 mph (362 km/h).

The Lightning Bug has a typical empty weight of 475 lb (215 kg) and a gross weight of 800 lb (360 kg), giving a useful load of 325 lb (147 kg). With full fuel of 23 U.S. gallons (87 L; 19 imp gal) the payload for the pilot and baggage is 187 lb (85 kg). The aircraft meets American FAR 23 aerobatic category requirements at a gross weight of 750 lb (340 kg).

The standard day, sea level, no wind, take off with a 100 hp (75 kW) engine is 800 ft (244 m) and the landing roll is 1,000 ft (305 m), due to its 62 mph (100 km/h) stall speed.

The manufacturer estimated the construction time from the supplied kit as 300 hours.

== Operational history ==
In February 2014 two examples were registered in the United States with the Federal Aviation Administration, although a total of nine had been registered at one time.

== Specifications (Lightning Bug) ==
Data from AeroCrafter

General characteristics

- Crew: one
- Length: 17 ft 5.5 in (5.321 m)
- Wingspan: 17 ft 10 in (5.44 m)
- Wing area: 40.00 sq ft (3.716 m^{2})
- Empty weight: 475 lb (215 kg)
- Gross weight: 800 lb (363 kg)
- Fuel capacity: 23 U.S. gallons (87 L; 19 imp gal)
- Powerplant: 1 × AMW 808 in-line three cylinder, liquid-cooled, two-stroke, dual ignition, aircraft engine, 100 hp (75 kW)
- Propellers: 2-bladed wooden, fixed pitch

Performance

- Maximum speed: 250 mph (400 km/h, 220 kn)
- Cruise speed: 225 mph (362 km/h, 196 kn)
- Stall speed: 62 mph (100 km/h, 54 kn)
- Range: 880 mi (1,420 km, 760 nmi)
- Service ceiling: 20,000 ft (6,100 m)
- Rate of climb: 1,200 ft/min (6.1 m/s)
- Wing loading: 20.0 lb/sq ft (98 kg/m^{2})

== See also ==
- List of aerobatic aircraft
