= Percolation trench =

Drainage structure

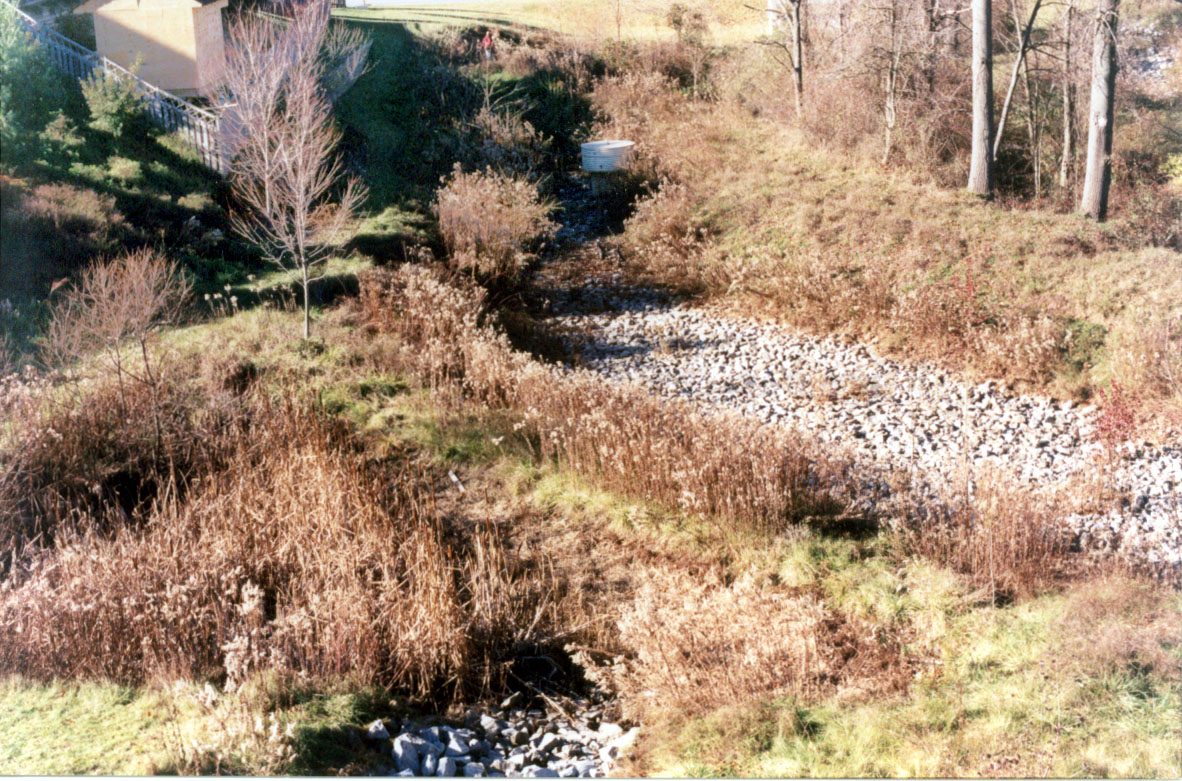
Percolation Trench

A percolation trench, also called an infiltration trench, is a type of best management practice (BMP) that is used to manage stormwater runoff, prevent flooding and downstream erosion, and improve water quality in an adjacent river, stream, lake or bay. It is a shallow excavated trench filled with gravel or crushed stone that is designed to infiltrate stormwater though permeable soils into the groundwater aquifer.

A percolation trench is similar to a dry well, which is typically an excavated hole filled with gravel. Another similar drainage structure is a French drain, which directs water away from a building foundation, but is usually not designed to protect water quality.

== Application and design ==
Percolation trenches are often used to treat runoff from impervious surfaces, such as sidewalks and parking lots, on sites where there is limited space available for managing stormwater. They are effective at treating stormwater only if the soil has sufficient porosity. To function properly, a trench must be designed with a pretreatment structure such as a grass channel or swale, in order to capture sediment and avoid clogging the trench. It may not be appropriate for sites where there is a possibility of groundwater contamination, or where there is soil with a high clay content that could clog the trench.

== See also ==
- Best management practice for water pollution
- French drain
- Infiltration basin
- Sustainable urban drainage systems
