= Runoff footprint =

Total surface runoff that a site produces in a year

A runoff footprint is the total surface runoff that a site produces over the course of a year. According to the United States Environmental Protection Agency (EPA) stormwater is "rainwater and melted snow that runs off streets, lawns, and other sites". Urbanized areas with high concentrations of impervious surfaces like buildings, roads, and driveways produce large volumes of runoff which can lead to flooding, sewer overflows, and poor water quality. Since soil in urban areas can be compacted and have a low infiltration rate, the surface runoff estimated in a runoff footprint is not just from impervious surfaces, but also pervious areas including yards. The total runoff is a measure of the site’s contribution to stormwater issues in an area, especially in urban areas with sewer overflows. Completing a runoff footprint for a site allows a property owner to understand what areas on his or her site are producing the most runoff and what scenarios of stormwater green solutions like rain barrels and rain gardens are most effective in mitigating this runoff and its costs to the community.

== Significance ==
The runoff footprint is the stormwater equivalent to the carbon/energy footprint. When homeowners or business owners complete an energy audit or carbon footprint, they understand how they are consuming energy and learn how this consumption can be reduced through energy efficiency measures. Correspondingly, the runoff footprint allows someone to calculate their baseline annual runoff and assess what the impact of ideal stormwater green solutions would be for their site. Since the passage of the Clean Water Act in 1972, the EPA has monitored and regulated stormwater issues in urban areas. Municipalities across the United States are now required to upgrade sanitary and stormwater systems to meet EPA mandates. The total cost for these upgrades across the United States exceeds $3000 billion. The stormwater runoff from every property in an area can contribute to the overall stormwater issues including overflows and water pollution. Stormwater runoff carries nonpoint source pollution which is a leading cause of water quality issues.

By completing a runoff footprint, homeowners and business owners can consider how stormwater green solutions can reduce runoff on-site. Stormwater green solutions (also called green infrastructure) use "vegetation, soils, and natural processes to manage water and create healthier urban environments. At the scale of a city or county, green infrastructure refers to the patchwork of natural areas that provides habitat, flood protection, cleaner air, and cleaner water. At the scale of a neighborhood or site, green infrastructure refers to stormwater management systems that mimic nature by soaking up and storing water". Stormwater green solutions include bioswales (directional rain gardens), cisterns, green roofs, permeable pavement, rain barrels, and rain gardens. According to the EPA, onsite stormwater green solutions or low-impact developments (LIDs) can significantly reduce runoff and costly stormwater/sewer infrastructure upgrades.

Stormwater green solutions can also reduce energy consumption. Treating and pumping water is an energy-intensive activity. According to the River Network, the U.S. consumes at least 521 million MWh a year for water-related purposes which is the equivalent to 13% of the nation’s electricity consumption Potable water must be treated and then pumped to the consumer. Wastewater is treated before being discharged. In areas with combined sewer systems or old separate sewer systems with high inflow and infiltration, stormwater is also treated at the wastewater treatment facilities. By capturing stormwater runoff onsite in rain barrels and cisterns, the consumption of potable water for irrigation and its corresponding energy impact can be reduced. The reduction of runoff from all types of stormwater green solutions reduces the stormwater that may end up at the wastewater treatment facility in areas with combined sewer systems or old separate sewers.

== Completing a runoff footprint ==
There are number of methods available to complete a runoff footprint. The simplest methods involve using a runoff coefficient, which according to the State Water Resources Control Board of California is "a dimensionless coefficient relating the amount of runoff to the amount of precipitation received. It is a larger value for areas with low infiltration and high runoff (pavement, steep gradient), and lower for permeable, well vegetated areas (forest, flat land)." The runoff coefficients for different surface types on a site can be multiplied with the area for each surface along with the annual precipitation to generate a rough runoff footprint. If the runoff coefficient and areas of proposed stormwater green solutions like rain gardens and bioswales for the site are known, the reduction in overall runoff from these improvements can be estimated.

More accurate runoff footprint tools exist. By using computer modeling and detailed weather data, complex runoff footprints can be made easy. The amounts of pollution in the stormwater runoff can be estimated, and the effects of combinations of stormwater green solutions can be assessed. The James River Association of central Virginia provides an online tool where property owners in the James River watershed can generate a site-specific runoff pollution report. MyRunoff.org provides an online runoff footprint calculator for property owners across the United States to estimate their baseline runoff and the reduction from different scenarios of rain barrels and rain gardens. The EPA launched the National Stormwater Calculator in July, 2013, which is a desktop application for Windows allowing users to model the annual impact of a range of stormwater green solutions.
