= Henry F. French =

American jurist, inventor, Assistant US Treasury Secretary

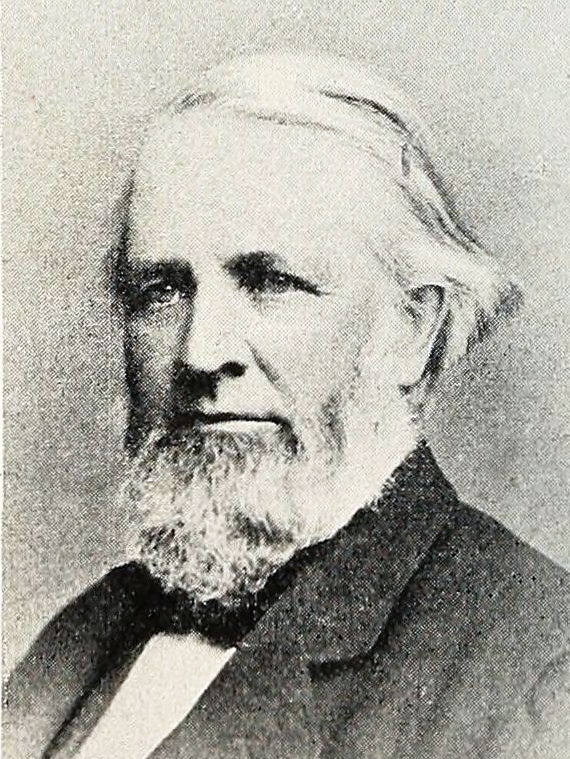
- Henry F. French c. 1866

Assistant District Attorney of Suffolk County, Massachusetts
- In office 1862–1865

President of the Massachusetts Agricultural College (now the University of Massachusetts Amherst)
- In office 1864–1866

United States Assistant Secretary of the Treasury
- In office 1876–1885

Personal details
- Born: Henry Flagg French; August 14, 1813 Chester, New Hampshire, U.S.
- Died: November 29, 1885 (aged 72) Concord, Massachusetts, U.S.
- Spouse(s): Anne Richardson (1838-1856); Pamela Mellen Prentiss (1859-1885)
- Education: Harvard Law School (Note: Contrary to some posthumous biographies, French never actually attended college, only going to law school so he to study for the state bar exams. This was brought up in a letter by his daughter, Harriet V. French, after a Mr. W.H. Bowker mistakenly said French was a Dartmouth alumnus in his dedication speech of UMass Amherst's French Hall.)

Henry Flagg French (August 14, 1813 – November 29, 1885) was an American agriculturalist, inventor, lawyer, judge, postmaster, writer, assistant secretary of the treasury, and the first president of the Massachusetts Agricultural College (now the University of Massachusetts Amherst). He was also a prominent figure in many agricultural societies, a vice president of the United States Agricultural Society, and a patent holder. He is perhaps best known for his development and popularization of the French drain, as well as being the father of renowned sculptor Daniel Chester French, who created the iconic statue of Abraham Lincoln central to the Lincoln Memorial.

== Early life ==
Henry Flagg French was born in Chester, Rockingham County, New Hampshire, on August 14, 1813, to the Honorable Daniel French (1769–1840), who was attorney general of New Hampshire and Sarah Wingate Flagg Bell French (1782–1878). He died November 29, 1885, in Middlesex County, Concord, Massachusetts. He is buried at Exeter Cemetery, in Rockingham County, New Hampshire.

== Education ==
He received his general education at Pinkerton Academy in Derry and then at Pembroke, and after that at Hingham, Massachusetts. He first studied law at the law office of his father Daniel French, and attended Harvard Law School.

== Marriages ==
On October 9, 1838, he married Anne Richardson (1811–1856), daughter of William Merchant Richardson (1774–1838), chief justice of New Hampshire. They had four children: Henriette Van Mater French Hollis (1839–1911), William Merchant Richardson French (1843–1914), Sarah Flagg French Bartlett (1846–1883), and Daniel Chester French (1850–1931).

Three years after Anne Richardson's death, on September 29, 1859, he married Pamela Mellen Prentice, (1821–1895). They had no children.

== Career ==
He was admitted to the bar on August 14, 1834 (his 21st birthday). He practiced law in Chester for five years, until his father's death in 1840. In 1839, he succeeded his father as postmaster in Chester. He then moved to Portsmouth, where he lived for one year, and then in 1842 he moved to Exeter and continued to practice law there until August 1855. He was a county solicitor from 1838 to 1848 and a bank commissioner from 1848 to 1852. He was justice of the court of common appeals from 1855 to 1859. He was district attorney for Suffolk County from 1862 to 1865. From 1852 to 1859 he was president of the Rockingham Agricultural Society. From 1865 to 1866 he was president of the Massachusetts Agricultural College. In 1852, he received honorary Master of Arts degree from Dartmouth College. On August 15, 1855, he was appointed justice of the court of common appeals. He held that office until August 1, 1859.

In September 1859, he opened a law office in Boston. In 1860, he moved his family to Cambridge, where he continued to live for some years. On November 19, 1862, he was appointed assistant district attorney and held that position until July 1865. In September 1865 he moved to Amherst. In 1867 he resumed his law practice in Boston. In 1876 he was appointed by President Grant as 2nd assistant secretary of the United States Treasury, where he served until 1885.

== Selected works ==
Although he only published one full book, French was a very prolific writer and wrote hundreds of articles for a number of agricultural journals:

- Farm Drainage; the Principles, Processes, and Effects of Draining Land, French's treatise giving full details on tile drainage and the use of the French drain.
- English Plows and Plowing, Report of the Commissioner of Patents for the Year 1859, Agriculture . p. 139-160. Advances in plowing methods and technologies such as the steam plow.
- Observations on English Husbandry.Report of the Commissioner of Patents for the Year 1860, Agriculture . p. 140-165.
- Agricultural Colleges, Report of the Secretary of Agriculture for the Year 1865. p. 137-186. A thorough history of agricultural colleges in the United States and Europe, along with their academic curricula.
The New England Farmer

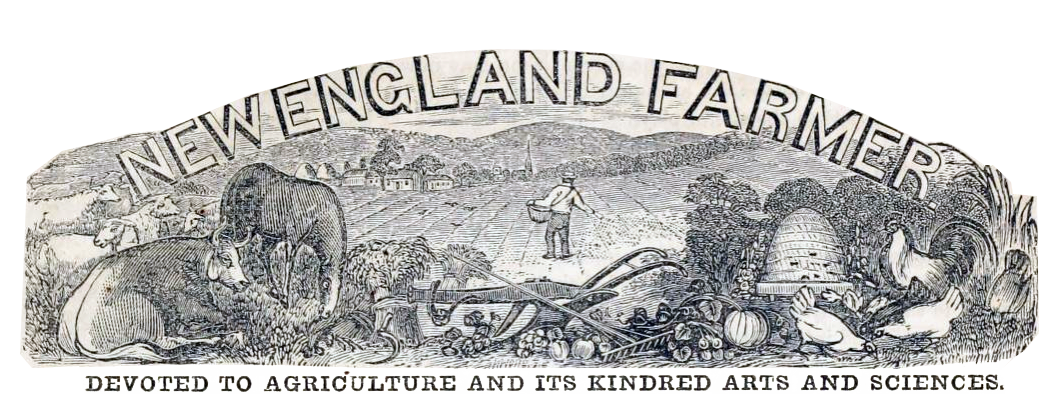

In the span of nearly 20 years Henry F. French wrote over 120 articles for the New England Farmer, a paper operated by his brother-in-law, Simon Brown, which circulated around New England and much of the Northeast United States, with letters from readers as far away as Maryland. The subjects of these articles were diverse, with many having strictly practical advice, while others being more humanitarian and philosophical in nature. Topics covered include French's travels to Europe farm maintenance, drainage, orcharding, dairy farming, women's rights, the advantages of an education, and various thoughts on establishing a more agrarian, egalitarian American society.

- The New England Farmer, Vol. 5, 1853

- "Peculiar Difficulties of New England Farming.", extract from address before the York County Agric. Soc., Maine
- "Farm Work for the Century."
- "Cutting Fodder for Stock."
- "New England Housewives.", criticism of a southern agricultural writer's views on women
- "How Can Chemistry Benefit the Farmer?"
- "Plan and Description of a Primary School in Exeter, N.H.", involvement in planning
- "Composting."
- "Laying Lands to Grass–Stones–Turnips."
- "A New Enemy in the Field." cankerworm infestion in Southeastern New Hampshire
- "Mowing Machines."
- "Turnips and Grass Seed."
- "Plowing.", brief history and role in agriculture
- "Pigs and Turnips."

- The New England Farmer, Vol. 6, 1854

- "Farm Accounts–Reclaiming Swamps
- "City Railroads–A Model Staple."
- "Make Your Girls Independent.", article advocating education for women
- "Sewing Machine.", an article targeted at women, discusses the advantages of technology
- "Guano–Private Correspondence.", response to a letter
- "What Kind of Farming?", response to a letter
- "Hay-cutters–How to Save Children's Fingers."

- The New England Farmer, Vol. 7, 1855

- "Talk About Guano."
- "Other Peoples' Business."
- "Letter from Mr. French.", "A Glance at Washington City Market."
- "Letter from Mr. French.", "A Yankee Farm near Washington."
- "Guano and Superphosphate Once More."
- "Thoughts on Climate.", discusses New England's colder climate and its inhabitants' tolerance of it
- "Thoughts Upon Soil Analysis and Specific Manures."
- "Double Plow."
- "Letter from Mr. French.", "Washington City in Spring-time."
- "Of the Practical Value of Analysis of Soil."
- "Letter from the Homestead."
- "Letter from the Homestead.", "What kind of Farm to choose", use of stones in walls and drainage
- "A Glance at a New Hampshire Fruit Garden."

- The New England Farmer, Vol. 8, 1856

- "How to Keep Your House Warm in the Country.", discusses use of Franklin stoves rather than open fireplaces, principles of ventilation
- "How to Keep Your House Warm in the Country.", continues previous article, mentions use of back plastering, double windows, compares furnaces and stoves
- "Circumstances Alter Cases.", the resistance of some in the farming community to new agricultural methods, the use of mathematics in agriculture
- "Circumstances Alter Cases.", how to apply manure, compost and other fertilizers, seeding plowing, "Distinction between Rules and Principles"
- "Letter from Mr. French.", "Drawing Water–Hybrid Plants–Breeding Livestock."
- "Cheap Luxuries–Lawns."
- "Fancy Farming.", "Hay Caps–Mowing Machines–Root Crops–Wheel Hoes–The Double Plow–Boxes and Bugs."
- "Bog Meadows.", response to a letter
- "Too Many Shade Trees."
- "Draining With Tiles.", discusses French's experiences with drainage, early development of the French drain which would be explained in further detail a few years later with the release of his widely-used book on the subject
- "Thorough Draining."

- The New England Farmer, Vol. 9, 1857, during this year French was on tour in Europe doing research on tile drainage. It was from this experience that he developed the French drain

- "Letter from Mr. French.", meeting of the United States Agricultural Society in Washington D.C., commendation given to French for his trip abroad.
- "Letter from Mr. French.", description of Washington D.C. prior to the inauguration for President-elect Buchanan, its climate, produce, hotels, and infrastructure
- "Letter from Mr. French.", French writes of the inauguration ceremonies, the weather, and the disinterest in agriculture in Washington.
- "Letter from Mr. French.", description of French's farm on the homestead, his agricultural techniques, and his hopes for learning more about European soil draining. Written from Exeter, NH.
- "Plowing the Deep.", journey aboard the Steamship Khersonese, thorough details of its modern construction and day to day operations.
- "First Week in England.", written from London.
- "Letter from Mr. French.", attentive details on a flower shop and the landscapes of the English countryside.
- "Letter from Mr. French."
- "Mr. French in England.", speech by French at the Suffolk Agricultural Association, originally published in the "Mark Lane Express" of London.
- "Letter from Mr. French.", arrives in Paris, writes of the French culture, farming and weather.
- "An English Cattle Show.", hosted by the Suffolk Agricultural Association; cattle and farming implements.
- "Letter from Mr. French.", exhibition of the Royal Agricultural Society; tile machines and steam plows
- "Letter from Mr. French.", exhibition of the Royal Agricultural Society; livestock breeds
- "Letter from England.", mentions draining tile technology
- "Letter from Mr. French."
- "Letter from Mr. French.", arrival in Germany, travelling on the Rhine
- "Letter from Mr. French."
- "The Rhine."

- The New England Farmer, Vol 10, 1858

- "Switzerland.", "Letter from Mr. French."
- "Switzerland.", "Letter from Mr. French."
- "Switzerland.", "Letter from Mr. French."
- "Letter from Mr. French.", Lyon, France.
- "Letter from Mr. French.", Lyon, France.
- "Culture of the Mangold Wurtzel."
- "Flax--Potatoes and Peas."
- "Steam Plows--[Continued.]"
- "Tales of a Traveller"
- "Letter from Mr. French.", "The Alps and Glaciers."
- "Letter from an English Farmer."
- "Letter from Mr. French.", Waterford, Ireland, 1857.
- "Letter from Mr. French.", return to America, written on Steamship Europa. Appears to have been written a year prior to publishing.
- "Glasnevin Model Farm, Ireland"
- "Letter from a Traveller, from a "B.B. French", lists conversation with Henry French. Relation unknown.
- "Wire Fences.", response to a letter.
- "Wire Fences Once More."
- "About Mr. Mechi's Farming."
- "Letter from Judge French.", written from Exeter, NH.
- "Letter from Judge French.", "A Look at the Cattle Show, and at Agriculture in Cheshire County, New Hampshire."
- "Advantages of Education to Farmers.", discusses soil fertility, composition and analysis.
- "Willis's Patent Stump Puller."

- The New England Farmer, Vol 11, 1859

- "Letter from Judge French.", agriculture in Coos County, NH.
- "River Cottage"
- "Legislation–Land Drainage Companies."
- "Legislation–Land Drainage Companies.", continued.
- "Legislation–Land Drainage Companies.", continued.
- "High Farming–Prof. Mapes's Farm–Superphosphate."
- "Drainage–Power of Soils to Retain Manure.", similar principles discussed to those in French's treatise on drainage.
- "A New Work on Draining.", release of French's book
- "Farm Drainage.", excerpt from French's book on the same subject.
- "Massachusetts Society for Promoting Agriculture."
- "The Little Subsoiler."
- "The Progression of Primaries.", "Analysis of Soil and Fertilizers."
- "Influence of Drainage on Health.", omitted chapter from French's "Treatise on Farm Drainage".
- "Surface Manuring."

- The New England Farmer, Vol. 12, 1860

- "A Little More About Drainage."
- "The Wild Lands of Long Island."
- "Liquid Manures."
- "Schools of Agriculture."
- "What Makes the Water Bad?"
- "What We Find in an English Newspaper."

- The New England Farmer, Vol. 13, 1861

- "The Long Island Lands; What John Johnston Thinks of Them."
- "City and Country."
- "Drainage.", response to a letter
- "Principles of Breeding."
- "Does Drainage Injure Land by Leaching?"
- "A Pleasant Home."
- "Letter from the Homestead.", repairing old buildings, shingling and timber
- "Corn and Cotton–Which is King?"
- "Letter from the Homestead.", fruit production, grey squirrels

- The New England Farmer, Vol. 14, 1862

- "Small and Large Farms."
- "Jefferson at Monticello."
- "How is the World to be Fed?"
- "Insects Injurious to Vegetation."
- "Observations on Drainage."
- "The Patent Office Report."

- The New England Farmer, Vol. 15, 1863, The January issue is the last with French listed as an "Associate Editor" as his duties as "Assistant District Attorney" of Suffolk County proved too time consuming.

- "The War and the Farmer"
- "Judge French.", explanation for French's resignation as an editor
- "Letter from Mr. French.", the welfare of the soldiers
- "A Rat in a Tile Drain.", explains methods and advantages of using tile to prevent pests from clogging drains
- "Report of the Commissioner of Agriculture."
- Announcement of Suspension, due to rising costs in material and labor due to the war, the periodical's publication was suspended from August until January of the following year.

- The New England Farmer, Vol. 16, 1864.

- "Report of the Commissioner of Agriculture."
- "War and Agriculture.", "Retrospect of the Year 1863."

- The New England Farmer, Vol. 1, 1867, the magazine was relaunched following a period of absence from 1865 to 1866.

- "Product of Cows.", reprint from The Country Gentleman

- The New England Farmer, Vol. 3, 1869.

- "A Little Drainage Operation"

- The New England Farmer, Vol. 4, 1870.

- "French's Patent Cultivator.", includes illustration and testimony
- "Massachusetts State Board of Health.", "Look out for Poison–Poison in the Air–Poison in the Water."

The Country Gentleman

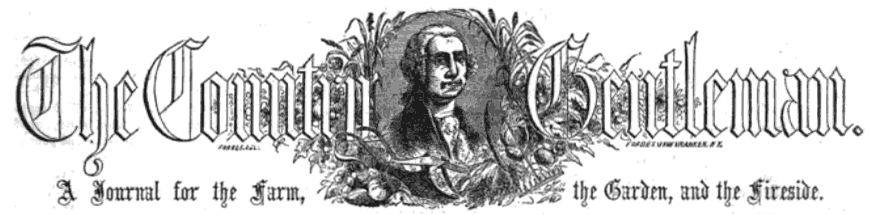

- The Country Gentleman, Vol. 1, 1853

- "Position of Woman.", address given before the York County Agricultural Society at Saco, Maine, describing the conditions with which woman were treated in New England and many parts of the country at the time.
- "How I Bought a Horse that had the Heaves."

- The Country Gentleman, Vol 2, 1853

- "New Hampshire Agriculture." from Transactions of the New Hampshire Agricultural Society
- "Fruit Growing in New Hampshire" from Transactions of the New Hampshire Agricultural Society

- The Country Gentleman, Vol. 3, 1854

- "Winter Killing of Fruit Trees and Fruit Buds."
- "Stick to the Farm."

- The Country Gentleman, Vol. 4, 1854

- "Make Your Girls Independent."

- The Country Gentleman, Vol. 5, 1855

- "Advantages of Education to Farmers.–I", page 28. Listed in index, page missing.
- "Advantages of Education to Farmers.–II."
- "Advantages of Education to Farmers.–III."
- "Advantages of Education to Farmers.–III."
- "Advantages of Education to Farmers.–III." (IV?)
- "Advantages of Education to Farmers.–V."
- "Advantages of Education to Farmers.–VI."
- "Northern Farmers in Virginia."
- "Fruit Culture near Washington."

- The Country Gentleman, Vol. 6, 1855

- "Planting Tree.", reprint from New England Farmer of "Letters from the Homestead." (I) in Vol. 7.

- The Country Gentleman, Vol. 8, 1856.

- "Reclaiming Bogs and Swamps." reprint from New England Farmer of "Bog Meadows." in Vol. 8.
- "Experiment with Underdraining." reprint from New England Farmer of "Draining with Tiles." in Vol. 8.

- The Country Gentleman, Vol. 20, 1862

- "Letter from Hon. Henry F. French.", to Luther H. Tucker, Esq., publisher of the magazine.

- The Country Gentleman, Vol. 21, 1863

- "Wayside Notes.", drainage, sheep, agricultural colleges.

- The Country Gentleman, Vol. 23, 1864.

- "War and Agriculture.", partial reprint of same title from New England Farmer, Vol. 16.
- "War and Agriculture.", continued.
- "Letter from Judge French.", English farming
- "An Agricultural College.", an account of agricultural colleges around the country and French's own views on the function of such institutions. At this time he was unaware that he would be chosen as the first president of the Massachusetts Agricultural College. Extracted paragraphs from his piece, "English Husbandry" and (later published) department of agriculture report, "Agricultural Colleges".
- "An Agricultural College.", continued.
- "An Agricultural College.", continued.

- The Country Gentleman, Vol. 24, 1864.

- "Letter from the Homestead."
- "Notes on Recent Numbers.", apple orchards, winter killing of fruit buds
- "Massachusetts Agricultural College.", executive committee of the college trustees (French, Colt & Davis) announce the choice of Amherst for the location of the new campus.
- "Morality of Tobacco Raising." French expresses his anti-tobacco sentiment. Also notes some controversy that arose in choosing Amherst as the town for the new college, with some members of the board having concern for tobacco crops being grown on campus, and others with shares in the tobacco industry having a conflict of interest.
- "Management of Orchards."
- "Massachusetts Agricultural College.", announcing French's appointment as president of the college.
- "A Glance at Irish Agriculture."
- "A Glance at Irish Agriculture.", continued.

- The Country Gentleman, Vol. 25, 1865.

- "Drainage in England."
- "Drainage in England.", continued.
- "Letter from Judge French.", concerning visit to Albany, accounts of New York agriculture.

- The Country Gentleman, Vol. 26, 1865.

- "The Game Laws of England."
- "The Game Laws of England." continued.

- The Cultivator & Country Gentleman, Vol. 28, 1866.

- "Agricultural Statistics.", rebuttal, citing error in criticism of French's tobacco article

- The Cultivator & Country Gentleman, Vol. 29, 1867.

- "Massachusetts Agricultural College", French's resignation

- The Cultivator & Country Gentleman, Vol. 30, 1867.

- "Letter from Judge French."

- The Cultivator & Country Gentleman, Vol. 33, 1869.

- "Soiling Cows for Milk.", grazing practices, fertilizing fields
- "Farmers' Convention in New-Hampshire."
- "Talk About Cows."
- "A Herd of Jerseys."
- "Letter from Mr. French.", discusses improvements to stables, agriculture as seen in his travels in Maine, Pennsylvania and elsewhere.

- The Cultivator & Country Gentleman, Vol. 34, 1869.

- "Propagation of Shad in Massachusetts", early raising of fish in Massachusetts.
- "How to Manure Our Farms."
- "Drainage About Our Houses."

- The Cultivator & Country Gentleman, Vol. 40, 1875.

- "Capital in Agriculture."
