= Percolation test =

Measure of the absorption rate of soil

A percolation test (colloquially called a perc test) is a test to determine the water absorption rate of soil (that is, its capacity for percolation) in preparation for the building of a septic drain field (leach field) or infiltration basin. The results of a percolation test are required to design a septic system properly. In its broadest terms, percolation testing observes how quickly a known volume of water dissipates into the subsoil of a drilled hole of known surface area. While every jurisdiction will have laws regarding the exact calculations for the length of line, depth of pit, etc., the testing procedures are the same.

In general, sandy soil will absorb more water than soil with a high concentration of clay or where the water table is close to the surface.

== Testing method ==
A percolation test consists of digging one or more holes in the soil to be tested, filling the holes with water up to a specific level, and then timing the drop of the water level as the water percolates into the surrounding soil. The holes are presoaked by maintaining a high water level for a period of time (usually several hours) before the test begins.

There are various empirical formulae for determining the required size of a leach field based on the size of the facility, the percolation test results, and other parameters.

For leach line testing, at least three test holes are drilled or dug by hand, most commonly six to eight inches in diameter and three to six feet below the surface. For more conclusive results, five drill holes are used in a pattern of one hole at each corner of the proposed leach field and one test hole in the center. Testing these holes will result in a value with units of minutes per inch. This value is then correlated to a predetermined county health code to establish the exact size of the leach field.

Testing for horizontal pits typically requires five to eight test holes drilled in a straight line or along a common contour from three to ten feet below the surface. This testing is identical to leach line testing, though the result is a different type of septic system established through a different calculation.

$$\text{percolation rate} = {\text{amount of water (ml)} \over \text{time taken (min)}} = {x}\;\text{ml/min}$$

Vertical seepage pits differ slightly in testing methods due to their large size, but the primary testing method is essentially the same. A hole, typically three to four feet in diameter, is drilled to a depth of twenty or thirty feet, depending on the local groundwater table. A fire hose is used to fill the pit as quickly as possible, and then, again, its dissipation rate is observed. This rate calculates the size and number of pits necessary for a viable septic system.

Finally, a "deep hole" is drilled to find the water table or to approximately twelve feet (dry) for leach line systems and horizontal seepage pits. Exact depths depend on local health codes. In the case of a vertical seepage pit, local groundwater data may be used, or if the drill hole reaches groundwater, the pit will be backfilled according to the county health code.

== Alternatives ==
Some jurisdictions question the accuracy of a percolation test to assess soil treatment quality and instead utilize soil texture analysis—along with long-term acceptance rates (LTAR)—in place of or in addition to a percolation test.
