= Infiltration basin =

Form of engineered sump or percolation pond

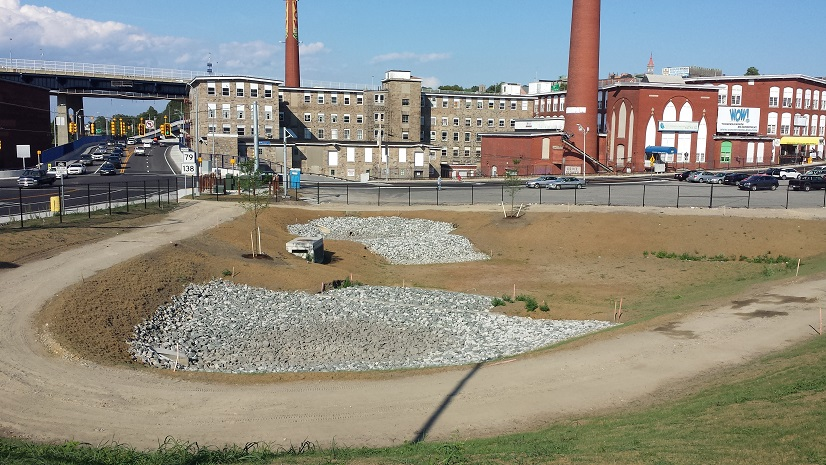
Recently completed infiltration basin for stormwater collection

An infiltration basin (or recharge basin) is a form of engineered sump or percolation pond that is used to manage stormwater runoff, prevent flooding and downstream erosion, and improve water quality in an adjacent river, stream, lake or bay. It is essentially a shallow artificial pond that is designed to infiltrate stormwater through permeable soils into the groundwater aquifer. Infiltration basins do not release water except by infiltration, evaporation or emergency overflow during flood conditions.

It is distinguished from a detention basin, sometimes called a dry pond, which is designed to discharge to a downstream water body (although it may incidentally infiltrate some of its volume to groundwater); and from a retention basin, which is designed to include a permanent pool of water.

== Design considerations ==
Infiltration basins must be carefully designed to infiltrate the soil on a given site at a rate that will not cause flooding. They may be less effective in areas with:

- High groundwater levels, close to the infiltrating surface
- Compacted soils
- High levels of sediment in stormwater
- High clay soil content.

At some sites infiltration basins have worked effectively where the installation also includes an extended detention basin as a pretreatment stage, to remove sediment. The basins may fail where they cannot be frequently maintained, and their use is discouraged in some areas of the United States. For example, they are not recommended for use in the U.S. state of Georgia, which has many areas with high clay soil content, unless soil on the particular site is modified ("engineered soil") during construction, to improve the infiltration characteristics.

== See also ==
- Dry well
- French drain
- Percolation trench
- Rain garden
- Sustainable urban drainage systems
- Septic drain field
- Tree box filter
- Semicircular bund
