= Onsite sewage facility =

Wastewater systems to treat effluent on the same property that produces the wastewater

Onsite sewage facilities (OSSF), also called septic systems, are wastewater systems designed to treat and dispose of effluent on the same property that produces the wastewater, in areas not served by public sewage infrastructure.

A septic tank and drainfield combination is a fairly common type of on-site sewage facility in the Western world. OSSFs account for approximately 25% of all domestic wastewater treatment in the US. Onsite sewage facilities may also be based on small-scale aerobic and biofilter units, membrane bioreactors or sequencing batch reactors. These can be thought of as scaled down versions of municipal sewage treatment plants, and are also known as "package plants."

== Process description ==
The primary mechanism of biological waste recycling in the natural environment is performed by other organisms such as animals, insects, soil microorganisms, plants, and fungi, which consume all available nutrients in the waste, leaving behind fully decomposed solids that become part of topsoil, and pure drinking water that has been stripped of everything that can possibly be consumed and utilized. This natural biological purification requires time and space to process wastes.

In virtually all engineered onsite sewage facilities, recycling and decomposition by natural organisms is still the primary mechanism of sewage disposal. Giving the organisms the time they need to decompose wastes is accomplished by establishing minimum sewage retention and settling times, and minimum liquid flow distances between sewage disposal sites and surface water or water wells.

=== Differences ===
It is normal for animals such as mice, rats, flies, and parasites to participate in the fully natural biological waste recycling process. Engineered facilities typically attempt to exclude them to prevent out of control population explosions and infestation, and prevent spread of vermin and disease.

Although the solids collected by onsite sewage facilities can potentially be used as compost to build topsoil, these solids are often incompletely decomposed due to either a lack of onsite storage space to wait for decomposition (municipal facilities), or because the solids are being stacked in a layered structure of new waste solids on top of previously decomposed solids (septic tanks and outhouses). Due to the incomplete state of decomposition, when removed from an onsite sewage facility, these solids are typically referred to as sludge rather than compost, and have powerful offensive odors arising from the microorganisms still consuming nutrients in the sludge.

Engineered facilities that use water suspension to transport solids (private septic systems and municipal facilities) typically form a floating layer in their primary settling tank, consisting of low-density liquids such as oils, buoyant solids, and soap foam. This is referred to as scum and is slowly decomposed by microorganisms, eventually falling to the bottom of the settling tank as part of the sludge. When private septic tanks are emptied of solids, the tank is typically vacuumed empty and the incompletely digested scum is added to the incompletely digested sludge, further adding to its aroma and bioactivity.

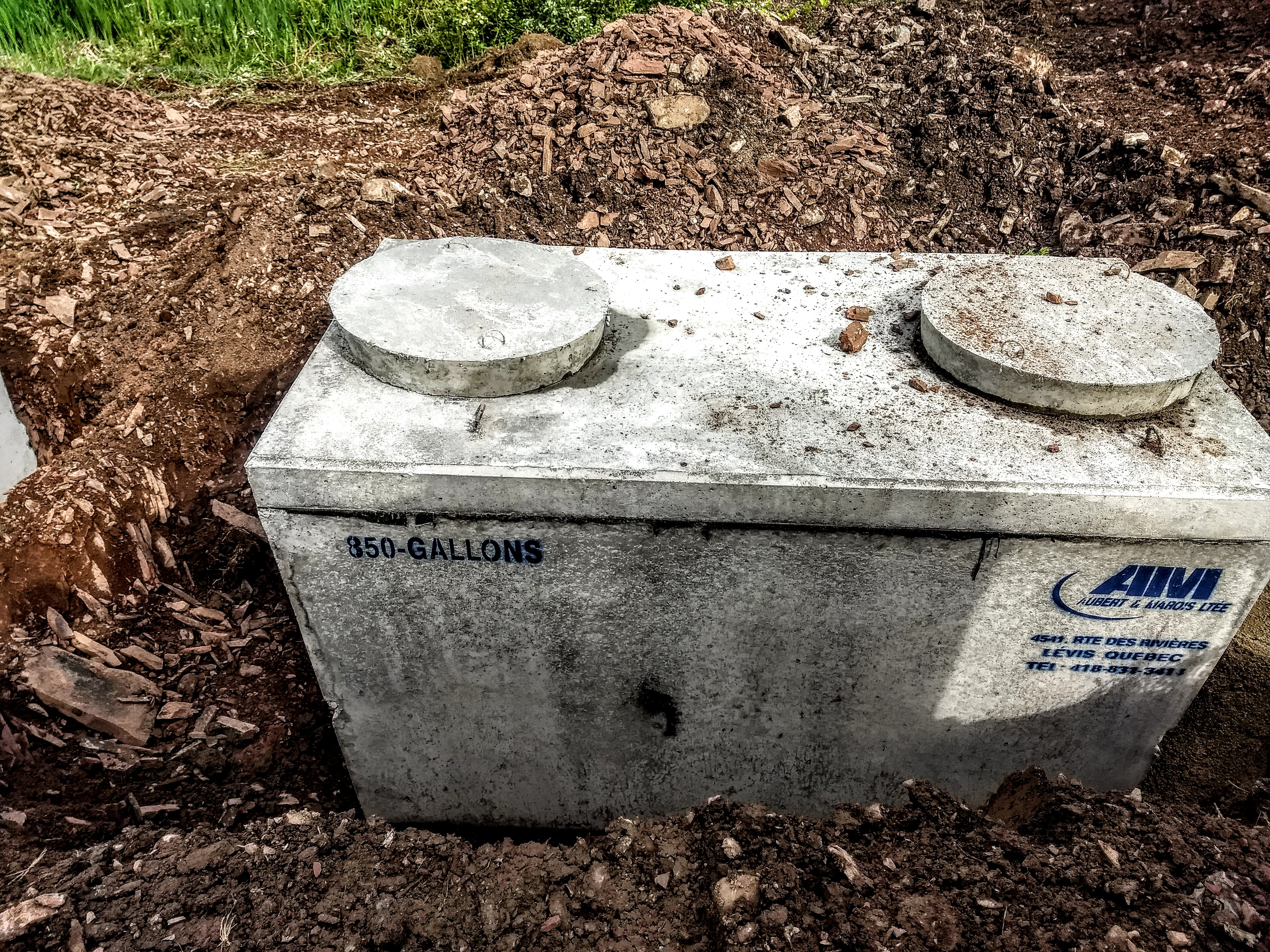
A septic tank being installed. The next step is to plug it to the intake and outtake pipes and backfill it with soil.

If left completely undisturbed and exposed to the open air through a vent, the sludge and scum in a settling tank will eventually be turned completely into low-odor compost. Placing two tanks side by side allows one to rest while the other is in use, so the resting tank can later be safely cleaned by hand. This has been proposed as a solution for onsite sewage facilities in subsistence agriculture economies where hand labor is the most abundant.

Although human body waste is no different from that of other animals, municipal facilities may be required to bury collected solids in landfills due to the risk of toxic contaminants introduced into the shared sewage system by people unaware of the consequences. These systems may also collect roadway runoff, which contains traces of vehicle fluids like brake fluid and engine oil, as well as chemicals used for melting ice and snow. Private septic systems typically avoid such contamination, as homeowners are directly aware not to dispose of toxic substances down the drain.

== Improving treatment through performance requirements ==
Most onsite wastewater treatment systems are of the conventional type, consisting of a septic tank and a subsurface wastewater infiltration system (SWIS). Site limitations and more stringent performance requirements have led to significant improvements in the design of wastewater treatment systems and how they are managed. Over the past 20 years the onsite wastewater treatment system (OWTS) industry has developed many new treatment technologies that can achieve high performance levels on sites with size, soil, ground water, and landscape limitations that might preclude installing conventional systems. New technologies and improvements to existing technologies are based on defining the performance requirements of the system, characterizing wastewater flow and pollutant loads, evaluating site conditions, defining performance and design boundaries, and selecting a system design that addresses these factors.

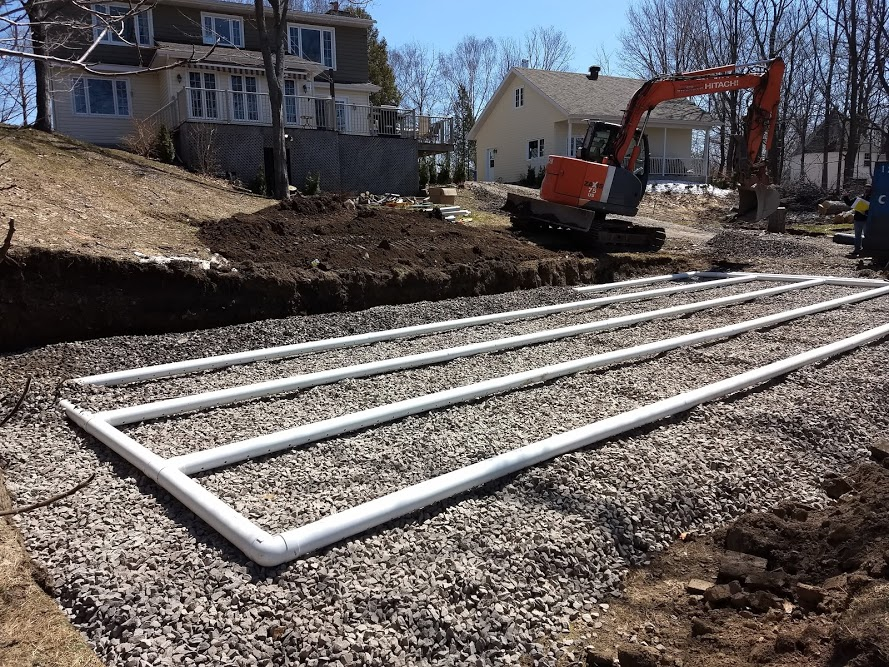
After solid matters are retained in the tank, liquid wastes are moved through these pierced PVC pipes to be evenly evacuated onto the gravel layer.

Performance requirements can be expressed as numeric criteria (e.g., pollutant concentration or mass loading limits) or narrative criteria (e.g., no odors or visible sheen) and are based on the assimilative capacity of regional ground water or surface waters, water quality objectives, and public health goals. Wastewater flow and pollutant content help define system design and size and can be estimated by comparing the size and type of facility with measured effluent outputs from similar, existing facilities. Site evaluations integrate detailed analyses of regional hydrology, geology, and water resources with site specific characterization of soils, slopes, structures, property lines, and other site features to further define system design requirements and determine the physical placement of system components.

Most of the alternative treatment technologies applied today treat wastes after they exit the septic tank; the tank retains settleable solids, grease, and oils and provides an environment for partial digestion of settled organic wastes. Post-tank treatment can include aerobic (with oxygen) or anaerobic (with no or low oxygen) biological treatment in suspended or fixed-film reactors, physical/chemical treatment, soil infiltration, fixed-media filtration, and/or disinfection. The application and sizing of treatment units based on these technologies are defined by performance requirements, wastewater characteristics, and site conditions.

== Usage and norms by country ==
=== Canada ===
Under Canadian federalism, the environment is a shared power between federal and provincial governments. However, waste water management mostly falls within provincial, territorial and municipal jurisdiction, while the federal government has jurisdiction over wastewater on federal land and on First Nations reserves. Each province and territory has its own norms and regulations concerning the design and installation of onsite sewage facilities, such as whether a permit is required to do so and how to obtain it, the type, size and location of the system (usually according to on-site soil characteristics and other factors), etc. :

Province or territory	Department or Ministry	Act — Regulation
Prince Edward Island	Department of Technology and Environment	Environmental Protection — Act Sewage Disposal Regulation
Newfoundland and Labrador	Department of Health	Public Health Act — Sanitation Regulation
Nova Scotia	Department of the Environment	Environment Act — On-site Sewage Disposal Regulation
New Brunswick	Department of Health and Community Services	Health Act — Regulation 88-200
Quebec	Department of Environment	Environmental Quality Act — Q-2, r. 22 - Regulation Respecting Wastewater Disposal Systems for Isolated Dwellings
Ontario	Ministry of Municipal Affairs and Housing	Ontario Building Code Part 8
Manitoba	Department of the Environment	Environment Act — Private Sewage Disposal Systems and Privies Regulation
Saskatchewan	Department of Health	Public Health Act — Plumbing and Drainage Regulation
Alberta	Ministry of Labour	Safety Codes Act — Alberta Private Sewage Systems Standards of Practice
British Columbia	Ministry of Health Services	Health Act — Sewerage System Regulation
North West Territories	Department of Health and Social Services	Public Health Act — General Sanitation Regulations
Yukon Territory	Department of Health	Public Health and Safety Act — Sewage Disposal System Regulations

=== Europe ===
The potential market volume of on-site treatment is suggested to be about 35 million population equivalents for Europe.

=== United States ===
In the United States, on site sewage facilities collect, treat, and release about 4 billion US gallons (15,000,000 m^{3}) of treated effluent per day from an estimated 26 million homes, businesses, and recreational facilities nationwide (U.S. Census Bureau, 1997). Recognition of the impacts of onsite systems on ground water and surface water quality (e.g., nitrate and bacteria contamination, nutrient inputs to surface waters) has increased interest in optimizing the systems' performance. Public health and environmental protection officials now acknowledge that onsite systems are not just temporary installations that will be replaced eventually by centralized sewage treatment services, but permanent approaches to treating wastewater for release and reuse in the environment. Onsite systems are recognized as viable, low-cost, long-term, decentralized approaches to wastewater treatment if they are planned, designed, installed, operated, and maintained properly (USEPA, 1997). NOTE: In addition to existing state and local oversight, decentralized wastewater treatment systems that serve more than 20 people might become subject to regulation under the USEPA's Underground Injection Control Program, although EPA has proposed not to include them (64FR22971:5/7/01).

Although some onsite wastewater management programs have functioned successfully in the past, problems persist. Most current onsite regulatory programs focus on permitting and installation.

Few programs address onsite system operation and maintenance, resulting in failures that lead to unnecessary costs and risks to public health and water resources. Moreover, the lack of coordination among agencies that oversee land use planning, zoning, development, water resource protection, public health initiatives, and onsite systems causes problems that could be prevented through a more cooperative approach. Effective management of onsite systems requires rigorous planning, design, installation, operation, maintenance, monitoring, and controls.

==== Public health and water resource impacts ====
State and tribal agencies report that onsite septic systems currently constitute the third most common source of groundwater pollution and that these systems have failed because of inappropriate siting or design or inadequate long-term maintenance (USEPA, 1996a). In the 1996 Clean Water Needs Survey (USEPA, 1996b), states and tribes also identified more than 500 communities as having failed septic systems that have caused public health problems. The discharge of partially treated sewage from malfunctioning onsite systems was identified as a principal or contributing source of degradation in 32 percent of all harvest-limited shellfish growing areas. Onsite wastewater treatment systems have also contributed to an overabundance of nutrients in ponds, lakes, and coastal estuaries, leading to the excessive growth of algae and other nuisance aquatic plants (USEPA, 1996b). In addition, onsite systems contribute to contamination of drinking water sources. USEPA estimates that 168,000 viral illnesses and 34,000 bacterial illnesses occur each year as a result of consumption of drinking water from systems that rely on improperly treated ground water. Malfunctioning septic systems have been identified as one potential source of ground water contamination (USEPA, 2000).

In 2022, trials were underway on Cape Cod, Massachusetts of septic systems that reduce nitrogen pollution using wood chips and limestone.

== See also ==
- Decentralized wastewater system
- Fecal sludge management
- Sanitation
- Sewage farm
