= French drain =

Sub-surface drainage system

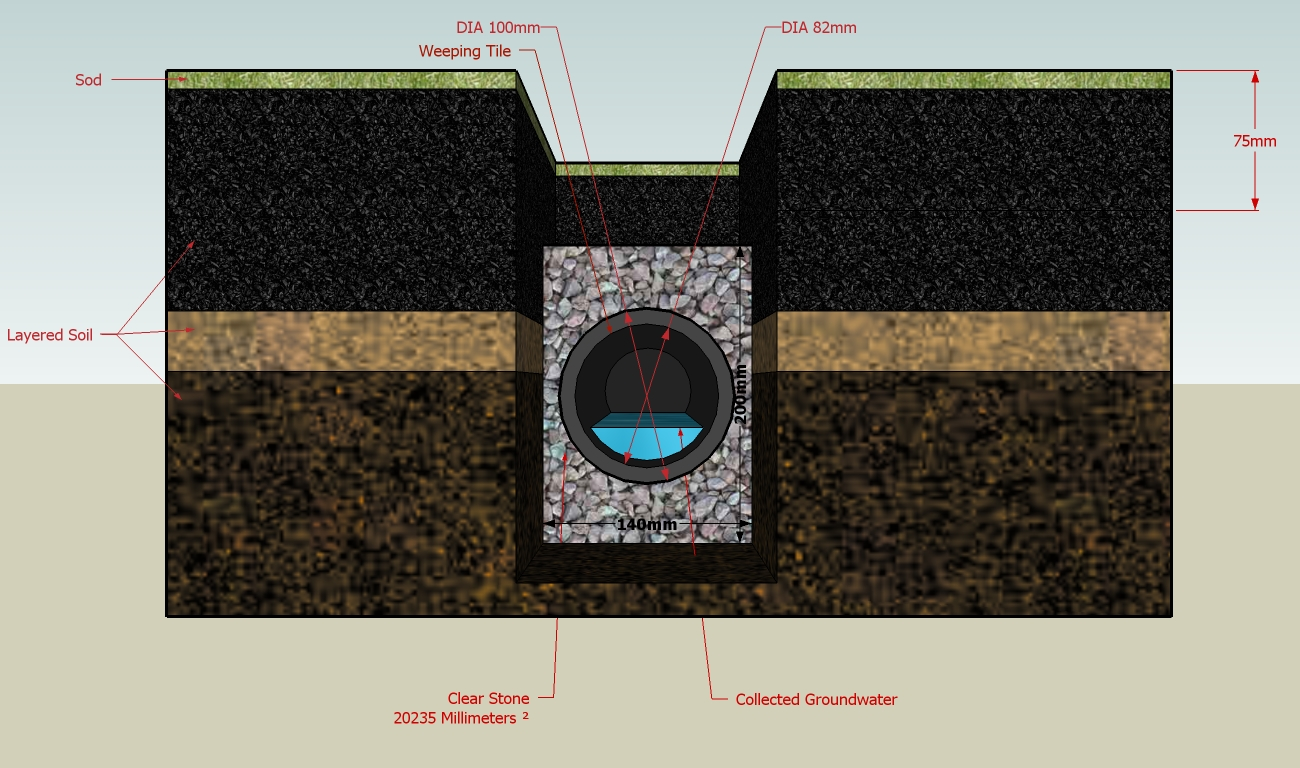
A diagram of a traditional French drain

A French drain (also known by other names including trench drain, blind drain, rubble drain, and rock drain) is a trench filled with gravel or rock, or both, with or without a perforated pipe that redirects surface water and groundwater away from an area. The perforated pipe is called a weeping tile (also called a drain tile or perimeter tile). When the pipe is draining, it "weeps", or exudes liquids. It was named when drainpipes were made from terracotta tiles.

French drains are primarily used to prevent ground and surface water from penetrating or damaging building foundations and as an alternative to open ditches or storm sewers for streets and highways. Alternatively, French drains may be used to distribute water, such as a septic drain field at the outlet of a typical septic tank sewage treatment system. French drains are also used behind retaining walls to relieve ground water pressure.

== History ==
The earliest forms of French drains were simple ditches that were pitched from a high area to a lower one and filled with gravel. Henry Flagg French (1813–1885) of Concord, Massachusetts, a lawyer and Assistant U.S. Treasury Secretary, described and popularized them in Farm Drainage (1859). French's drains were made of sections of ordinary roofing tile that were laid with a 1/8 in (0.32 cm) gap in between the sections to admit water. Later, specialized drain tiles were designed with perforations. To prevent clogging, the size of the gravel varied from coarse in the center to fine on the outside and was selected contingent on the gradation of the surrounding soil. The sizes of particles were critical to prevent the surrounding soil from washing into the pores, i. e., voids between the particles of gravel and thereby clogging the drain. The later development of geotextiles greatly simplified this technique. Subsurface drainage systems have been used for centuries. They have many forms that are similar in design and function to the traditional French drain.

== Structure ==
Ditches are dug manually or by a trencher. An inclination of 1 in 100 to 1 in 200 is typical. Lining the bottom of the ditch with clay or plastic pipe increases the volume of water that can flow through the drain. Modern French drain systems are made of perforated pipe, for example weeping tile surrounded by sand or gravel, and geotextile or landscaping textile. Landscaping textiles prevent migration of the drainage material and prevent soil and roots from entering and clogging the pipe. The perforated pipe provides a minor subterranean volume of storage for water, yet the prime purpose is drainage of the area along the full length of the pipe via its perforations and to discharge any surplus water at its terminus. The direction of percolation depends on the relative conditions within and without the pipe.

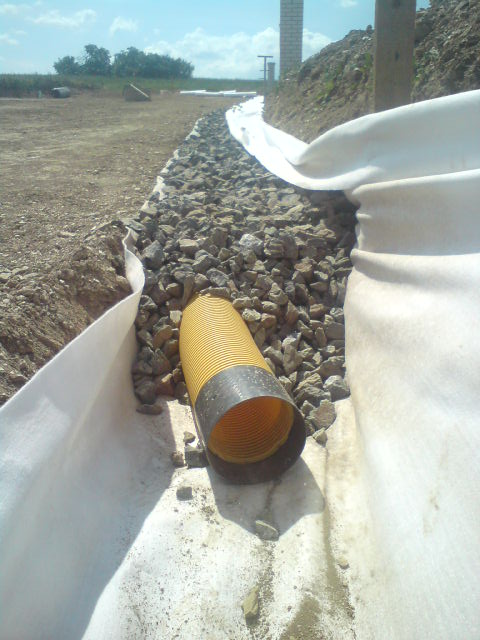
Highway French drain under construction

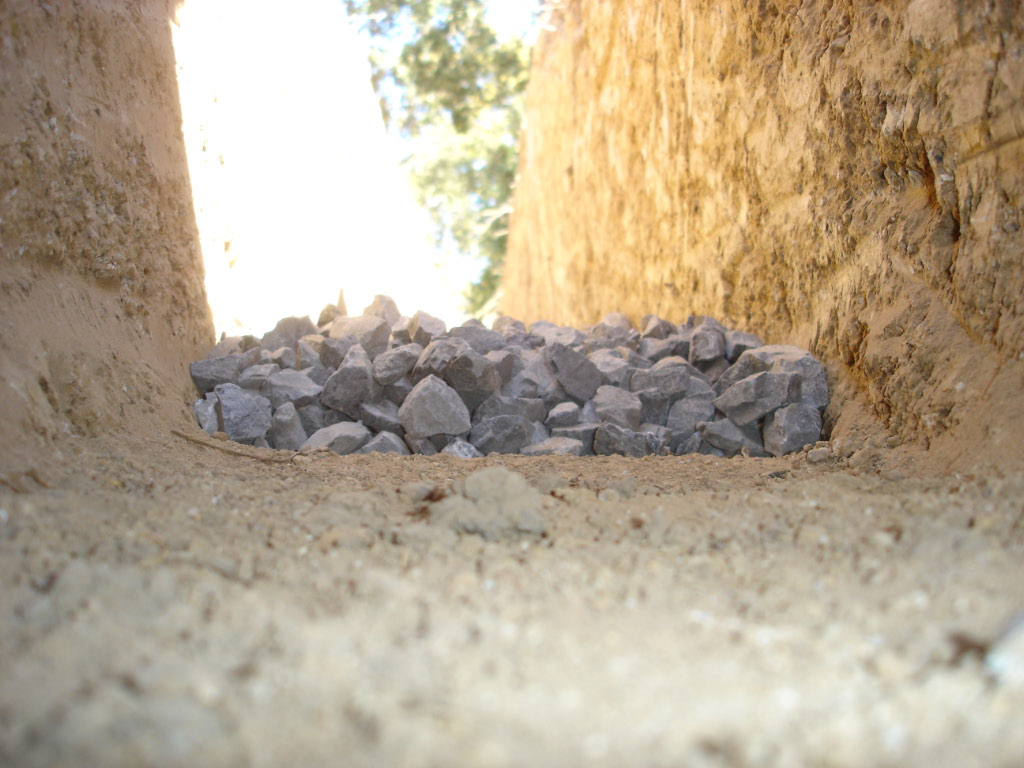
Coarse washed stone base in place

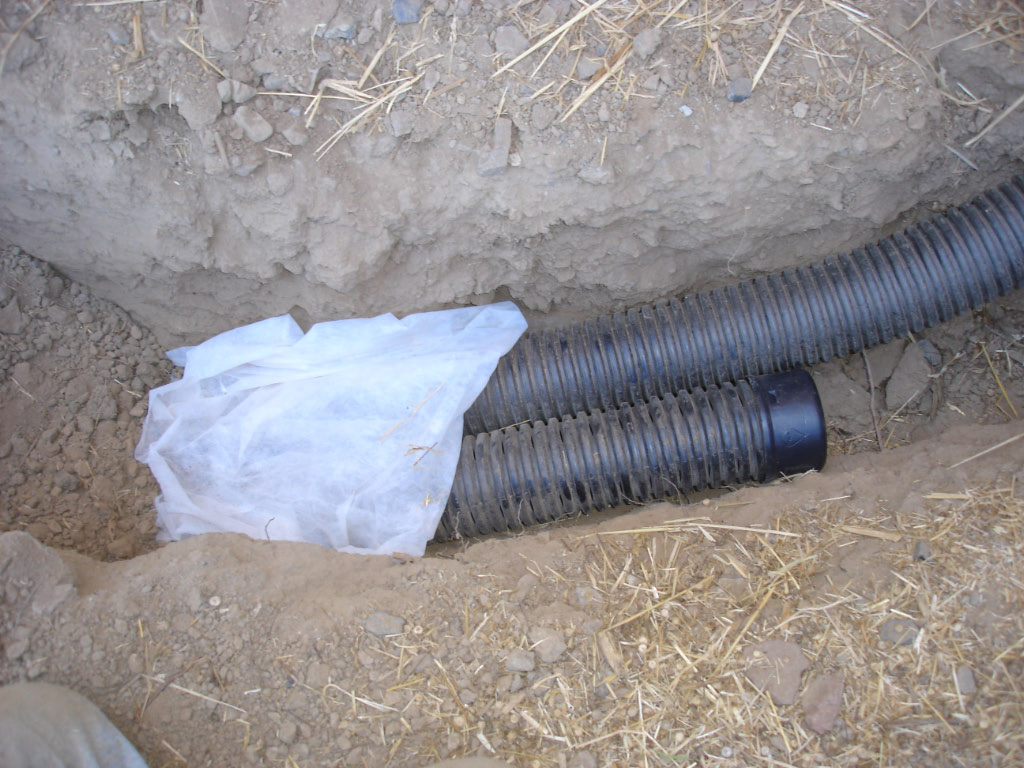
Filter fabric over pipe

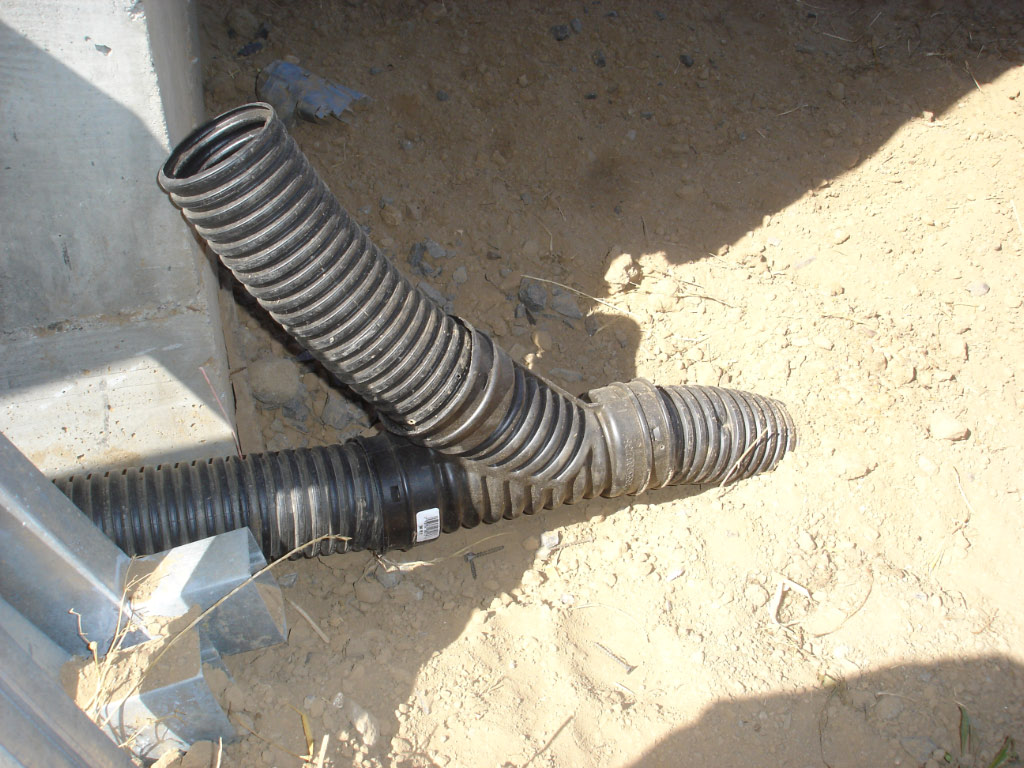
A wye joining a perforated and a solid corrugated pipe to a buried solid outlet

== Variants ==
Variations of French drains include:

Curtain drain
This form comprises a perforated pipe surrounded by gravel. It is similar to the traditional French drain, the gravel or aggregate material of which extends to the surface of the ground and is uncovered to permit collection of water, except that a curtain drain does not extend to the surface and instead is covered by soil, in which turf grass or other vegetation may be planted, so that the drain is concealed.
Filter drain
This form drains groundwater.
Collector drain
This form combines drainage of groundwater and interception of surface water or run off water, and may connect into the underground pipes so as to rapidly divert surface water; it preferably has a cleanable filter to avoid migration of surface debris to the subterranean area that would clog the pipes.
Interceptor drain
Dispersal drain
This form distributes waste water that a septic tank emits.
Fin drain
This form comprises a subterranean perforated pipe from which extends perpendicularly upward along its length a thin vertical section, denominated the "fin", of aggregate material for drainage to the pipe. The length is 200 mm (7.9 in). This form is less expensive to build than a traditional French drain.

A French drain can end, i.e., open at a downhill slope, dry well, or rain garden where plants absorb and hold the drained water. This is useful if city water systems or other wastewater areas are unavailable.

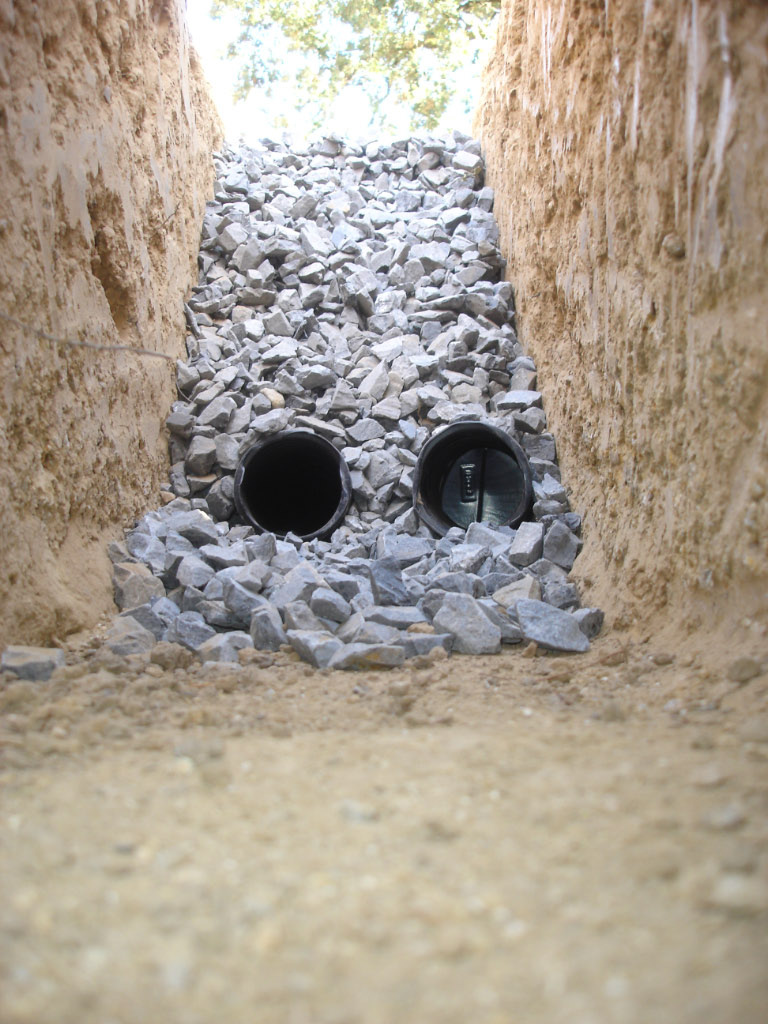
Cross-section view showing French drain with two underground pipes

Depending on the expected level and volume of rainwater or runoff, French drains can be widened or also fitted on two or three underground drainpipes. Multiple pipes also provide for redundancy, in case one pipe becomes overfilled or clogged by a rupture or defect in the piping. A pipe might become overfilled if it is on a side of the drain which receives a much larger volume of water, such as one pipe being closer to an uphill slope, or closer to a roofline that drips near the French drain. When a pipe becomes overfilled, water can seep sideways into a parallel pipe, as a form of load-balancing, so that neither pipe becomes slowed by air bubbles, as might happen in a full-pipe with no upper air space.

Filters are made from permeable materials, typically non-woven fabric, may include sand and gravel, placed around the drainage pipe or envelope to restrict migration ofnon-colloidal particles from the surrounding soils. Envelopes are the gravel, stone, rock, or surrounding pipe. These are permeable materials placed around pipe or drainage products to improve flow conditions in the area immediately around the drain and for improving bedding and structural backfill conditions.

== Installation ==
French drains are often installed around a home foundation in two ways:

- Buried around the external side of the foundation wall
- Installed underneath the basement floor on the inside perimeter of the basement

In most homes, an external French drain or drain tile is installed around the foundation walls before the soil is backfilled. It is laid on the bottom of the excavated area, and a layer of stone is laid on top. A filter fabric is often laid on top of the stone to keep fine sediments and particles from entering. Once the drain is installed, the area is backfilled, and the system is left alone until it clogs.

== Other uses ==
French drains can be used in farmers' fields for the tile drainage of waterlogged fields. Such fields are called "tiled". Weeping tiles can be used anywhere that soil needs to be drained.

Weeping tiles are used for the opposite reason in septic drain fields for septic tanks. Clarified sewage from the septic tank is fed into weeping tiles buried shallowly in the drain field. The weeping tile spreads the liquid throughout the drain field.

== Legislation ==
In the US, municipalities may require permits for building drainage systems as federal law requires water sent to storm drains to be free of specific contaminants and sediment.

== See also ==
- Dry well – Pit to allow surface waste water to drain
- Infiltration basin – Form of engineered sump or percolation pond
- Percolation trench – Drainage structure
- Rubble trench foundation – Foundation construction approach
- Sustainable drainage system – Designed to reduce the potential impact of development
- Tile drainage – Form of agricultural drainage system
