= Septic drain field =

Type of subsurface wastewater disposal facility

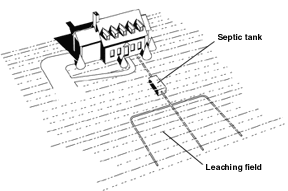
Septic tank and septic drain field

Septic drain fields, also called leach fields or leach drains, are subsurface wastewater disposal facilities used to remove contaminants and impurities from the liquid that emerges after anaerobic digestion in a septic tank. Organic materials in the liquid are catabolized by a microbial ecosystem.

A septic drain field, a septic tank, and associated piping compose a septic system.

The drain field typically consists of an arrangement of trenches containing perforated pipes and porous material (often gravel) covered by a layer of soil to prevent animals (and surface runoff) from reaching the wastewater distributed within those trenches. Primary design considerations are both hydraulic for the volume of wastewater requiring disposal and catabolic for the long-term biochemical oxygen demand of that wastewater. The land area that is set aside for the septic drain field may be called a septic reserve area (SRA).

Sewage farms similarly dispose of wastewater through a series of ditches and lagoons (often with little or no pre-treatment). These are more often found in arid countries as the waterflow on the surface allows for irrigation (and fertilization) of agricultural land.

== Design ==
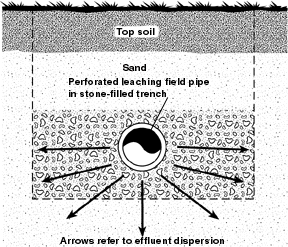
Cross-section of weeping tile and leach field

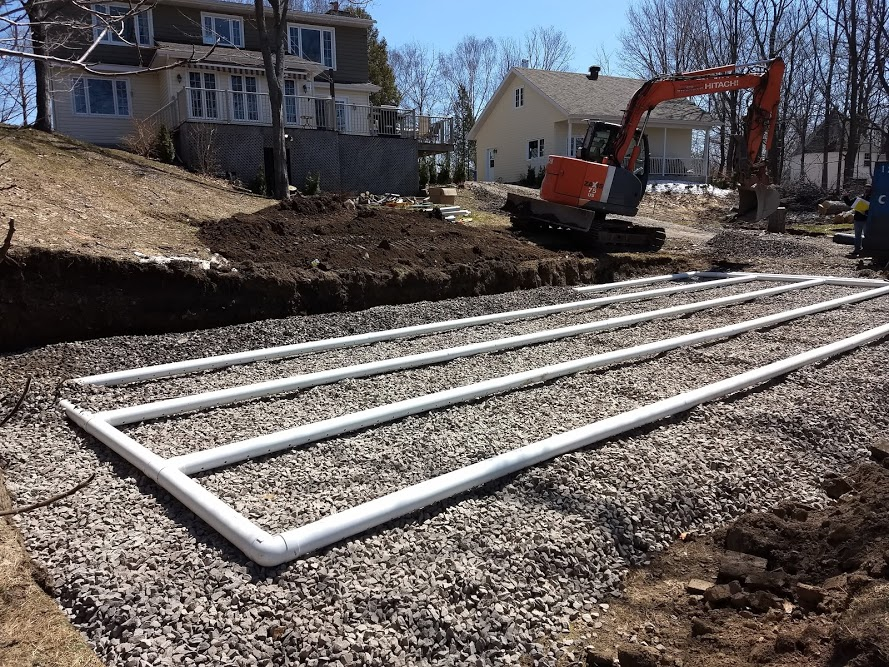
A drain field being installed

Many health departments require a percolation test ("perc" test) to determine the suitability of drain-field soil to receive septic tank effluent. An engineer, soil scientist, or licensed designer may be required to work with the local governing agency to design a system that conforms to these criteria.

Alternatively, where seasonal high water tables limit system sizing, health districts can size the leach field by relying on soil morphological features to determine how suitable the drain field soil is for receiving septic tank effluent. In this approach, the engineer or soil scientist evaluates soil characteristics, such as texture, structure, consistency, pore and root distribution, and color signatures left by water table fluctuation.

The goal of percolation testing is to ensure the soil is sufficiently permeable for septic tank effluent to percolate away from the drain field, yet fine-grained enough to detain pathogenic bacteria and viruses for soil treatment to occur. Aerobic soil conditions are needed to kill pathogens before they can travel far enough to reach a water well or surface water supply. Coarse soils, sand, and gravel can transmit wastewater away from the drain field before pathogens are destroyed. Silt and clay effectively filter out pathogens but limit wastewater flow rates. Percolation tests measure the rate at which clean water disperses through a disposal trench into the soil. Several factors may reduce observed percolation rates when the drain field receives anoxic septic tank effluent:

- Microbial colonies catabolizing soluble organic compounds from the septic tank effluent will adhere to soil particles and reduce the interstitial area available for water flow between soil particles. These colonies tend to form a low-permeability biofilm of gelatinous slime at the soil interface of the disposal trench.
- Insoluble particles small enough to be carried through the septic tank will accumulate at the soil interface of the disposal trench; non-biodegradable particles like synthetic fiber lint from laundry, mineral soil from washing, or bone and eggshell fragments from garbage disposals will remain to fill interstitial areas formerly available for water flow out of the trench.
- Cooking fats or petroleum products emulsified by detergents or dissolved by solvents can flow through prior to anaerobic liquefaction when septic tank volume is too small to offer adequate residence time and may congeal as a hydrophobic layer on the soil interface of the disposal trench.
- Rising groundwater levels may reduce the available hydraulic head (or vertical distance), causing gravitational water flow away from the disposal trench. Initially, effluent flowing downward from the disposal trench might encounter groundwater or impermeable rock or clay, requiring a directional shift to horizontal movement away from the drain field. A certain vertical distance is required between the effluent level in the disposal trench and the water level applicable when the effluent leaves the drain field for gravitational force to overcome viscous frictional forces resisting flow through porous soil. Effluent levels near the drain field will rise toward the ground surface to preserve that vertical distance difference if groundwater levels surrounding the drain field approach the effluent level in the disposal trench.
- Frozen ground may seasonally reduce the cross-sectional area available for flow or evaporation.

=== Catabolic design ===
Just as a septic tank is sized to support a community of anaerobic organisms capable of liquefying anticipated amounts of putrescible materials in wastewater, a drain field should be sized to support a community of aerobic soil microorganisms capable of decomposing the anaerobic septic tank's effluent into aerobic water. Hydrogen sulfide odors or iron bacteria may be observed in nearby wells or surface waters when effluent has not been completely oxidized before reaching those areas. The biofilm on the walls of the drain field trenches will use atmospheric oxygen in the trenches to catabolize organic compounds in septic tank effluent. Groundwater flow is laminar in the aquifer soils surrounding the drain field. Septic tank effluent with soluble organic compounds passing through the biofilm forms a mounded lens atop the groundwater underlying the drain field. Molecular diffusion controls the mixing of soluble organic compounds into the groundwater and the transport of oxygen from underlying groundwater or the capillary fringe of the groundwater surface to micro-organisms capable of catabolizing dissolved organic compounds remaining in the effluent plume.

=== Biofilter ===
When a septic tank is used in combination with a biofilter, the height and catabolic area of the drain field may be reduced. Biofilter technology may allow higher-density residential construction, minimal site disturbance, and more usable land for trees, swimming pools, or gardens. Adequate routine maintenance may reduce the chances of the drain field plugging up. The biofilter will not reduce the volume of liquid that must percolate into the soil, but it may reduce the oxygen demand of organic materials in that liquid.

== Operation and maintenance ==
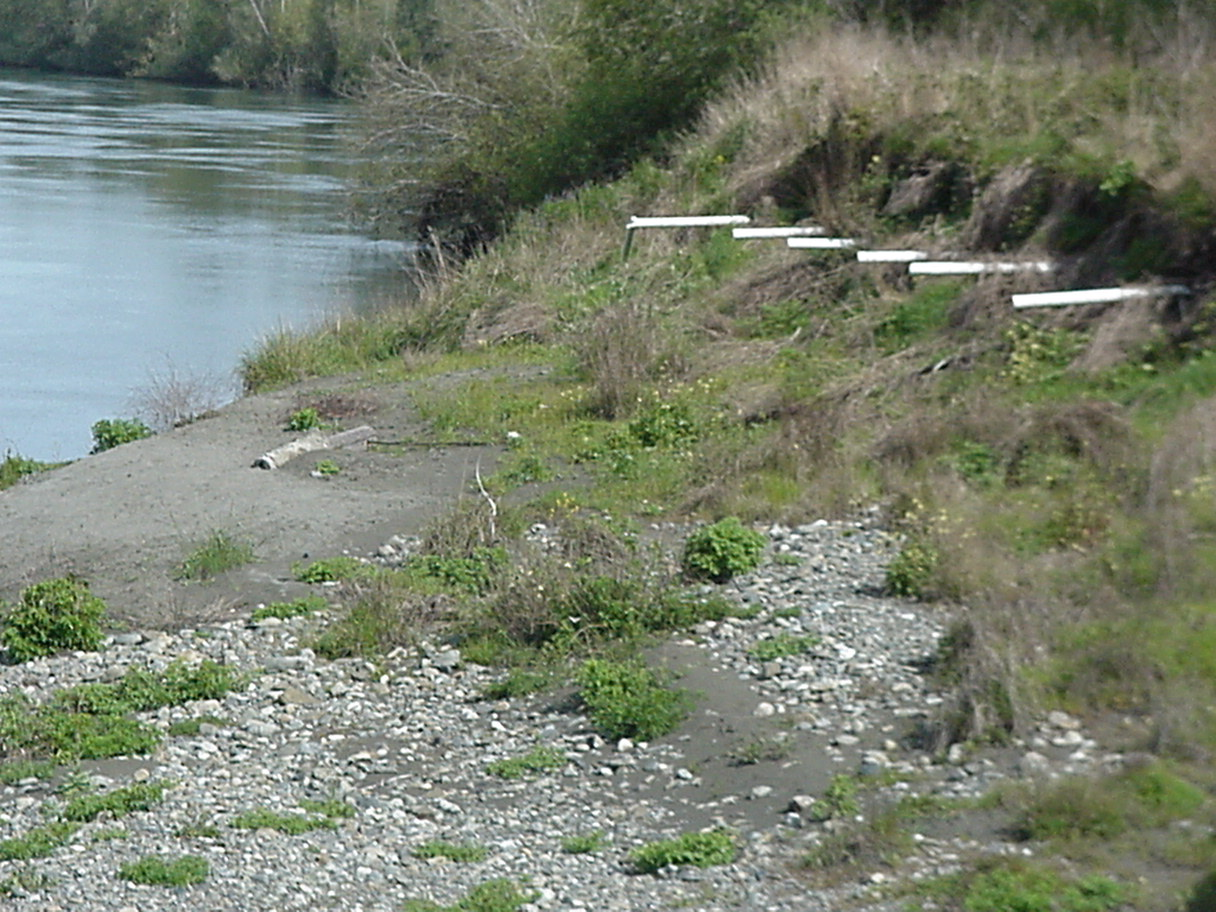
A septic drain field exposed by erosion

=== Dosing schedules or resting periods ===
A drain field may be designed to offer several separate disposal areas for effluent from a single septic tank. One area may be "rested" while effluent is routed to a different area. The nematode community in the resting drain field continues feeding on the accumulated biofilm and fats when the anaerobic septic tank effluent is no longer available. This natural cleansing process may reduce bioclogging to improve the hydraulic capacity of the field by increasing the available interstitial area of the soil as the accumulated organic material is oxidized. The percolation rate after resting may approach, but is unlikely to match, the original clean water percolation rate of the site.

=== Inappropriate wastes ===
Septic tank and drain field microorganisms have very limited capability for catabolizing petroleum products and chlorinated solvents, and cannot remove dissolved metals; however, some may be absorbed into septic tank sludge or drain field soils, and concentrations may be diluted by other groundwater in the vicinity of the drain field. Cleaning formulations may reduce drain field efficiency. Laundry bleach may slow or stop microbial activity in the drain field, and sanitizing or deodorizing chemicals may have similar effects. Detergents, solvents, and drain cleaners may transport emulsified, saponified or dissolved fats into the drain field before they can be catabolized into short-chain organic acids in the septic tank scum layer.

== See also ==
- Blackwater (waste)
- Cesspit
- Dry well
- French drain
- Groundwater pollution
- Leachate
- Onsite sewage facility
- Reuse of human excreta
- Sewer
- Sewage treatment
