= Dry well =

Pit to allow surface waste water to drain

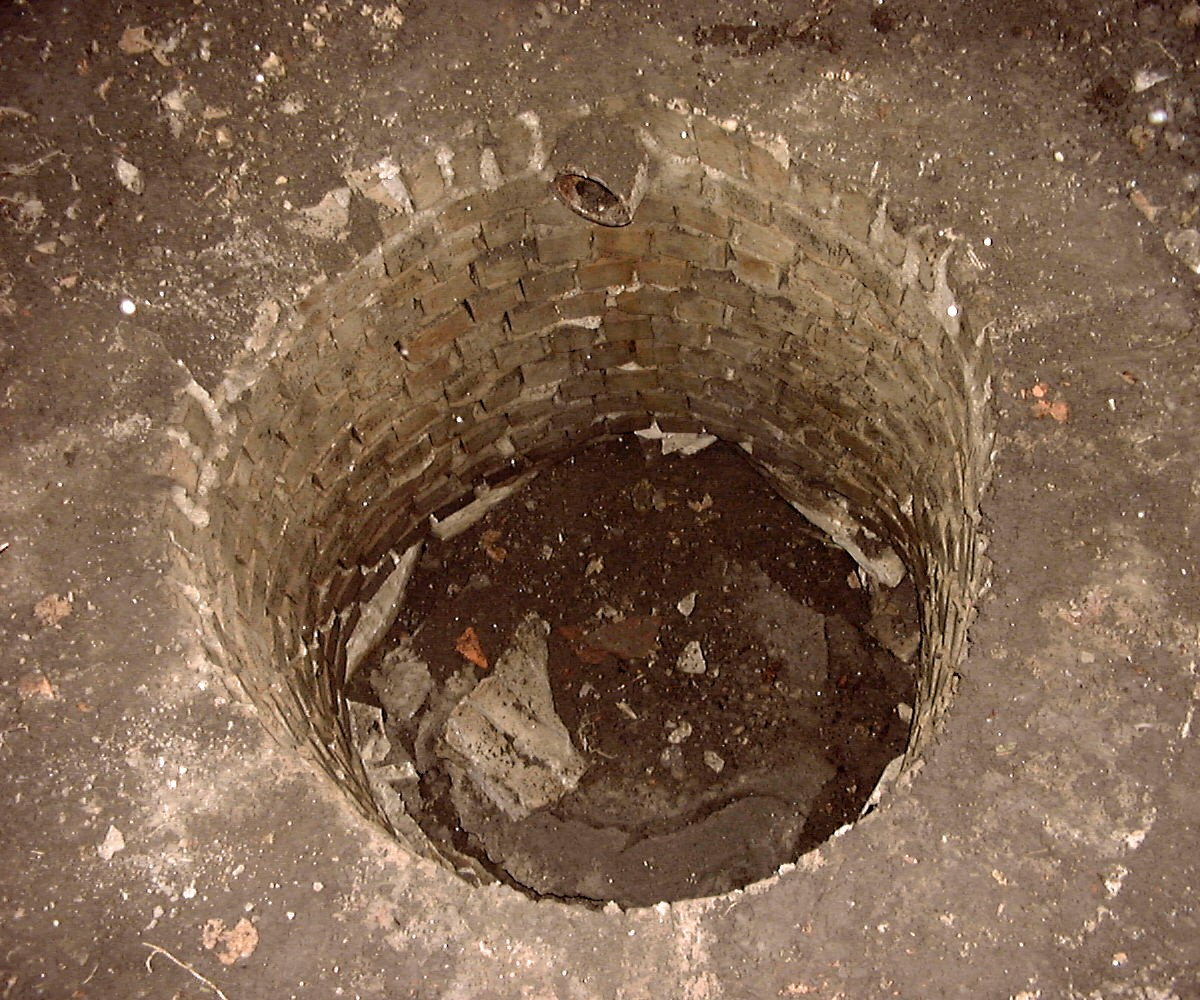
Old drywell

A dry well or soak is a structure formed underground that disposes of unwanted water, such as surface runoff water and stormwater. In this process, the water is infiltrated into the ground, further merging with groundwater in the local area. The way water flows in a dry well is through gravity. A dry well will typically have a chamber structure, or a deep pit covered with gravel. Dry wells may vary from simple to more advanced structures.

== Design ==
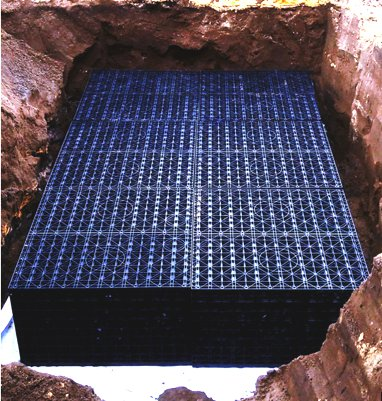
Polypropylene soakwell in Perth, Western Australia

When designing a dry well, there are requirements. Dry wells require optimal conditions prior to installing; they may not be installed where topographic conditions and soil are not at ideal standards. Dry wells should typically be anywhere from 30–100 feet deep, with a width of 3–6 feet at the surface. For safety cautions, the dry wells must be placed at a distance away from property lines, basements, and any foundations. Any plants or other structures should not be placed on top of a dry well in case of maintenance. Furthermore, when wanting to install a dry well it is highly recommended to consult with a professional.

Dry wells are excavated pits that may be filled with aggregate or air and are often lined with a perforated casing. The casings consist of perforated chambers made out of plastic or concrete and may be lined with geotextile. They provide high stormwater infiltration capacity while also having a relatively small footprint.

A dry well receives water from entry pipes at its top. It can be used as part of a stormwater drainage network, an agricultural well drainage system or on smaller scales such as collecting stormwater from building roofs. It is used in conjunction with pretreatment measures such as bioswales or sediment chambers to prevent groundwater contamination.

The depth of the dry well allows the water to penetrate soil layers with poor infiltration such as clays into more permeable layers of the vadose zone such as sand.

Simple dry wells consist of a pit filled with gravel, riprap, rubble, or other debris. Such pits resist collapse but do not have much storage capacity because their interior volume is mostly filled by stone. A more advanced dry well defines a large interior storage volume by a concrete or plastic chamber with perforated sides and bottom. These dry wells are usually buried completely so that they do not take up any land area. The dry wells for a parking lot's storm drains are usually buried below the same parking lot.

Dry wells pros and cons include:

Pros: low cost, small footprint, construction is rapid.

Cons: difficult to maintain when clogged, cannot be pumped to extract groundwater, is dependent on permeable soil that allows infiltration of stormwater.

== Related concepts ==
A sump in a basement can be built in dry well form, allowing the sump pump to cycle less frequently (handling only occasional peak demand). A discharge line may also be placed to help discharge water that is propelled by the sump pump, driving out of the basement and further away from the foundation. A French drain can resemble a horizontal dry well that is not covered. A larger open pit or artificial swale that receives stormwater and dissipates it into the ground is called an infiltration basin or recharge basin. In places where the amount of water to be dispersed is not as large, a rain garden can be used instead.

A covered pit that disposes of the water component of sewage by the same principle as a dry well is called a cesspool. A septic drain field operates on the same slow-drain/large-area principle as an infiltration basin.

== See also ==
- Landscape architecture – Design of outdoor public areas, landmarks, and structures
- Orphan wells – Disused oil or gas wells
- Septic tank – Method for basic wastewater treatment (on-site)
- Stormwater – Water that originates during precipitation events and snow/ice melt
