= Petroleum microbiology =

Petroleum microbiology is a branch of microbiology that deals with the study of microorganisms that can metabolize or alter crude or refined petroleum products. These microorganisms, also called hydrocarbonoclastic microorganisms, can degrade hydrocarbons and, include a wide distribution of bacteria, methanogenic archaea, and some fungi. Not all hydrocarbonoclasic microbes depend on hydrocarbons to survive, but instead may use petroleum products as alternative carbon and energy sources. Interest in this field is growing due to the increasing use of bioremediation of oil spills.

== Applications ==
=== Bioremediation ===
Bioremediation of oil contaminated soils, marine waters and oily sludges in situ is a feasible process as hydrocarbon degrading microorganisms are ubiquitous and are able to degrade most compounds in petroleum oil. In the simplest case, indigenous microbial communities can degrade the petroleum where the spill occurs. In more complicated cases, various methods of adding nutrients, air, or exogenous microorganisms to the contaminated site can be applied. For example, bioreactors involve the application of both natural and additional microorganisms in controlled growth conditions that yields high biodegradation rates and can be used with a wide range of media.

Crude oils are composed of an array of chemical compounds, minor constituents, and trace metals. Making up 50-98% of these petroleum products are hydrocarbons with saturated, unsaturated, or aromatic structures which influence their biodegradability by hydronocarbonclasts. The rate of uptake and biodegradation by these hydrocarbon-oxidizing microbes not only depend on the chemical structure of the substrates, but is limited by biotic and abiotic factors such as temperature, salinity, and nutrient availability in the environment.

==== Alcanivorax borkumensis ====
A model microorganism studied for its role in bioremediation of oil-spill sites and hydrocarbon catabolism is the alpha-proteobacteria Alcanivorax, which degrades aliphatic alkanes through various metabolic activities. Alcanivorax borkumensis utilizes linear hydrocarbon chains in petroleum as its primary energy source under aerobic conditions. When further supplied with sufficient limiting nutrients such as nitrogen and phosphor, it grows and produces surfactant glucolipids to help reduce surface water tension and enhance hydrocarbon uptake.[5] For this reason, nitrates and phosphates are often commercially added to oil-spill sites to engage quiescent populations of A. borkumensis, allowing them to quickly outcompete other microbial populations and become the dominant species in the oil-infested environment.

The addition of rate-limiting nutrients promotes the microbe's biodegrading pathways, including upregulation of genes encoding multiple alkane hydroxylases that oxidize various lengths of linear alkanes. These enzymes essentially remove the problematic hydrocarbon constituents of petroleum oil while A. borkumensis simultaneously increases synthesis of anionic glucoproteins, which are used to emulsify hydrocarbons in the environment and increase their bioavailability. The presence of crude oil along with appropriate levels of nitrogen and phosphor catalyzes the removal of petroleum either by mechanisms that enhance the efficiency of substrate uptake or by direct biodegradation of aliphatic chains.

==== Commercial applications ====
Two well-known oil spills exemplify large scale marine bioremediation applications:

In 1989, the Exxon Valdez ran aground, spilling 41.6 million liters of crude oil, and launching one of the first major bioremediation efforts for an oil spill. Cleanup of Alaskan shorelines relied in part on fertilizer application to augment bacterial growth.

In 2010, the BP Deepwater Horizon oil spill released 779 million liters of oil into the Gulf of Mexico. This was the largest oil spill of all time and indigenous petroleum microorganisms played a major role in petroleum degradation and cleanup.

=== Biosurfactants ===
These are microbial-synthesized surface-active substances that allow for more efficient microbial biodegradation of hydrocarbons in bioremediation processes. There are two ways by which biosurfactants are involved in bioremediation. (1) Increase the surface area of hydrophobic water-insoluble substrates. Growth of microbes on hydrocarbons can be limited by available surface area of the water-oil interface. Emulsifiers produced by microbes can break up oil into smaller droplets, effectively increasing the available surface area. (2) Increase the bioavailability of hydrophobic water-insoluble substrates. Biosurfactants can enhance the availability of bound substrates by desorbing them from surfaces (e.g. soil) or by increasing their apparent solubility. Some biosurfactants have low critical micelle concentrations (CMCs), a property which increases the apparent solubility of hydrocarbons by sequestering hydrophobic molecules into the centres of micelles.

=== Oil Recovery ===
Microbial enhanced oil recovery (MEOR) is a technology in which microbial environments are manipulated to enhance oil recovery. Nutrients are injected in situ into porous media and indigenous or added microbes promote growth and/or generate products that mobilize oil into producing wells. Alternatively, oil-mobilizing products can be produced by fermentation and injected into the reservoir. Various products and microorganisms are useful in these applications and each will yield different results. The two general strategies for enhancing oil recovery are altering the surface properties of the interface and using bioclogging to change the flow behavior. Biomass, biosurfactants, biopolymers, solvents, acids, and gases are some of the products that are added to oil reservoirs to enhance recovery. Other resources for this application:

=== Biosensors ===
Microbial biosensors identify and quantify target compounds of interest through interactions with the microbes. For example, bacteria may be used to identify a pollutant by monitoring their response to the specific chemical. The biosensor system may simply use bacterial growth as a pollutant indicator, or rely on genetic assays wherein a reporter gene is induced by the chemical.

Many analytical techniques require expensive treatment of soil samples and/or expensive equipment to detect the presence of pollutants. Bacterial biosensor systems offer the potential for cheap, robust detection systems that are selective and highly sensitive. One developed system uses Pseudomonas fluorescens HK44 to quantitatively assay for naphthalene using bioluminescence.

== Challenges ==
Often in the process of degrading a pollutant, a microbe can create intermediates or byproducts that are also harmful, sometimes even more harmful than the original substrate. For example, some microbes produce hydrogen sulfide as a byproduct in the degradation of certain petroleum hydrocarbons and if those gases are not detoxified before escaping the system, they can be released into the atmosphere.

== Biodegradation pathways ==
The pathways of degradation of different petroleum products vary depending on the substrate and the microorganism (i.e. aerobic/anaerobic). Specific degradation pathways of many hydrocarbon compounds can be found on the University of Minnesota Biocatalysis/Biodegradation Database.
