= Alcanivorax pacificus =

Scientific classification
- Domain: Bacteria
- Kingdom: Pseudomonadati
- Phylum: Pseudomonadota
- Class: Gammaproteobacteria
- Order: Oceanospirillales
- Family: Alcanivoracaceae
- Genus: Alcanivorax
- Species: A. pacificus

Binomial name
- Alcanivorax pacificus Lai et al. 2011

Species of bacterium

Alcanivorax pacificus is a pyrene-degrading marine gammaproteobacterium. It is of the genus Alcanivorax, a group of marine bacteria known for degrading hydrocarbons. When originally proposed, the genus Alcanivorax comprised six distinguishable species. However, A. pacificus, a seventh strain, was isolated from deep sea sediments in the West Pacific Ocean by Shanghai Majorbio Bio-pharm Technology Co., Ltd. in 2011. A. pacificus’s ability to degrade hydrocarbons can be employed for cleaning up oil-contaminated oceans through bioremediation. The genomic differences present in this strain of Alcanivorax that distinguish it from the original consortium are important to understand to better utilize this bacteria for bioremediation.

== Characteristics ==
A. pacificus is a non-motile, Gram-negative bacillus. It is oxidase- and catalase-positive. It forms light grey colonies that are between 1 and 2 millimeters in diameter when grown on 216L marine agar medium containing seawater, sodium acetate, tryptone, yeast extract, ammonium nitrate, and sodium citrate. A. pacificus is mesophilic and moderately halophilic, growing best in an environment between 10 and 42 degrees Celsius that contains 0.5-12% NaCl.

== Genome ==
Shanghai Majorbio Bio-pharm Technology Co., Ltd. sequenced a total of 5,855,964 paired ends of A. pacificus using Solexa paired-end sequencing technology. The obtained type strain of A. pacificus is W11-5^{T} (=MCCC 1A00474^{T} =CCTCC AB 208236^{T} =LMG 25514^{T}). The GC-content of strain W11-5 ^{T} is 62.62%. Strain W11-5^{T} is made of 42 contigs (N_{90} = 19) of 4,137,438 bp.

Results from automatic gene annotation, which was completed by the NCBI Prokaryotic Genomes Automatic Annotation Pipeline (PGAAP), revealed that the genome of strain W11-5^{T} contains 3,762 candidate protein-encoding genes. Out of these genes, 2,870 proteins were assigned to orthologous groups. Additionally identified were 41 tRNA genes for 19 amino acids and one 16S-23S-5S rRNA operon.

Particularly close attention was paid to genes that potentially coded for alkane degradation. Found were genes encoding for four integral-membrane alkane monooxygenases, three cytochrome P450 enzymes, and four genes encoding flavin-binding family monooxygenases. These monooxygenases are especially important, as they account for long-chain n-alkane hydroxylation.

== Diversity ==
A. Pacificus is closely related to other strains in the genus Alcanivorax. It shares 16S rRNA gene sequence similarities of 93.9, 93.1, 93.1, 93.0, 93.0 and 92.9% with neighboring strains A. dieselolei B-5 ^{T}, A. balearicus MACL04 ^{T}, A. hongdengensis A-11-3 ^{T}, A. venustensis ISO4 ^{T}, A. borkumensis SK2 ^{T} and A. jadensis T9 ^{T} respectively. However, as the gene sequence of A. Pacificus diverges more than 3% from all other strains, it is different enough to represent a novel bacterial strain. Part of this difference results from a 549 nucleotide fragment of the alkane hydroxylase gene alkB, which was amplified from the strand W11-5^{T}. The gene alkB is a protein that is produced by A. pacificus and other strains in the genus Alcanivorax that reverses the damage of alkylation, the process by which an alkane missing one hydrogen is transferred from one molecule to another. The amino acid sequences deduced from this fragment show that there is not a clear grouping between the species of Alcanivorax, as some strains within this genus contain multiple alkB sequences, which places them on different branches of the phylogenetic tree.
