= Alcanivorax dieselolei =

Scientific classification
- Domain: Bacteria
- Kingdom: Pseudomonadati
- Phylum: Pseudomonadota
- Class: Gammaproteobacteria
- Order: Oceanospirillales
- Family: Alcanivoracaceae
- Genus: Alcanivorax
- Species: A. dieselolei

Binomial name
- Alcanivorax dieselolei Liu and Shao 2005

Species of bacterium

Alcanivorax dieselolei is a marine bacterium in the class Gammaproteobacteria known for its ability to degrade petroleum hydrocarbons. It belongs to a group of specialized microorganisms called hydrocarbonoclastic bacteria, which use oil-derived compounds as their primary source of carbon and energy. Species of Alcanivorax are widely distributed in marine environments but are typically present at low abundance under normal conditions. Following oil contamination, however, A. dieselolei can rapidly increase in number and become one of the dominant bacterial species in affected waters.

This species is able to utilize a broad range of alkanes, which allows it to play a major role in the breakdown of petroleum in marine ecosystems. Because of this, A. dieselolei is considered an important contributor to the natural attenuation of oil pollution and has been widely studied in the context of marine bioremediation.

== Discovery and Isolation ==
Research on the Alcanivorax species isolation began in the late 1990s, but the first strain of the Alcanivorax dieselolei species was discovered and isolated from the surface waters of Bohai Sea in China in 2001 from a dock that had suffered from long-term crude oil pollution. Since its initial discovery, various strains of Alcanivorax dieselolei have been isolated and discovered around the world. These environments have diverse geographic distributions, including coastal and pelagic sea regions, surface seawaters to increasing depths, tropical to polar areas, and in both clean and polluted areas.

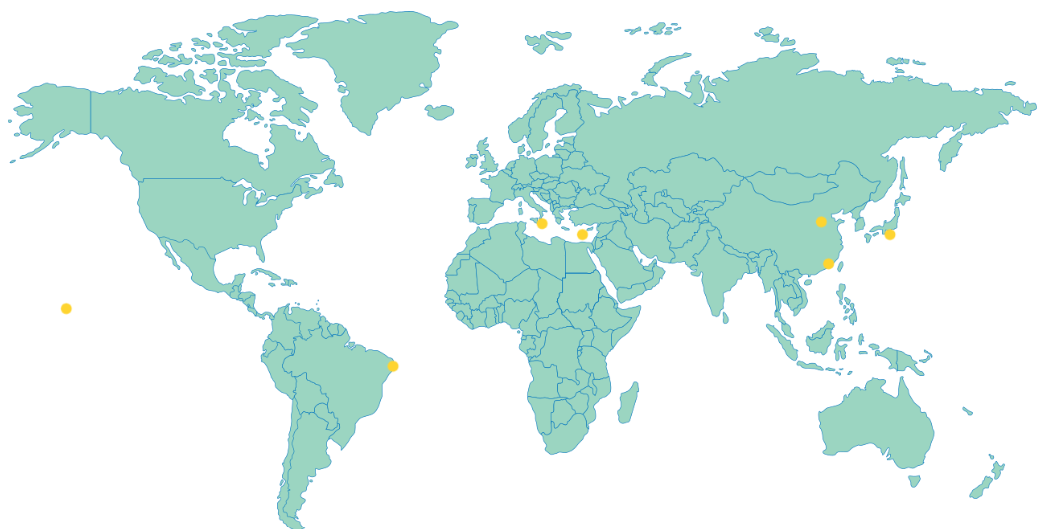
Distribution map of key isolated Alcanivorax dieselolei strains.

Key Strain Isolations
Strain	Location	Date Recorded	Extra Description
B-5^{t}	Oil-contaminated surface sea water at the Yellow River dock of Shengli oilfield, Bohai Sea, China	November, 2001	Dock has suffered from crude oil pollution
NO1A	Deep-sea sediment of east Pacific Ocean nodule region A station (7°13′46″N 153°52′19″W, 5027m water depth)	2001	
B-5^{t}	Subtropical seawater of Xiamen Island, China	June, 2005	
N1203	Isolated from consortia of ammonia-oxidizing bacteria in organically enriched marine sediment from Ago Bay in Mie prefecture, Japan	2008	Narrow substrate range for growth
B-5^{t}	Mucus of zoanthid palythoa caribaeorum at Porto de Galinhas on coast of Pernambuco State, Brazil	May, 2010	First recorded strain from Atlantic Ocean
KS-293	Surface waters of Eastern Mediterranean Sea (34°42′E 34°00′N)	2013	
PON-SEA-05 PON-SEA-07	Bilge water sample from Messina, Sicily	December, 2014	Strain is 99% related to B-5. High presence in ship-polluted areas.

== Environment Conditions and Laboratory Culture ==
Alcanivorax dieselolei is a halophilic, aerobic bacterium that utilizes alkane degradation as its primary energy and carbon source. In natural environments and findings from laboratory research, Alcanivorax dieselolei grow across temperature ranges from approximately 4–55 °C, with optimal temperatures 25–30 °C. The species usually thrives under neutral to slightly alkaline conditions from around 7.0–7.5 pH. In natural environments, Alcanivorax dieselolei is found throughout the water column, from surface waters to deep-sea sediments, and even in regions impacted by hydrocarbon pollution, demonstrating its ecological versatility and adaptability across habitats.

Under laboratory settings, common media that were used to cultivate Alcanivorax dieselolei strains include ONR7a, BH, ASM and SM1 to mimic seawater composition with oil-based carbon sources added. NaCl is required for growth, where the optimum is 3–10%, yet survival in broader ranges of 1–15% has also been reported, reflecting its halophilic nature. As Alcanivorax dieselolei is also a strictly aerobic bacteria that requires oxygen for alkane metabolism, they are cultivated in shakers at 150–200 rpm to maintain aeration.

== Morphology and Physiology ==
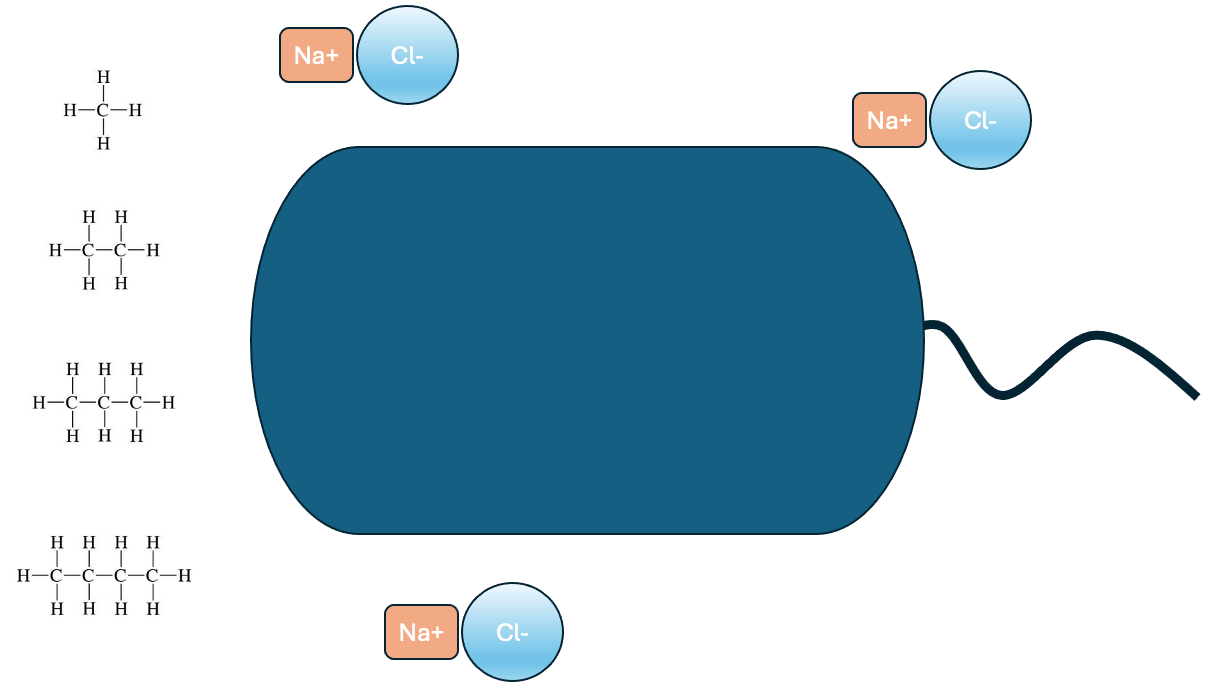
Schematic of Alcanivorax dieselolei: Rod-shaped marine bacterium shown with flagellum for motility, surrounded by alkanes as primary carbon sources and salt ions representing its halophilic habitat.

Alcanivorax dieselolei is a gram-negative, aerobic marine bacterium from the γ-proteobacteria class which uses hydrocarbons for its energy and carbon source. Since the non-spore-forming bacterium is considered an obligate marine hydrocarbonoclastic bacteria, it contains machinery for alkane degradation and doesn't assimilate most sugars or amino acids. The rod-shaped cells measure between 0.8–2.0 μm in length and 0.3–0.7 μm in width. Under SEM and TEM, the cell is also described as spherical and between 0.44–0.49 μm. The species is halophilic and adapted to marine environments, requiring 3.0–7.5% NaCl for optimum growth with a preference for slightly alkaline and moderate temperature (optimal 28 °C) environments. Cells are inhibited at pH of 5 or temperatures higher than 40 °C. It is also catalase- and oxidase-positive.

In terms of motility, the species uses a lophotrichous flagella which is a cluster of flagella. However, under transmission electron microscopy, A. diselolei had a single flagellum. This flagellar motility was found to play a role in adhesion and colonization of plastic substrates.

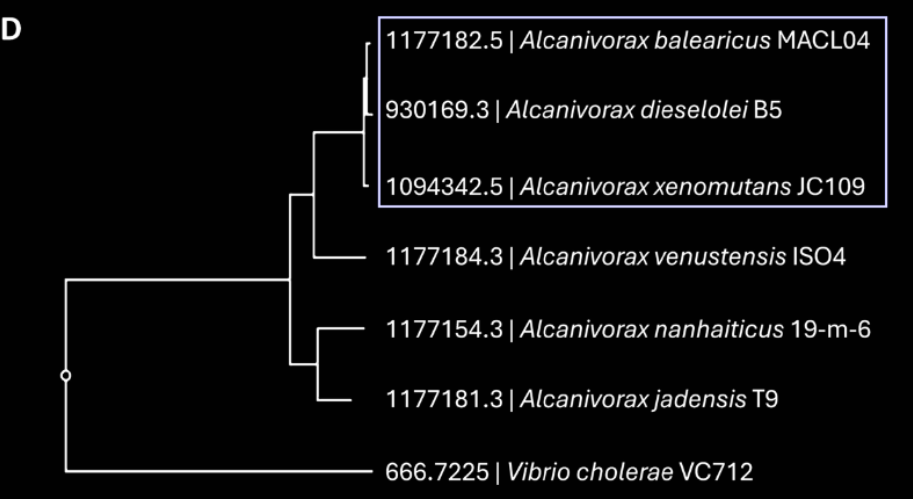
Phylogenetic grouping of species which rapidly colonize bacteria using codon tree analysis of 500 genes.

The cells demonstrate hydrophobicity which may improve adhesion to plastic and oil surfaces. When polymer colonization was investigated across different Alcanivorax species, rapid colonization corresponded with phylogenetic relatedness. Furthermore, A. dieselolei exhibits phenotypic plasticity as surface-attached cells can elongate when photo-weathered plastic is used as a substrate.

Biochemical characteristics of Alcanivorax dieselolei
Property	Results
Glucose Fermentation	Negative
Denitrification	Positive
Catalase activity	Positive
Oxidase activity	Positive
Gelatin liquefaction	Negative
Tweenase	Positive
Agarose activity	Negative
Gelatinase activity	Negative
Amylase activity	Negative
Arginine dihydrolase	Negative

== Molecular Biology ==
=== Alkane Degradation & Regulation ===
In Alcanivorax dieselolei, genes involved in alkane degradation are regulated based on the availability of hydrocarbons in the environment. When alkanes are present, the bacterium activates genes needed for their breakdown. When they are absent, these genes are downregulated, helping conserve energy.

This process is controlled by regulatory proteins that respond to hydrocarbon substrates and coordinate the expression of multiple genes involved in alkane uptake and oxidation. These regulators allow the bacterium to quickly respond to changing environmental conditions, such as the sudden presence of oil following a spill. Further, hydrocarbon degradation is mediated by multiple alkane hydroxylase systems, such as AlkB1, AlkB2, CYP153, and AlmA. These enzymes collectively enable the oxidation of n-alkanes spanning approximately C5 to C36, with distinct chain-length preferences among the different systems.

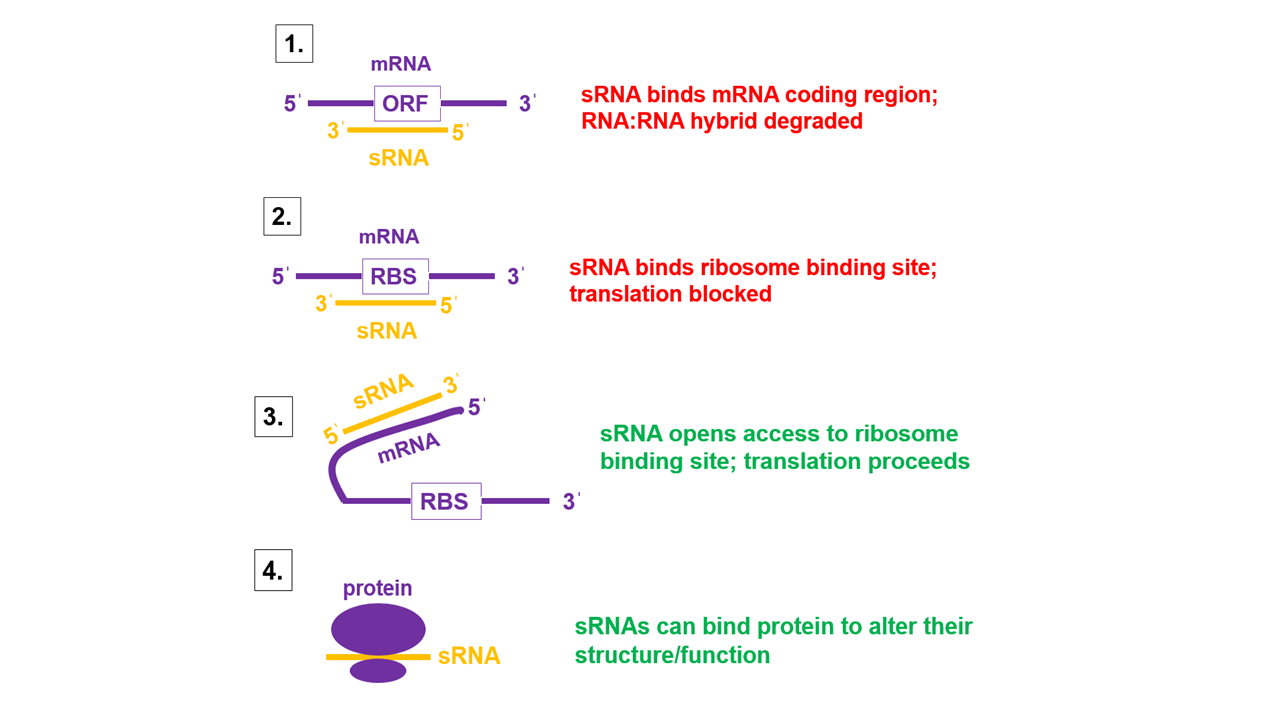
Process of Small RNAs (sRNAs) regulating gene expression by binding to mRNA and blocking translation or causing its degradation.

Small regulatory RNAs (sRNAs) also contribute to this control by influencing gene expression after transcription. They can affect how much protein is produced from specific genes, allowing for more precise adjustment of metabolic activity. Together, these mechanisms help A. dieselolei efficiently regulate its hydrocarbon degradation pathways in marine environments. sRNAs bind to specific mRNA molecules and either block their translation or promote their degradation, while refining expression of alkane degradation during fast shifts of hydrocarbon availability.

In the B-5 strain, genome-wide transcriptomic analyses demonstrated a diverse set of sRNAs from intergenic regions, antisense strands, and processed transcripts. Computational predictions and expression analyses suggest that sRNAs form extensive regulatory networks with their target mRNAs, enabling coordinated control of metabolic responses under alkane growth conditions. In addition to pathway-specific regulation, some sRNAs also interact with global regulators such as CsrA, indicating broader roles in regulating cellular metabolism.

Additionally, other than hydrocarbon degradation, Alcanivorax dieselolei strains have shown properties with enzymatic activity to degrade aliphatic polyesters such as PHB, PCL, and related synthetic polymers.

== Ecological Role ==
=== Role in Marine Oil-Contaminated Environments ===
Alcanivorax dieselolei plays an important role in oil-contaminated marine environments. This bacterium is known for its ability to degrade hydrocarbon chains. Alkane, a major component of petroleum, is composed of the hydrocarbon chain, and this characteristic of the alkane allows Alcanivorax dieselolei to degrade the compound and use it as a source of carbon and energy. This ability gives this bacterium its important ecological role in the breakdown of oil-derived compounds in marine environments.

=== Why It Becomes Abundant After Oil Spills ===
The main component of petroleum is the alkane. Oil spills provide a large supply of alkanes to the marine environment, which Alcanivorax species are especially good at utilizing for growth. Alcanivorax-related bacteria became abundant and dominant in petroleum-contaminated seawater when the limiting nutrients, nitrogen and phosphorus, were available. The dominant Alcanivorax populations in oil-contaminated seawater exhibit broad specificity for alkane substrates. Therefore, Alcanivorax dieselolei do not always proliferate in large quantities, but rather appear to thrive under conditions favorable to the rapid utilization of hydrocarbons.

=== Importance Of A Marine Oil Degrader ===
Alcanivorax dieselolei is considered an important marine oil degrader because it can break down alkanes, which are major components of petroleum. This ability allows the bacterium to contribute to the natural removal of oil-containing compounds from marine environments. It is found in seawater and deep-sea sediment showing its relevance to hydrocarbon-affected marine environments.

Alcanivorax dieselolei can degrade a broad range of alkanes from C5 to C36, and genome analysis identified genes linked to alkane degradation. They have multiple alkane hydroxylase systems, which help it oxidize different hydrocarbon compounds and contribute to their ability to degrade petroleum-containing alkanes.

=== Association Discovered In Coral Reefs ===
Alcanivorax dieselolei has also been seen in a reef environment through its association with the mucus of the zoanthid Palythoa caribaeorum in Porto de Galinhas, Brazil. This discovery is significant because Alcanivorax dieselolei was found only in connections with oil-polluted seawater and hydrocarbon degradation, rather than with organisms. This finding suggested that this bacterium may exist in certain coral reed-associated microbial communities. However, this evidence only indicates the species detection of coral polypol slime, rather than proving it is a dominant or widespread bacterium in coral reef organisms.

== Applications ==
=== Bioremediation: Oil Degradation ===
Alcanivorax dieselolei has made our attention for bioremediation because it can use petroleum-containing hydrocarbons, like alkanes, as sources of carbon and energy for growth and reproduction. The species was first described as a marine alkane-degrading bacterium isolated from seawater and deep-sea sediment. Later work on strain B5 showed that it can degrade a broad range of n-alkanes, from C5 to C36 and that its genome contains genes associated with alkane degradation. These traits make the species special to the natural breakdown of oil pollution in marine environments and to helping to clean up after oil spills.

=== Biotechnology ===
Alcanivorax dieselolei has potential applications in biotechnology due to its ability to produce biosurfactants and degrade a wide range of compounds. The species has been reported to produce N-acyl amino acid biosurfactants, which help break down hydrophobic substances by increasing their availability in water. This makes them useful in processes such as microbial enhanced oil recovery. The bacterium also contains enzyme systems involved in hydrocarbon degradation, including AlkB, CYP153, and AlmA, which can be used in biocatalysis to transform hydrocarbon-based compounds. A. dieselolei has shown the ability to degrade synthetic polyesters such as polyhydroxybutyrate (PHB) and polycaprolactone (PCL), suggesting possible applications in plastic biodegradation.

=== Model Research Organism ===
The B5 strain of Alcanivorax dieselolei has become an important model organism for studying marine hydrocarbon degradation because its genetic and physiological characteristics have been well studied. B5, as the model strain of this species, has been used in studies on alkane degradation, genome sequencing, hydrocarbon sensing pathways, and biosurfactant production. Studies of this strain have shown a variety of alkane hydroxylases and a detailed long-chain alkane metabolic network, making it a useful system for understanding how marine bacteria detect, transport, and degrade petroleum-containing compounds More studies have continued to use B5 as a model system for investigating the molecular mechanisms of alkane degradation in marine bacteria. Researchers used high-resolution small RNA profiling in Alcanivorax dieselolei B5 under alkane and non-alkane conditions to examine regulatory responses involved in alkane adaptation.
