= Alcanivorax mobilis =

Scientific classification
- Domain: Bacteria
- Kingdom: Pseudomonadati
- Phylum: Pseudomonadota
- Class: Gammaproteobacteria
- Order: Oceanospirillales
- Family: Alcanivoracaceae
- Genus: Alcanivorax
- Species: A. mobilis

Binomial name
- Alcanivorax mobilis Yang et al. 2018

Type strain
- KCTC 52985, MCCC 1A11581, strain MT13131

Species of bacterium

Alcanivorax mobilis is a Gram-negative, hydrocarbon-degrading and motile bacterium from the genus of Alcanivorax which has been isolated from deep-sea sediments from the Indian Ocean.
