= Alcanivorax gelatiniphagus =

Scientific classification
- Domain: Bacteria
- Kingdom: Pseudomonadati
- Phylum: Pseudomonadota
- Class: Gammaproteobacteria
- Order: Oceanospirillales
- Family: Alcanivoracaceae
- Genus: Alcanivorax
- Species: A. gelatiniphagus

Binomial name
- Alcanivorax gelatiniphagus Kyoung kwon et al. 2015

Type strain
- JCM 18425, KCCM 42990, MEBiC08158

Species of bacterium

Alcanivorax gelatiniphagus is a Gram-negative and rod-shaped bacterium from the genus of Alcanivorax which has been isolated from tidal flat sediments from Taean County in Korea.
