= Microbial biodegradation =

Method of removing pollutants

Microbial biodegradation is the use of bioremediation and biotransformation methods to harness the naturally occurring ability of microbial xenobiotic metabolism to degrade, transform or accumulate environmental pollutants, including hydrocarbons (e.g. oil), polychlorinated biphenyls (PCBs), polyaromatic hydrocarbons (PAHs), heterocyclic compounds (such as pyridine or quinoline), pharmaceutical substances, radionuclides and metals.

Interest in the microbial biodegradation of pollutants has intensified in recent years, and recent major methodological breakthroughs have enabled detailed genomic, metagenomic, proteomic, bioinformatic and other high-throughput analyses of environmentally relevant microorganisms, providing new insights into biodegradative pathways and the ability of organisms to adapt to changing environmental conditions.

Biological processes play a major role in the removal of contaminants and take advantage of the catabolic versatility of microorganisms to degrade or convert such compounds. In environmental microbiology, genome-based global studies are increasing the understanding of metabolic and regulatory networks, as well as providing new information on the evolution of degradation pathways and molecular adaptation strategies to changing environmental conditions.

== Aerobic biodegradation of pollutants ==
The increasing amount of bacterial genomic data provides new opportunities for understanding the genetic and molecular bases of the degradation of organic pollutants. Aromatic compounds are among the most persistent of these pollutants and lessons can be learned from the recent genomic studies of Burkholderia xenovorans LB400 and Rhodococcus sp. strain RHA1, two of the largest bacterial genomes completely sequenced to date. These studies have helped expand our understanding of bacterial catabolism, non-catabolic physiological adaptation to organic compounds, and the evolution of large bacterial genomes. First, the metabolic pathways from phylogenetically diverse isolates are very similar with respect to overall organization. Thus, as originally noted in pseudomonads, a large number of "peripheral aromatic" pathways funnel a range of natural and xenobiotic compounds into a restricted number of "central aromatic" pathways. Nevertheless, these pathways are genetically organized in genus-specific fashions, as exemplified by the b-ketoadipate and Paa pathways. Comparative genomic studies further reveal that some pathways are more widespread than initially thought. Thus, the Box and Paa pathways illustrate the prevalence of non-oxygenolytic ring-cleavage strategies in aerobic aromatic degradation processes. Functional genomic studies have been useful in establishing that even organisms harboring high numbers of homologous enzymes seem to contain few examples of true redundancy. For example, the multiplicity of ring-cleaving dioxygenases in certain rhodococcal isolates may be attributed to the cryptic aromatic catabolism of different terpenoids and steroids. Finally, analyses have indicated that recent genetic flux appears to have played a more significant role in the evolution of some large genomes, such as LB400's, than others. However, the emerging trend is that the large gene repertoires of potent pollutant degraders such as LB400 and RHA1 have evolved principally through more ancient processes. That this is true in such phylogenetically diverse species is remarkable and further suggests the ancient origin of this catabolic capacity.

== Anaerobic biodegradation of pollutants ==
Anaerobic microbial mineralization of recalcitrant organic pollutants is of great environmental significance and involves intriguing novel biochemical reactions. In particular, hydrocarbons and halogenated compounds have long been doubted to be degradable in the absence of oxygen, but the isolation of hitherto unknown anaerobic hydrocarbon-degrading and reductively dehalogenating bacteria during the last decades provided ultimate proof for these processes in nature. While such research involved mostly chlorinated compounds initially, recent studies have revealed reductive dehalogenation of bromine and iodine moieties in aromatic pesticides. Other reactions, such as biologically induced abiotic reduction by soil minerals, has been shown to deactivate relatively persistent aniline-based herbicides far more rapidly than observed in aerobic environments. Many novel biochemical reactions were discovered enabling the respective metabolic pathways, but progress in the molecular understanding of these bacteria was rather slow, since genetic systems are not readily applicable for most of them. However, with the increasing application of genomics in the field of environmental microbiology, a new and promising perspective is now at hand to obtain molecular insights into these new metabolic properties. Several complete genome sequences were determined during the last few years from bacteria capable of anaerobic organic pollutant degradation. The ~4.7 Mb genome of the facultative denitrifying Aromatoleum aromaticum strain EbN1 was the first to be determined for an anaerobic hydrocarbon degrader (using toluene or ethylbenzene as substrates). The genome sequence revealed about two dozen gene clusters (including several paralogs) coding for a complex catabolic network for anaerobic and aerobic degradation of aromatic compounds. The genome sequence forms the basis for current detailed studies on regulation of pathways and enzyme structures. Further genomes of anaerobic hydrocarbon degrading bacteria were recently completed for the iron-reducing species Geobacter metallireducens (accession nr. NC_007517) and the perchlorate-reducing Dechloromonas aromatica (accession nr. NC_007298), but these are not yet evaluated in formal publications. Complete genomes were also determined for bacteria capable of anaerobic degradation of halogenated hydrocarbons by halorespiration: the ~1.4 Mb genomes of Dehalococcoides ethenogenes strain 195 and Dehalococcoides sp. strain CBDB1 and the ~5.7 Mb genome of Desulfitobacterium hafniense strain Y51. Characteristic for all these bacteria is the presence of multiple paralogous genes for reductive dehalogenases, implicating a wider dehalogenating spectrum of the organisms than previously known. Moreover, genome sequences provided unprecedented insights into the evolution of reductive dehalogenation and differing strategies for niche adaptation.

Recently, it has become apparent that some organisms, including Desulfitobacterium chlororespirans, originally evaluated for halorespiration on chlorophenols, can also use certain brominated compounds, such as the herbicide bromoxynil and its major metabolite as electron acceptors for growth. Iodinated compounds may be dehalogenated as well, though the process may not satisfy the need for an electron acceptor.

== Bioavailability, chemotaxis, and transport of pollutants ==
Bioavailability, or the amount of a substance that is physiochemically accessible to microorganisms is a key factor in the efficient biodegradation of pollutants. O'Loughlin et al. (2000) showed that, with the exception of kaolinite clay, most soil clays and cation exchange resins attenuated biodegradation of 2-picoline by Arthrobacter sp. strain R1, as a result of adsorption of the substrate to the clays. Chemotaxis, or the directed movement of motile organisms towards or away from chemicals in the environment is an important physiological response that may contribute to effective catabolism of molecules in the environment. In addition, mechanisms for the intracellular accumulation of aromatic molecules via various transport mechanisms are also important.

== Oil biodegradation ==
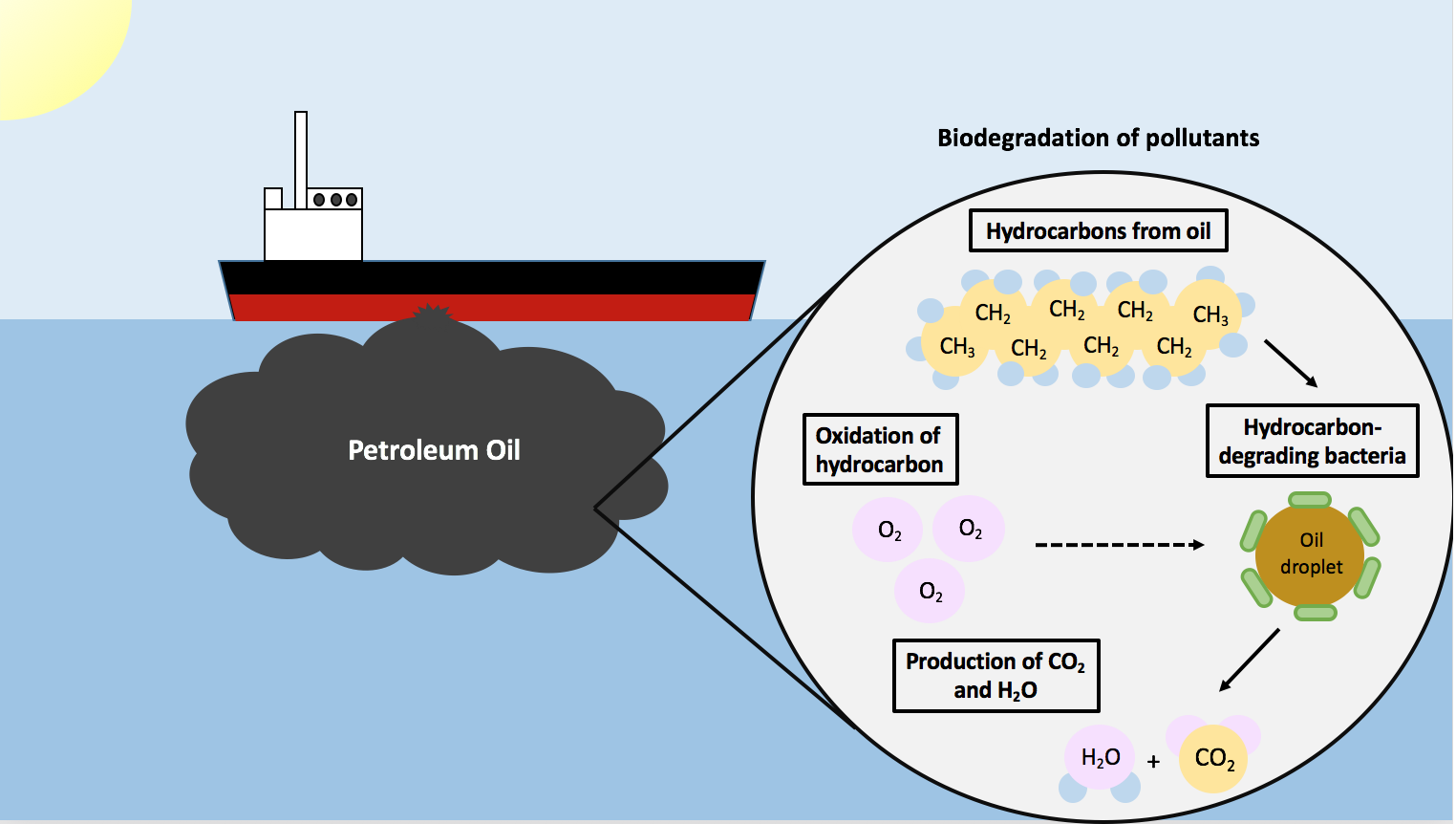
General overview of microbial biodegradation of petroleum oil by microbial communities. Some microorganisms, such as A. borkumensis, are able to use hydrocarbons as their source for carbon in metabolism. They are able to oxidize the environmentally harmful hydrocarbons while producing harmless products, following the general equation C_{n}H_{n} + O_{2} → H_{2}O + CO_{2}. In the figure, carbon is represented as yellow circles, oxygen as pink circles, and hydrogen as blue circles. This type of special metabolism allows these microbes to thrive in areas affected by oil spills and are important in the elimination of environmental pollutants.

Petroleum oil contains aromatic compounds that are toxic to most life forms. Episodic and chronic pollution of the environment by oil causes major disruption to the local ecological environment. Marine environments in particular are especially vulnerable, as oil spills near coastal regions and in the open sea are difficult to contain and make mitigation efforts more complicated. In addition to pollution through human activities, approximately 250 million litres of petroleum enter the marine environment every year from natural seepages. Despite its toxicity, a considerable fraction of petroleum oil entering marine systems is eliminated by the hydrocarbon-degrading activities of microbial communities, in particular by a recently discovered group of specialists, the hydrocarbonoclastic bacteria (HCB). Alcanivorax borkumensis was the first HCB to have its genome sequenced. In addition to hydrocarbons, crude oil often contains various heterocyclic compounds, such as pyridine, which appear to be degraded by similar mechanisms to hydrocarbons.

== Cholesterol biodegradation ==
Many synthetic steroidic compounds like some sexual hormones frequently appear in municipal and industrial wastewaters, acting as environmental pollutants with strong metabolic activities negatively affecting the ecosystems. Since these compounds are common carbon sources for many different microorganisms their aerobic and anaerobic mineralization has been extensively studied. The interest of these studies lies on the biotechnological applications of sterol transforming enzymes for the industrial synthesis of sexual hormones and corticoids. Very recently, the catabolism of cholesterol has acquired a high relevance because it is involved in the infectivity of the pathogen Mycobacterium tuberculosis (Mtb). Mtb causes tuberculosis disease, and it has been demonstrated that novel enzyme architectures have evolved to bind and modify steroid compounds like cholesterol in this organism and other steroid-utilizing bacteria as well. These new enzymes might be of interest for their potential in the chemical modification of steroid substrates.

== Analysis of waste biotreatment ==
Sustainable development requires the promotion of environmental management and a constant search for new technologies to treat vast quantities of wastes generated by increasing anthropogenic activities. Biotreatment, the processing of wastes using living organisms, is an environmentally friendly, relatively simple and cost-effective alternative to physico-chemical clean-up options. Confined environments, such as bioreactors, have been engineered to overcome the physical, chemical and biological limiting factors of biotreatment processes in highly controlled systems. The great versatility in the design of confined environments allows the treatment of a wide range of wastes under optimized conditions. To perform a correct assessment, it is necessary to consider various microorganisms having a variety of genomes and expressed transcripts and proteins. A great number of analyses are often required. Using traditional genomic techniques, such assessments are limited and time-consuming. However, several high-throughput techniques originally developed for medical studies can be applied to assess biotreatment in confined environments.

== Metabolic engineering and biocatalytic applications ==
The study of the fate of persistent organic chemicals in the environment has revealed a large reservoir of enzymatic reactions with a large potential in preparative organic synthesis, which has already been exploited for a number of oxygenases on pilot and even on industrial scale. Novel catalysts can be obtained from metagenomic libraries and DNA sequence based approaches. Increasing capabilities in adapting the catalysts to specific reactions and process requirements by rational and random mutagenesis broadens the scope for application in the fine chemical industry, but also in the field of biodegradation. In many cases, these catalysts need to be exploited in whole cell bioconversions or in fermentations, calling for system-wide approaches to understanding strain physiology and metabolism and rational approaches to the engineering of whole cells as they are increasingly put forward in the area of systems biotechnology and synthetic biology.

== Fungal biodegradation ==
In the ecosystem, different substrates are attacked at different rates by consortia of organisms from different kingdoms. Aspergillus and other moulds play an important role in these consortia because they are adept at recycling starches, hemicelluloses, celluloses, pectins and other sugar polymers. Some aspergilli are capable of degrading more refractory compounds such as fats, oils, chitin, and keratin. Maximum decomposition occurs when there is sufficient nitrogen, phosphorus and other essential inorganic nutrients. Fungi also provide food for many soil organisms.

For Aspergillus the process of degradation is the means of obtaining nutrients. When these moulds degrade human-made substrates, the process usually is called biodeterioration. Both paper and textiles (cotton, jute, and linen) are particularly vulnerable to Aspergillus degradation. Our artistic heritage is also subject to Aspergillus assault. To give but one example, after Florence in Italy flooded in 1969, 74% of the isolates from a damaged Ghirlandaio fresco in the Ognissanti church were Aspergillus versicolor.

== See also ==
- Biodegradation
- Bioremediation
- Biotransformation
- Bioavailability
- Chemotaxis
- Microbiology
- Environmental microbiology
- Industrial microbiology
