= Bioclogging =

Clogging of pore space in soil by microbial biomass

Bioclogging or biological clogging refers to the blockage of pore space in soil by microbial biomass, including active cells and their byproducts such as extracellular polymeric substance (EPS). The microbial biomass obstructs pore spaces, creating an impermeable layer in the soil and significantly reducing water infiltration rates.

Bioclogging occurs under continuous ponded infiltration at various field conditions such as artificial recharge ponds, percolation trenches, irrigation channels, sewage treatment systems, constructed wetlands, landfill liners and natural systems such as riverbeds and soils. It also affects groundwater flow in the aquifer, such as ground source heat pumps, permeable reactive barriers, and microbial enhanced oil recovery. Bioclogging is a significant problem where water infiltration is hampered and countermeasures such as regular drying of the system can reduce the levels of bioclogging. However, bioclogging can also serve beneficial purposes in specific conditions. For instance, bioclogging can be utilized to make an impermeable layer to minimize the rate of infiltration or to enhance soil mechanic properties.

== General description ==
=== Change in permeability with time ===
Bioclogging is observed as the decrease in the infiltration rate. A decrease in the infiltration rate under ponded infiltration was observed in the 1940s for studying the infiltration of artificial recharge ponds and the water-spreading on agricultural soils. Allison described that when soils are continuously submerged, permeability or saturated hydraulic conductivity changes in 3 key stages:

1. After initiating field or laboratory tests, the permeability decreases to a minimum. On highly permeable soils this initial decrease is small, or nonexistent, but for relatively impermeable soils, permeability decreases for 10 to 20 days possibly due to physical changes in the structure of the soil.
2. Permeability increases due to dissolving the entrapped air in soil into the percolating water.
3. Permeability decreases for 2 to 4 weeks due to the disintegration of aggregates and biological clogging of soil pores with microbial cells and their synthesized products, slimes, or polysaccharides.

This description is based on experiments conducted at that time, and the actual process of bioclogging depends on system conditions, such as nutrient and electron acceptor availability, microbial biofilm formation propensity, initial conditions, etc. In particular, the 3 stages are not necessarily distinct in every field condition of bioclogging; when the second stage is not clear, and permeability just continues to decrease.

=== Various types of bioclogging ===
The change in permeability with time is dependent on the field condition and there are various causes for the change in the hydraulic conductivity, including physical (suspended solids, disintegration of aggregate structure, etc), chemical (dispersion and swelling of clay particles), and biological causes (as listed below). Usually bioclogging means the first of the following, while bioclogging in a broader sense means all of the following.

1. Bioclogging by microbial cell bodies (such as bacteria, algae and fungus) and their synthesized byproducts such as extracellular polymeric substance (EPS) (also referred to as slime), which form biofilm or microcolony aggregation on soil particles are direct biological causes of the decrease in hydraulic conductivity.
2. Entrapment of gas bubbles such as methane produced by methane-producing microorganisms clog the soil pore and contributes to decreasing hydraulic conductivity. As gas is also microbial byproduct, it can also be considered to be bioclogging.
3. Iron bacteria stimulate ferric oxyhydroxide deposition which may cause clogging of soil pores. This is an indirect biological cause of the decrease in hydraulic conductivity.

Bioclogging is mostly observed in saturated conditions, but bioclogging in unsaturated conditions is also studied.

== Field observation ==
=== Field problem and countermeasures ===
Bioclogging is a significant issue in various environmental and artificial water systems. Here are some specific field problems related to bioclogging and their potential countermeasures.

1. Bioclogging commonly occurs during continuous ponded infiltration in such places as artificial recharge ponds and percolation trenches. Reduction of infiltration rate due to bioclogging at the infiltrating surface reduces the efficiency of such systems. To minimize the bioclogging effects, pretreatment of the water to reduce suspended solids, nutrients, and organic carbon might be necessary. Regular drying and physical removal of the clogging layer can be an effective countermeasure.
2. Similarly, septic drain fields are prone to bioclogging primarily due to the continuous flow of nutrient-rich wastewater. The organic material causing bioclogging in the septic tank is sometimes called biomat. Pretreatment of water by filtration or reducing the load of the system could delay the failure of the system by bioclogging. Slow sand filter system also suffers from bioclogging. Besides the countermeasures mentioned above, cleaning or backwashing sand may be operated to remove biofilm and recover the permeability of sand.
3. In river systems, bioclogging can significantly impact aquifer recharge, particularly in dry regions where losing rivers are prevalent. As a result of bioclogging, the connection between surface water and groundwater in riverine systems is affected. The development of a biofilm-induced clogging layer can lead to disconnection, changing the natural water flow patterns between rivers and aquifers.
4. Bioclogging is also a concern in aquifers, particularly when water is extracted through water wells below the groundwater table. Over months and years of continued operation of water wells, they may show a gradual reduction in performance due to bioclogging or other clogging mechanisms. Bioclogging may also affect the sustainable operation of ground source heat pumps. Common approaches to treating bioclogging include utilizing phosphate, a critical nutrient for iron-bacteria biofilms, and employing chlorine and fungicides to address bacterial issues. Backwashing is a common method to deal with clogging in general, including bioclogging.

=== Benefits ===
In certain environments, bioclogging positively influences hydrological process. Here are some examples.

1. Bioclogging plays a crucial role in sealing the bottoms of stabilization ponds for dairy farm wastewater treatment. Similarly, irrigation channels for seepage control may be inoculated with algae and bacteria to promote bioclogging for reducing water loss.
2. Turning to landfill liners, such as compacted clay liners, bioclogging emerges as a beneficial factor. Clay liners are usually used in landfill to minimize pollution from landfill leachate to the surrounding soil environment. The hydraulic conductivity of clay liners becomes lower than the original value due to bioclogging, which is caused by microorganism in the leachate and the pore spaces in the clay.
3. Bioclogging is a common occurrence in constructed wetlands which are engineered for treating various contaminated waters. Notably, in wetlands with subsurface horizontal flow, preferential flow paths avoiding the clogged part can improve the system treatment efficiency.
4. Biofilm formation plays a crucial role in bioremediation, particularly in treating biodegradable groundwater pollution. A permeable reactive barrier is formed to contain the groundwater flow by bioclogging and also to degrade pollution by microbes. Contaminant flow should be carefully analyzed because a preferential flow path in the barrier may reduce the efficiency of the remediation.
5. In the extraction of petroleum, enhanced oil recovery techniques are applied to maximize oil extraction from oil fields. The injected water displaces the oil in the reservoir which is transported to recovery wells. As the reservoir is not uniform in permeability, injected water tends to go through a high permeable zone and does not go through the zone where oil remains. In this situation, the bacterial profile modification technique, which injects bacteria into the high permeable zone to promote bioclogging can be employed. It is a type of microbial enhanced oil recovery.
6. The potential of bioclogging in geotechnical engineering is under exploration, particularly for improving soil mechanical properties. This involves strategies like reducing porosity and hydraulic conductivity, and enhancing shear strength through biocementation, thereby optimizing the soil for construction and environmental applications.

== See also ==
- Biofilm
- Hydraulic conductivity
- Landfill liner
- Microbial enhanced oil recovery
- Septic tank
- Slow sand filter
