= Microbial enhanced oil recovery =

Oil extraction technology

Microbial Enhanced Oil Recovery (MEOR) is a biological-based technology involving the manipulation of functions or structures within microbial environments present in oil reservoirs. The primary objective of MEOR is to improve the extraction of oil confined within porous media, while boosting economic benefits. As a tertiary oil extraction technology, MEOR enables the partial recovery of the commonly residual 2/3 of oil, effectively prolonging the operational lifespan of mature oil reservoirs.

MEOR is a multidisciplinary field incorporating, among others: geology, chemistry, microbiology, fluid mechanics, petroleum engineering, environmental engineering and chemical engineering. The microbial processes proceeding in MEOR can be classified according to the oil production problem in the field:

- wellbore clean up removes mud and other debris blocking the channels where oil flows through;
- well stimulation improves the flow of oil from the drainage area into the well bore; and
- enhanced water floods through stimulating microbial activity by injecting selected nutrients and sometimes indigenous microbes. From the engineering point of view, MEOR is a system integrated by the reservoir, microbes, nutrients and protocol of well injection.
- Enhance oil recovery of the depleting multistage fractured horizontal shale oil wells in unconventional shale oil reservoir.

== Outcomes ==
So far, the outcomes of MEOR are explained based on two predominant rationales:

Increment in oil production. This is done by modifying the interfacial properties of the system oil-water-minerals, with the aim of facilitating oil movement through porous media. In such a system, microbial activity affects fluidity (viscosity reduction, miscible flooding); displacement efficiency (decrease of interfacial tension, increase of permeability); sweep efficiency (mobility control, selective plugging) and driving force (reservoir pressure).

Reduce water cut. The indigenous microbes stimulated by the injected microbial nutrients grow fast and selectively block the "thief zones", divert the injected water to sweep the unswept oil.

The aforementioned two rationals are demonstrated in a Youtube video prepared by New Aero Technology LLC.

== Relevance ==
Several decades of research and successful applications support the claims of MEOR as a mature technology. Despite those facts, disagreement still exists. Successful stories are specific for each MEOR field application, and published information regarding supportive economical advantages is however nonexistent. Despite this, there is consensus considering MEOR one of the cheapest existing EOR methods. However, obscurity exists on predicting whether or not the deployment of MEOR will be successful. MEOR is, therefore, one of the future research areas with great priority as identified by the "Oil and Gas in the 21st Century Task Force". This is probably because MEOR is a complementary technology that may help recover the 377 billion barrels of oil that are unrecoverable by conventional technologies.

== Bias ==
Before the advent of environmental molecular microbiology, the word "bacteria" was utilised indistinctively in many fields to refer to uncharacterized microbes, and such systematic error affected several disciplines. Therefore, the word "microbe" or "microorganism" will therefore be preferred hereafter in the text.

In Microbial EOR, only the beneficial microbes are stimulated, like Nitrate Reducing Bacteria (NRB). The non-beneficial bacteria like Sulphate Reducing Bacteria (SRB) are not stimulated because the MEOR process only introduces nitrate to the reservoir, but not introduces sulphate to it. In the meantime, the growing NRB can control the activities of SRB, reduce the concentration of H_{2}S. To some extent, MEOR process may recover the reservoir from sour to sweet.

== History ==
It was in 1926 when Beckam proposed the utilisation of microorganisms as agents for recovering the remnant oil entrapped in porous media. Since that time numerous investigations have been developed, and are extensively reviewed. In 1947, ZoBell and colleagues set the basis of petroleum microbiology applied to oil recovery, whose contribution would be useful for the first MEOR patent granted to Updegraff and colleagues in 1957 concerning the in situ production of oil recovery agents such as gases, acids, solvents and biosurfactants from microbial degradation of molasses. In 1954, the first field test was carried out in the Lisbon field in Arkansas, USA. During that time, Kuznetsov discovered the microbial gas production from oil. From this year and until the 1970s there was intensive research in USA, USSR, Czechoslovakia, Hungary and Poland. The main type of field experiments developed in those countries consisted in injecting exogenous microbes. In 1958, selective plugging with microbial produced biomass was proposed by Heinningen and colleagues. The oil crisis of 1970 triggered a great interest in active MEOR research in more than 15 countries. From 1970 to 2000, basic MEOR research focused on microbial ecology and characterization of oil reservoirs. In 1983, Ivanov and colleagues developed the strata microbial activation technology. By 1990, MEOR achieved an interdisciplinary technology status. In 1995, a survey of MEOR projects (322) in the USA showed that 81% of the projects successfully increased oil production, and there was not a single case of reduced oil production. Today, MEOR is gaining attention owing to its low cost (less than $10 per incremental bbl) and low CAPEX requirement (the operator does not need to invest in surface facilities as traditional chemical or CO_{2} EOR, and can reduce the number of infill drilling wells). Several countries indicated they might be willing to use MEOR in one third of their oil recovery programs by 2010. In addition, as the Wall Street, shale oil operators, and the US DOE realize the extreme recovery factor of the US shale oil wells (lower than 10%), the US SBIR sponsored the first MEOR pilot of multistage fractured shale oil well in the world in 2018, "Field pilot test of Novel Biological EOR Process for Extracting Trapped Oil from Unconventional Reservoirs", conducted by New Aero Technology LLC.

== Advantages ==
There is a plethora of reviewed claims regarding the advantages of MEOR. There are lots of publications in the website www.onepetro.com maintained by the Society of Petroleum Engineering and other websites or databases. Some field applications are also shared by petroleum microbiology companies.

Advantages can be summarised as follows:

- Injected microbes and nutrients are cheap; (the injection of microbes is out of date. The new microbial EOR technology does not need to inject microbes to the reservoir, but only inject nutrients to stimulate the indigenous microbes)
- easy to handle in the field and independent of oil prices.
- Economically attractive for mature oil fields before abandonment.
- Increases oil production.
- Existing facilities require slight modifications.
- Easy application.
- Less expensive set up.
- Low energy input requirement for microbes to produce MEOR agents.
- More efficient than other EOR methods when applied to carbonate oil reservoirs.
- Microbial activity increases with microbial growth. This is opposite to the case of other EOR additives in time and distance.
- Microbial nutrients are biodegradable and therefore can be considered environmentally friendly.

== Disadvantages ==
Disadvantages of MEOR:

- Microbial growth is favoured when: layer permeability is greater than 20 md; reservoir temperature is inferior to 85 ^{0}C, salinity is below 100,000 ppm and reservoir depth is less than 3,500m.
- The recent cases proved that there is no corrosion during MEOR based on continuous field monitoring results. In addition, the stimulated indigenous microbes do not affect crude oil qualities, and there is no sign of increasing microbes in the produced liquid.

== Environment of an oil reservoir ==
Oil reservoirs are complex environments containing living (microorganisms) and non living factors (minerals) which interact with each other in a complicated dynamic network of nutrients and energy fluxes. Since the reservoir is heterogeneous, so do the variety of ecosystems containing diverse microbial communities, which in turn are able to affect reservoir behaviour and oil mobilization.

Microbes are living machines whose metabolites, excretion products and new cells may interact with each other or with the environment, positively or negatively, depending on the global desirable purpose, e.g. the enhancement of oil recovery. All these entities, i.e. enzymes, extracellular polymeric substances (EPS) and the cells themselves, may participate as catalyst or reactants. Such complexity is increased by the interplay with the environment, the later playing a crucial role by affecting cellular function, i.e. genetic expression and protein production.

Despite this fundamental knowledge on cell physiology, a solid understanding on function and structure of microbial communities in oil reservoirs, i.e. ecophysiology, remains inexistent.

The aim of MEOR is to enhancing oil recovery continuously by making use of the metabolic process of the indigenous beneficial microbes.

== Environmental constraints ==
Several factors concomitantly affect microbial growth and activity. In oil reservoirs, such environmental constraints permit the establishment of criteria to assess and compare the suitability of various microorganisms. Those constraints may not be as harsh as other environments on Earth. For example, with connate brines the salinity is higher than that of sea water but lower than that of salt lakes. In addition, pressures up to 20 MPa and temperatures up to 85 °C, in oil reservoirs, are within the limits for the survival of other microorganisms.

Some environmental constraints creating selective pressures on cellular systems that may also affect microbial communities in oil reservoirs are:

=== Temperature ===
Enzymes are biological catalysts whose function is affected by a variety of factors including temperature, which, at different ranges, may improve or hamper enzymatic mediated reactions. This will have an effect over the optimal cellular growth or metabolism. Such dependency permits classification of microbes according to the range of temperatures at which they grow. For instance: psychrophiles (<25 °C), mesophiles (25–45 °C), thermophiles (45–60 °C) and hyperthermophiles (60–121 °C). Although such cells optimally grow in these temperature ranges there may not be a direct relationship with the production of specific metabolites.

=== Pressure ===
==== Direct effects ====
The effects of pressure on microbial growth under deep ocean conditions were investigated by ZoBell and Johnson in 1949. They called those microbes whose growth was enhanced by increasing pressure, barophilic. Other classifications of microorganisms are based on whether microbial growth is inhibited at standard conditions (piezophiles) or above 40 MPa (piezotolerants). From a molecular point of view, the review of Daniel shows that at high pressures the DNA double helix becomes denser, and therefore both gene expression and protein synthesis are affected.

==== Indirect effect ====
Increasing pressure increases gas solubility, and this may affect the redox potential of gases participating as electron acceptors and donors, such as hydrogen or CO_{2}.

=== Pore size/geometry ===
One study has concluded that substantial bacterial activity is achieved when there are interconnections of pores having at least 0.2 μm diameter. It is expected that pore size and geometry may affect chemotaxis. However, this has not been proven at oil reservoir conditions.

=== pH ===
The acidity of alkalinity has an impact over several aspects in living and non living systems. For instance:

==== Surface charge ====
Changes in cellular surface and membrane thickness may be promoted by pH due to its ionization power of cellular membrane embedded proteins. The modified ionic regions may interact with mineral particles and affect the motion of cells through the porous media.

==== Enzymatic activity ====
Embedded cell proteins play a fundamental role in the transport of chemicals across the cellular membrane. Their function is strongly dependent on their state of ionisation, which is in turn strongly affected by pH.

In both cases, this may happen in isolated or complex environmental microbial communities. So far the understanding on the interaction between pH and environmental microbial communities remains unknown, despite the efforts of the last decade. Little is known of the ecophysiology of complex microbial communities, and research is still in developmental stage.

=== Oxidation potential ===
The oxidation potential (Eh, measured in volts) is, as in any reaction system, the thermodynamic driving force of anaerobic respiration, which takes place in oxygen depleted environments. Prokaryotes are among the cells that have anaerobic respiration as metabolic strategy for survival. The electron transport takes place along and across the cellular membrane (prokaryotes lack of mitochondria). Electrons are transferred from an electron donor (molecule to be oxidised anaerobically) to an electron acceptor (NO_{3}, SO_{4}, MnO_{4}, etc.). The net Eh between a given electron donor and acceptor; hydrogen ions and other species in place will determine which reaction will first take place. For instance, nitrification is hierarchically more favoured than sulphate reduction. This allows for enhanced oil recovery by disfavouring biologically produced H_{2}S, which derives from reduced SO_{4}. In this process, the effects of nitrate reduction on wettability, interfacial tension, viscosity, permeability, biomass and biopolymer production remain unknown.

=== Electrolyte composition ===
Electrolytes concentration and other dissolved species may affect cellular physiology. Dissolving electrolytes reduces thermodynamic activity (aw), vapour pressure and autoprotolysis of water. Besides, electrolytes promote an ionic strength gradient across cellular membrane and therefore provides a powerful driving force allowing the diffusion of water into or out to cells. In natural environments, most bacteria are incapable of living at aw below 0.95. However, some microbes from hypersaline environment such as Pseudomonas species and Halococcus thrive at lower a_{w}, and are therefore interesting for MEOR research.

=== Non-specific effects ===
They may occur on pH and Eh. For example, increasing ionic strength increases solubility of nonelectrolytes ('salting out') as in the case of dissolution of carbon dioxide, a pH controller of a variety of natural waters.

=== Biological factors ===
Although it is widely accepted that predation, parasitism, syntrophism and other relationships also occur in the microbial world, little is known in this relationships on MEOR and they have been disregarded in MEOR experiments.

In other cases, some microorganisms can thrive in nutrient deficient environments (oligotrophy) such as deep granitic and basaltic aquifers. Other microbes, living in sediments, may utilise available organic compounds (heterotrophy). Organic matter and metabolic products between geological formations can diffuse and support microbial growth in distant environments.

== Mechanism ==
Understanding MEOR mechanism is still far from being clear. Although a variety of explanations has been given in isolated experiments, it is unclear if they were carried out trying to mimic oil reservoirs conditions.

The mechanism can be explained from the client-operator viewpoint which considers a series of concomitant positive or negative effects that will result in a global benefit:

- Beneficial effects. Biodegradation of big molecules reduces viscosity; production of surfactants reduces interfacial tension; production of gas provides additional pressure driving force; microbial metabolites or the microbes themselves may reduce permeability by activation of secondary flow paths. The growing nitrate reducing bacteria will compete food with the sulphate reducing bacteria, and generate nitrite to kill the sulphate reducing bacteria, therefore conquer the activities of sulphate reducing bacteria, reduce H_{2}S concentration, mitigate downhole corrosion caused by sulphate reducing bacteria, acid producing bacteria, etc.
- Sweep the unswept oil. Permeability reduction can be beneficial due to bioclogging if the MEOR is designed and implemented properly. If it is not designed and deployed properly, microbial metabolites or the microbes themselves may reduce permeability by activation of secondary flow paths by depositing: biomass (biological clogging), minerals (chemical clogging) or other suspended particles (physical clogging). Positively, attachment of bacteria and development of slime, i.e. extracellular polymeric substances (EPS), favour the plugging of highly permeable zones (thieves zones) leading to increased sweep efficiency.

== Strategies ==
Changing oil reservoir ecophysiology to favour MEOR can be achieved by complementing different strategies. In situ microbial stimulation can be chemically promoted by injecting electron acceptors such as nitrate; easy fermentable molasses, vitamins or surfactants. Alternatively, MEOR is promoted by injecting exogenous microbes, which may be adapted to oil reservoir conditions and be capable of producing desired MEOR agents (Table 1).

Table 1. Possible applications of products and MEOR agents produced by microorganism.
MEOR agents	Microbes	Product	Possible MEOR application
Biomass, i.e. flocks or biofilms	Bacillus sp.	Cells and EPS (mainly exopolysaccharides)	Selective plugging of oil depleted zones and wettability angle alteration
	Leuconostoc		
	Xanthomonas		
Surfactants	Acinetobacter	Emulsan and alasan	Emulsification and de-emulsification through reduction of interfacial tension
	Bacillus sp.	Surfactin, rhamnolipid, lichenysin	
	Pseudomonas	Rhamnolipid, glycolipids	
	Rhodococcus sp.	Viscosin and trehaloselipids	
	Arthrobacter		
Biopolymers	Xanthomonas sp.	Xanthan gum	Injectivity profile and viscosity modification, selective plugging
	Aureobasidium sp.	Pullulan	
	Bacillus sp.	Levan	
	Alcaligenes sp.	Curdlan	
	Leuconostoc sp.	Dextran	
	Sclerotium sp.	Scleroglucan	
	Brevibacterium		
Solvents	Clostridium, Zymomonas and Klebsiella	Acetone, butanol, propan-2-diol	Rock dissolution for increasing permeability, oil viscosity reduction
Acids	Clostridium	Propionic and butyric acids	Permeability increase, emulsification
	Enterobacter		
	Mixed acidogens		
Gases	Clostridium	Methane and hydrogen	Increased pressure, oil swelling, reduction of interfacial section and viscosity; increase permeability
	Enterobacter		
	Methanobacterium		

This knowledge has been obtained from experiments with pure cultures and some times with complex microbial communities but the experimental conditions are far from mimicking those ones prevailing in oil reservoirs. It is unknown if metabolic products is cell growth dependent, and claims in this respect should be taken cautiously, since the production of a metabolite is not always dependent of cellular growth.

=== Biomass and biopolymers ===
In selective plugging, conditioned cells and extracellular polymeric substances plug high permeability zones, resulting in a change of direction of the water flood to oil-rich channels, consequently increasing the sweep efficiency of oil recovery with water flooding. Biopolymer production and the resulting biofilm formation (less 27% cells, 73–98% EPS and void space) are affected by water chemistry, pH, surface charge, microbial physiology, nutrients and fluid flow.

=== Biosurfactants ===
Microbial produced surfactants, i.e. biosurfactants reduce the interfacial tension between water and oil, and therefore a lower hydrostatic pressure is required to move the liquid entrapped in the pores to overcome the capillary effect. Secondly, biosurfactants contribute to the formation of micelles providing a physical mechanism to mobilise oil in a moving aqueous phase. Hydrophobic and hydrophilic compounds are in play and have attracted attention in MEOR research, and the main structural types are lipopeptides and glycolipids, being the fatty acid molecule the hydrophobic part. Biosurfactant produced by Pseudomonas putida exhibited higher interfacial tension (51 – 8 mN/m) between oil and water, which is necessary to mobilize oil easily

=== Gas and solvents ===
In this old practice, the production of gas has a positive effect in oil recovery by increasing the differential pressure driving the oil movement. Anaerobically produced methane from oil degradation have a low effect on MEOR due to its high solubility at high pressures. Carbon dioxide is also a good MEOR agent. The miscible CO_{2} is condensed into the liquid phase when light hydrocarbons are vaporised into the gas phase. Immiscible CO_{2} helps to saturate oil, resulting in swelling and reduction of viscosity of the liquid phase and consequently improving mobilization by extra driving pressure. Concomitantly, other gases and solvents may dissolve carbonate rock, leading to an increase in rock permeability and porosity.

== Field studies ==
Worldwide MEOR field applications have been reviewed in detail. Although the exact number field trials is unknown, Lazar et al. suggested an order of hundreds. Successful MEOR field trials have been conducted in the U.S., Russia, China, Australia, Argentina, Bulgaria, former Czechoslovakia, former East Germany, Hungary, India, Malaysia, Peru, Poland, and Romania. Lazar et al. suggested China is leading in the area, and also found that the most successful study was carried out in Alton field, Australia (40% increase of oil production in 12 months).

The majority of the field trials were done in sandstone reservoirs and very few in fractured reservoirs and carbonates. The only known offshore field trials were in Norne (Norway) and Bokor (Malaysia).

As reviewed by Lazar et al., field application followed different approaches such as injection of exogenous microorganisms (microbial flooding); control of paraffin deposition; stimulation of indigenous microbes; injection of ex situ produced biopolymers; starved selected ultramicrobes (selected plugging); selected plugging by sand consolidation due to biomineralization and fracture clogging in carbonate formations; nutrient manipulation of indigenous reservoir microbes to produce ultramicrobes; and adapted mixed enrichment cultures.

Reported MEOR results from field trials vary widely. Rigorous controlled experiments are lacking and may not be possible due to the dynamic changes in the reservoir when oil is being recovered. Besides, the economical advantages of these field trials are unknown, and the answer to why the other trials were unsuccessful is unknown. General conclusions can not be drawn because the physical and mineralogical characteristics of the oil reservoirs reported were different. The extrapolation of such conclusions is therefore unviable.

Most of the successful field cases were conducted by Glori Energy Inc. in Houston. It has successful stories in Kansas, California, Canada, Brazil, etc. The field applications can be found from the website of the new owner of Glori's intellectual properties.

== Models ==
A plethora of attempts to model MEOR has been published. Until now, it is unclear if theoretical results reflect the scarce published data. Developing mathematical models for MEOR is very challenging since physical, chemical and biological factors need to be considered.

Published MEOR models are composed of transport properties, conservation laws, local equilibrium, breakdown of filtration theory and physical straining. Such models are so far simplistic and they were developed based on:

(A) Fundamental conservation laws, cellular growth, retention kinetics of biomass, and biomass in oil and aqueous phases. The main aim was to predict porosity retention as a function of distance and time.

(B) Filtration model to express bacterial transport as a function of pore size; and relate permeability with the rate of microbial penetration by applying Darcy's law.

Chemical kinetics is fundamental for coupling bioproduct formation to fluxes of aqueous species and suspended microbes. Fully numerical approaches have also been followed. For instance, coupled nonlinear parabolic differential equations: adding equation for the rate of diffusion of microbes and their capture by porous medium; differential balance equations for nutrient transport, including the effect of adsorption; and the assumption of bacterial growth kinetic based on Monod equation.

Monod equation is commonly used in modelling software but it has a limited behaviour for being inconsistent with the law of mass action that form the basis of kinetic characterization of microbial growth. Application of law of mass action to microbial populations results in the linear logistic equation. If the law of mass action is applied to an enzyme-catalysed process it results in the Michaelis–Menten equation, from which Monod is inspired. This makes things difficult for in situ biosurfactant production because controlled experimentation is required to determine specific growth rate and Michaelis–Menten parameters of rate-limiting enzyme reaction.

Modelling of bioclogging is complicated because the production of clogging metabolite is coupled nonlinearly to the growth of microbes and flux of nutrients transported in the fluid.

The ecophysiology of the entire microbial microcosms at oil reservoir conditions is still unclear and thus not considered by the available models. Microorganisms are a kind of catalyst whose activity (physiology) depends on the mutual interplay with other microbes and the environment (ecology). In nature, living and non living elements interact with each other in a complicated network of nutrients and energy. Some microbes produce extracellular polymeric substances and therefore its behaviour in pours media needs to consider both occupation by the EPS and the microbes themselves. Knowledge is lacking in this respect and therefore the aim of maximizing yield and minimizing cost remains unachieved.

Realistic models for MEOR at the conditions of the oil reservoir are missing, and reported parallel-pore models had fundamental deficiencies that were overcome by models considering the clogging of pores by microbes or biofilms, but such models have also the deficiency of being two-dimensional. The utilisation of such models in three dimensional models has not been proven. It is uncertain if they can be incorporated to popular oilfield simulation software. Thus, a field strategy needs a simulator capable of predicting bacterial growth and transport through porous network and in situ production of MEOR agents.

== Grounds of failure ==
- Lack of holistic approach allowing for a critical evaluation of economics, applicability and performance of MEOR is missing.
- No published study includes reservoir characteristics; biochemical and physiological characteristics of microbiota; controlling mechanisms and process economics.
- The ecophysiology of microbial communities thriving in oil reservoirs is largely unexplored. Consequently, there is a poor critical evaluation of the physical and biochemical mechanisms controlling microbial response to the hydrocarbon substrates and their mobility.
- Absence of quantitative understanding of microbial activity and poor understanding of the synergistic interactions between living and none living elements. Experiments based on pure cultures or enrichments are questionable because microbial communities interact synergistically with minerals, extracellular polymeric substances and other physicochemical and biological factors in the environment.
- Lack of cooperation between microbiologists, reservoir engineers, geologists, economists and owner operators; incomplete pertinent reservoir data, in published sources: lithology, depth, net thickness, porosity, permeability, temperature, pressure, reserves, reservoir fluid properties (oil gravity, water salinity, oil viscosity, bubble point pressure, and oil-formation-volume factor), specific EOR data (number of production and injection wells, incremental recovery potential as mentioned by the operator, injection rate, calculated daily and total enhanced production), calculated incremental recovery potential over the reported time.
- Limited understanding of MEOR process economics and improper assessment of technical, logistical, cost, and oil recovery potential.
- Unknowns life cycle assessments. Unknown environmental impact
- Lack of demonstrable quantitative relationships between microbial performance, reservoir characteristics and operating conditions
- Inconsistency with in situ performance; low ultimate oil recovery factor; uncertainty about meeting engineering design criteria by microbial process; and a general apprehension about process involving live bacteria.
- Lack of rigorous controlled experiments, which are far from mimicking oil reservoir conditions that may have an effect over gene expression and protein formation.
- Kinetic characterization of bacteria of interest is unknown. Monod equation has been broadly misused.
- Lack of structured mathematical models to better describe MEOR.
- Lack of understanding of microbial oil recovery mechanism and deficient mathematical models to predict microbial behaviour in different reservoirs.
- Surfactants: biodegradable, effectiveness affected by temperature, pH and salt concentration; adsorption on to rock surfaces.
- Unfeasible economic solutions such as the utilization of enzymes and cultured microorganism.
- Difficult isolation or engineering of good candidate strains able to survive the extreme environment of oil reservoirs (up to 85 °C, up to 17.23 MPa).

== Trends ==
- Remediate the formation damage caused by the chemical fracturing fluid additives in unconventional shale oil and gas reservoirs.
- Plug the high permeable zones near the injector and optimize the injection profile.
- Dispersion of components necessary to the target.
- Mitigation of unwanted secondary activity due to competitive redox processes such as sulphate reduction, i.e. control of souring, control of microbiologically induced corrosion.
- Microbial paraffin removal.
- Microbial skin damage removal.
- Water floods, where continuous water phase enables the introduction of MEOR.
- Single-well stimulation, here the low cost makes MEOR the best choice.
- Selective plugging strategies.
- Genetically engineered MEOR microorganisms able to survive, grow and produce metabolites at the expense of cheap nutrients and substrates.
- Application of extremophiles: halophiles, barophiles, and thermophiles.
- Artificial neural network modelling for describing in situ MEOR processes.
- Competition of exogenous microbes with indigenous micro flora, no understanding of microbial activity.
