= Alcanivorax borkumensis =

Scientific classification
- Domain: Bacteria
- Kingdom: Pseudomonadati
- Phylum: Pseudomonadota
- Class: Gammaproteobacteria
- Order: Oceanospirillales
- Family: Alcanivoracaceae
- Genus: Alcanivorax
- Species: A. borkumensis

Binomial name
- Alcanivorax borkumensis Yakimov et al. 1998

Type strain
- ATCC 700651 CIP 105606; DSM 11573; SK2

Species of bacteria

Alcanivorax borkumensis is an alkane-degrading marine bacterium which naturally propagates and becomes predominant in crude-oil-containing seawater when nitrogen and phosphorus nutrients are supplemented.

== Description ==
A. borkumensis is a rod-shaped bacterium without flagella that obtains its energy primarily from consuming alkanes (a type of hydrocarbon). It is aerobic, meaning it uses oxygen to gain energy, and it is halophilic, meaning it tends to live in environments that contain salt, such as salty ocean water. It is also Gram-negative, which essentially means it has a relatively thin cell wall. It is also nonmotile; however, other organisms that appear to be in the same genus are motile through flagella.

== Discovery ==
The microorganism was discovered near the island of Borkum (hence the epithet borkumensis) by the Helmholtz Centre for Infection Research and the Technical University of Braunschweig and in 2006, them and Bielefeld University identified the Base sequence of the genome of the bacterium.

== Genome ==
The genome of A. borkumensis is a single circular chromosome that contains 3,120,143 base pairs. It is highly adapted to degrading petroleum oil. For example, a certain sequence on the genome codes for the degradation of a certain range of alkanes. The A. borkumensis genome has many sequences that each code for a different type of alkane, allowing it to be highly adaptable and versatile. Its genome also contains instructions for the formation of biosurfactants which aid in the process of degradation. To deal with external threats, the A. borkumensis genome also codes for several defensive mechanisms. Coping with high concentrations of sodium ions (i.e. in ocean water), and protecting against the UV radiation experienced on the surface of the earth are both important for the A. borkumensis bacteria, and its genome contains ways to solve both of these problems.

== Ecology ==
A. borkumensis is found naturally in seawater environments. It is more common in oceanic areas containing petroleum oil (whether from spills, natural fields, or other sources), although it can be found in small amounts in unpolluted water. It has been found across the world in various locations both in coastal environments and oceanic environments. It also can flourish in areas with heavy tides and other sea related currents/flow. It is found only on or near the surface of water. A. borkumensis can live in salinities ranging from 1.0-12.5% and in temperatures ranging from 4-35 °C. The abundance of A. borkumensis in oil-affected environments is because the bacteria use the compounds in oil as a source of energy, thus populations of A. borkumensis naturally flourish at oil spills or other similar locations. A. borkumensis outcompetes other species of the Alcanivorax genus, likely due to its highly flexible DNA and metabolism. A. borkumensis also outcompetes other alkane-degrading organisms such as Acinetobacter venetianus. After a certain period of time, an oily and saline environment containing A. borkumensis and Acinetobacter venetianus would eventually become dominated by A. borkumensis because A. borkumensis can consume a wider variety of alkanes than other known species.

== Metabolism ==
A. borkumensis primarily uses alkanes as its source of energy/carbon, but it can use a few other organic compounds. Unlike most other cells, it cannot consume more common substances such as sugars or amino acids as a source of energy. This is due to the lack of genes that code for active or passive carbohydrate transporters, hence the inability to consume monomeric sugars.

In a A. borkumensis, a number of different enzymes are tasked with oxidizing alkane molecules. The aerobic metabolism of alkanes is carried out through the terminal alkane oxidation pathway, where monooxygenases initiate the oxidation of terminal carbons. This sequential pathway first produces alcohols, then alcohol and aldehyde dehydrogenases, and ultimately aldehydes and fatty acids, respectively.

Following an oil spill, huge imbalances in the carbon/nitrogen and carbon/phosphorus ratios can be observed. For this, A. borkumensis have a myriad of transport proteins that allow fast uptake of key nutrients that are limiting in the environment. To increase the growth rate of a population of A. borkumensis bacteria, phosphorus and nitrogenous compounds can be added to the environment. These substances act as a fertilizer for the bacteria and help them grow at an increased rate.

== A. borkumensis and biosurfactants ==
When A. borkumensis bacteria use alkanes or pyruvate as their source of energy, each cell forms a biosurfactant. A biosurfactant is an extra layer of material that forms along the cell membrane. The substances that make up the biosurfactant of A. borkumensis can reduce the surface tension of water, which helps with the degradation of oil. The main compound is a glycine glucolipid, which is formed by the activity of a nonribosomal peptide synthetase that catalyzes the synthesis of the aglycone (tetra-D-3-hydroxydecanoyl-glycine), and a glycosyltransferase adding a glucose moiety. They are also emulsifiers, which further serve to create the oil/water emulsion, making oil more soluble. A. borkumensis forms a biofilm around an oil droplet in seawater and proceeds to use biosurfactants and metabolism to degrade the oil into a water-soluble substance.

== Biotechnological applications ==
=== Role in oil biodegradation ===
Petroleum oil is toxic for most life forms and pollution of the environment by oil causes major ecological problems. A considerable amount of petroleum oil entering the sea is eliminated by the microbial biodegradation activities of microbial communities. As a recently discovered hydrocarbonoclastic, A. borkumensis is capable of degrading oil in seawater environments. Hydrocarbonoclastic has the root 'clastic' meaning it can divide something into parts (in this case hydrocarbons). Crude oil, or petroleum, is predominantly made up of hydrocarbons, a product that consists of a long chain of carbon atoms attached to hydrogen atoms. Whereas most organisms use sugars or amino acids for their source of carbon/energy, A. borkumensis uses alkanes, a type of hydrocarbon, in its metabolic process. This diet allows A. borkumensis to flourish in marine environments that have been affected by oil spills. Through its metabolism, A. borkumensis can break down oil into harmless compounds. This ability makes this particular species a major potential source for bioremediation of oil-polluted marine environments.

=== Potential as anti-oil spill agent ===
Oil spills can occur during transportation of oil or during extraction. Such spills may dump significant quantities of oil into the ocean and pollute the environment, affecting ecosystems near and far.

Normally, many years are needed for an ecosystem to recover fully (if at all) from an oil spill, so scientists have been looking into ways to expedite the cleanup of areas affected by an oil spill. Most efforts so far use direct human involvement/labor to physically remove the oil from the environment. However, A. borkumensis presents a possible alternative. Since A. borkumensis naturally breaks down oil molecules to a nonpolluting state, it would help ecosystems to quickly recover from an oil spill disaster. The organisms also naturally grow in oil-contaminated seawater, thus are a native species. If the process A. borkumensis uses to break down oil could be sped up or made more efficient, this would aid recovering ecosystems. Some examples include encouraging the growth of A. borkumensis (through phosphorus and nitrogen fertilization) so more of them are breaking down oil, or encouraging the metabolism of A. borkumensis so they metabolize faster and more.

=== Potential in biopolymer production ===
By disrupting an acyl-coenzyme A (CoA) thioesterase gene, Sabirova and colleagues were able to mutate the organism to hyper-produce polyhydroxyalkanoates (PHA). They were then able to recover the large amounts of PHA that were released by mutant Alcanivorax from the culture mediums with relative ease. Before, costly and environmentally dangerous solvents had to be used in order to retrieve PHA from intracellular granules. This allows for production of environmentally friendly polymers in factories that utilized mutant Alcanivorax.
