= Alkane 1-monooxygenase =

Enzyme

alkane 1-monooxygenase

Identifiers
- EC no.: 1.14.15.3
- CAS no.: 9059-16-9

Databases
- BRENDA: enzyme data
- ExPASy: NiceZyme view
- KEGG: enzyme entry
- MetaCyc: metabolic pathway
- Rhea: reactions
- PDB structures: RCSB PDB PDBe PDBsum
- Gene Ontology: AmiGO / QuickGO
Search
- PMC: articles
- PubMed: articles
- NCBI: proteins

In enzymology, an alkane 1-monooxygenase (EC 1.14.15.3) is an enzyme that catalyzes the chemical reactions

an alkane + reduced rubredoxin + O_{2} $\rightleftharpoons$ a primary alcohol + oxidized rubredoxin + H_{2}O.

Alkanes of 6 to 22 carbons have been observed as substrates. This enzyme belongs to the family of oxidoreductases, specifically those acting on paired donors, with oxygen as oxidant and incorporation or reduction of oxygen. The oxygen incorporated need not be derived from O_{2} with reduced iron-sulfur protein as one donor, and incorporation of one atom of oxygen into the other donor. The systematic name of this enzyme class is alkane, reduced-rubredoxin:oxygen 1-oxidoreductase. Other names in common use include alkane 1-hydroxylase, omega-hydroxylase, fatty acid omega-hydroxylase, alkane monooxygenase, 1-hydroxylase, AlkB, and alkane hydroxylase. It contains a diiron non-heme active site.

Recently two crystal structures of the enzyme have appeared that provide much more information about the structure of the enzyme. Both structures show an unusual diiron active site where the two iron ions are separated by more than 5 angstroms. Neither structure shows evidence for a ligand that would bridge the two iron ions.
