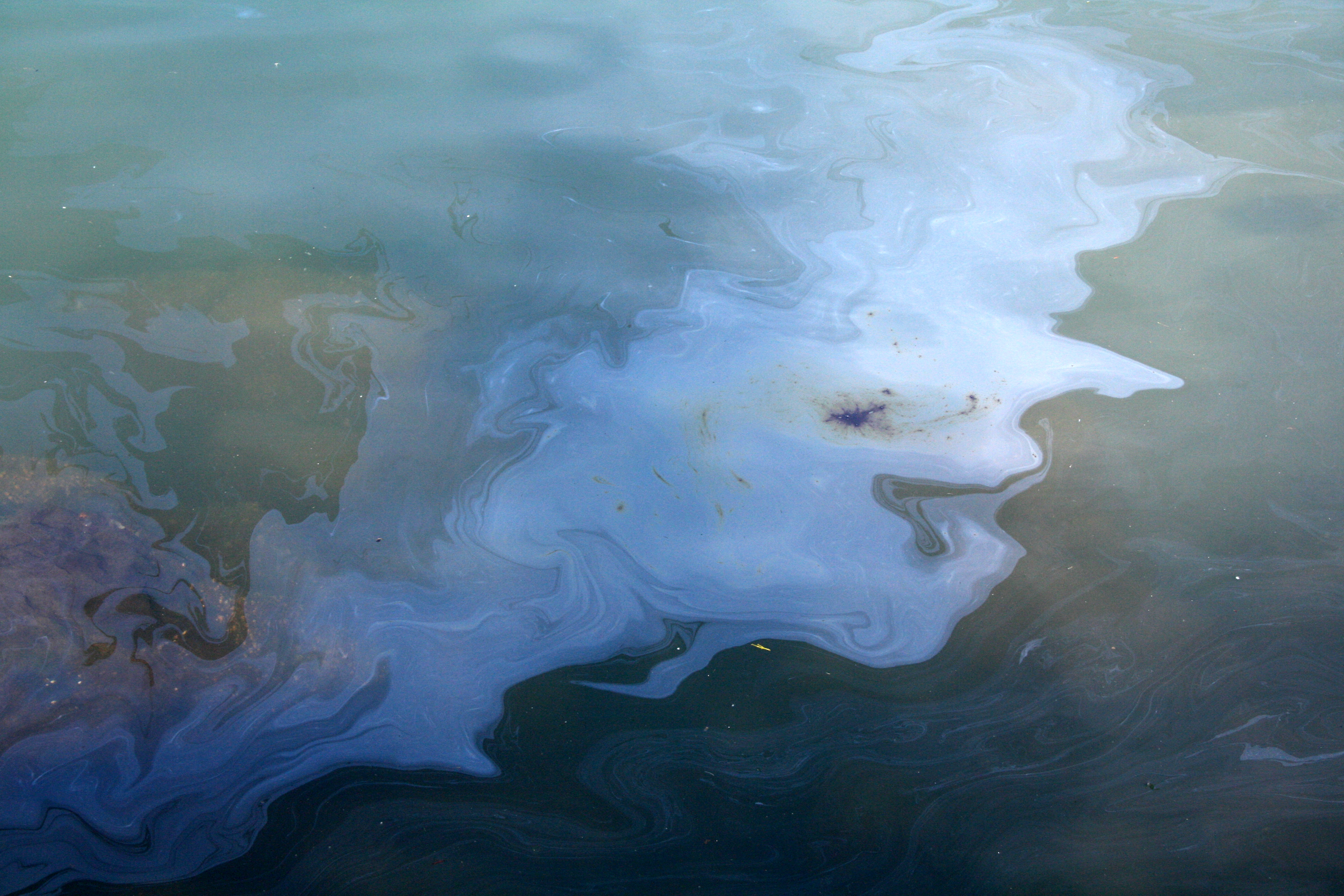
- An oil spill being treated with Alcanivorax

Scientific classification
- Domain: Bacteria
- Kingdom: Pseudomonadati
- Phylum: Pseudomonadota
- Class: Gammaproteobacteria
- Order: Oceanospirillales
- Family: Alcanivoracaceae
- Genus: Alcanivorax; Yakimov et al. 1998

Type species
- Alcanivorax borkumensis

Species
- See text.

Synonyms
- Fundibacter Bruns and Berthe-Corti 1999

= Alcanivorax =

Genus of bacteria

Alcanivorax is a genus of alkane-degrading marine bacteria.

== Species ==
Alcanivorax comprises the following species:

- Alcanivorax balearicus Rivas et al. 2007
- Alcanivorax borkumensis Yakimov et al. 1998
- Alcanivorax dieselolei Liu and Shao 2005
- Alcanivorax gelatiniphagus Kwon et al. 2015
- Alcanivorax hongdengensis Wu et al. 2009
- Alcanivorax indicus Song et al. 2018
- Alcanivorax jadensis (Bruns and Berthe-Corti 1999) Fernández-Martínez et al. 2003
- Alcanivorax limicola Zhu et al. 2021
- Alcanivorax marinus Lai et al. 2013
- Alcanivorax mobilis Yang et al. 2018
- Alcanivorax nanhaiticus Lai et al. 2016
- Alcanivorax pacificus Lai et al. 2011
- Alcanivorax profundi Liu et al. 2019
- Alcanivorax profundimaris Dong et al. 2021
- Alcanivorax sediminis Liao et al. 2020
- Alcanivorax venustensis Fernández-Martínez et al. 2003
- Alcanivorax xenomutans Rahul et al. 2014
