= Bioremediation of oil spills =

Bioremediation of petroleum contaminated environments is a process in which the biological pathways within microorganisms or plants are used to degrade or sequester toxic hydrocarbons, heavy metals, and other volatile organic compounds found within fossil fuels. Oil spills happen frequently at varying degrees along with all aspects of the petroleum supply chain, presenting a complex array of issues for both environmental and public health. While traditional cleanup methods such as chemical or manual containment and removal often result in rapid results, bioremediation is less labor-intensive, expensive, and averts chemical or mechanical damage. The efficiency and effectiveness of bioremediation efforts are based on maintaining ideal conditions, such as pH, RED-OX potential, temperature, moisture, oxygen abundance, nutrient availability, soil composition, and pollutant structure, for the desired organism or biological pathway to facilitate reactions. Three main types of bioremediation used for petroleum spills include microbial remediation, phytoremediation, and mycoremediation. Bioremediation has been implemented in various notable oil spills including the 1989 Exxon Valdez incident where the application of fertilizer on affected shoreline increased rates of biodegradation.

== Oil spills ==
Petroleum contamination of both terrestrial and marine environments results from prospection, extraction, refinement, transport, and storage of oil. Oil spills have been a global issue since the emergence of the oil industry in the early 1900s. The risk of unintentional and intentional spillage has increased as the energy industry and global demand expand. Petroleum is a toxic mixture of organic compounds, trace amounts of heavy metals, and hydrocarbons including many persistent volatile organic compounds (VOCs) and polycyclic aromatic hydrocarbons (PAHs). Discharged into marine environments oil is particularly damaging due to rapid dispersal and the creation of secondary pollutants through photolysis. Petroleum bioaccumulation in terrestrial and marine food chains cause both acute and long term health effects. Exposure to oil damages critical functions within organisms including reproduction, regulation of physiological and chemical processes, and organ function. Large spills alter ecosystem dynamics leading to algae blooms and a mass die-off of marine life. It is estimated that over 1000 sea otters, along with many birds, died from the Exxon Valdez spill.

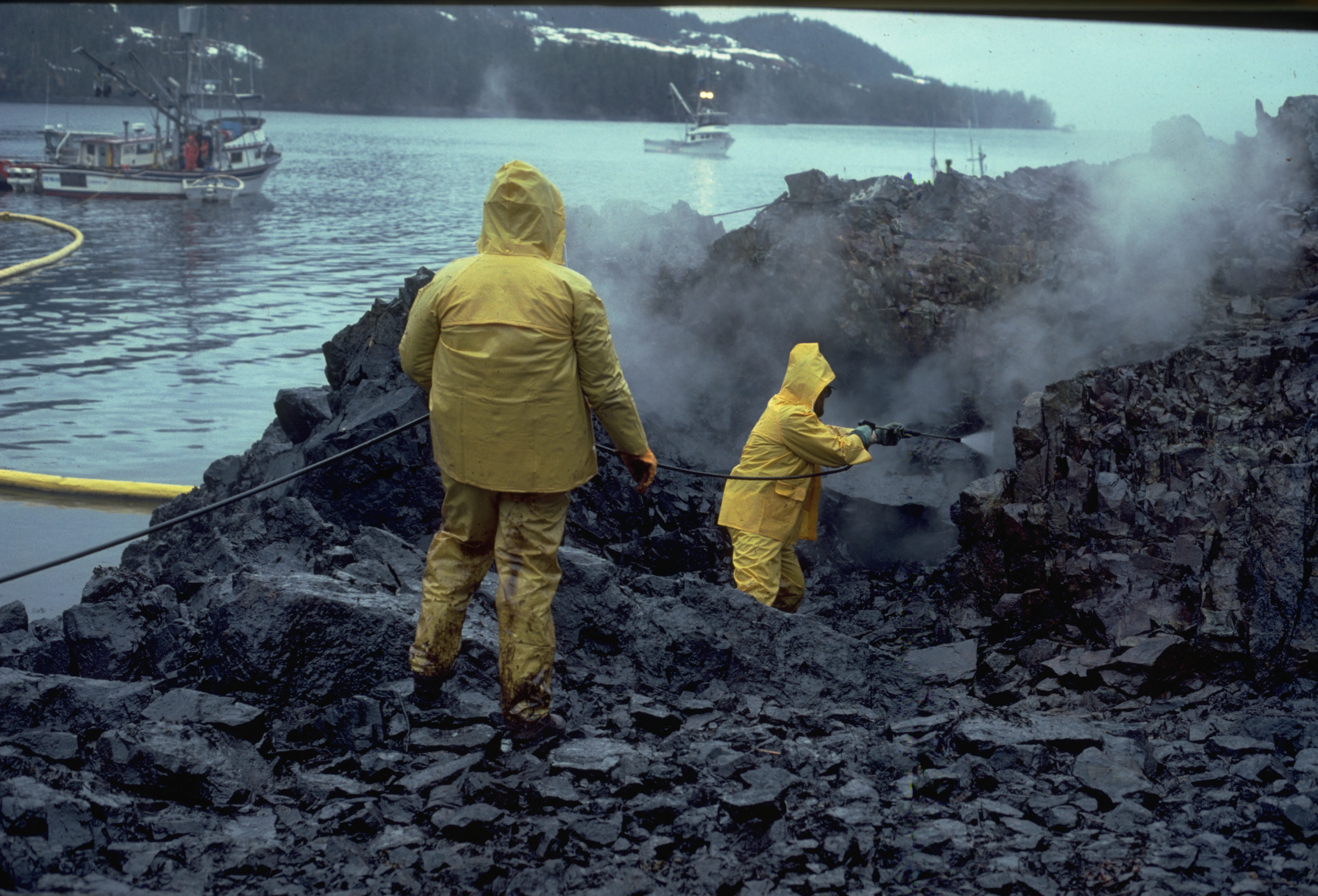
High-pressure, hot-water washing of a shoreline following the Exxon Valdez oil spill

Oil spill clean up efforts commonly employ multiple methods in tandem. Controlled burning and barriers were both used as manual remediation efforts following the Exxon Valdez incident. Chemical solvents and dispersants were briefly used by Exxon in water surrounding the Valdez although discontinued as they required specific conditions and contained carcinogenic compounds. Bioremediation techniques used in the Exxon Valdez spill included nitrogen and phosphorus seeding along coastline increasing available nutrients for indigenous petroleum degrading microorganisms doubling rates of decomposition. Across all remediation techniques less than ten percent of the oil released from Exxon Valdez tanker was recovered. Many genera of plant, microbes, and fungi have demonstrated oil remediating properties including Spartina, Haloscarcia, Rhizophora, Nocardioides, Dietzia, and Microbacterium.

== Bioremediation ==
Bioremediation refers to the use of specific microorganisms or plants to metabolize and remove harmful substances. These organisms are known for their biochemical and physical affinity to hydrocarbons among other pollutants. Various types of bacteria, archaea, algae, fungi, and some species of plants are all able to break down specific toxic waste products into safer constituents. Bioremediation is classified by the organism responsible for remediation with three major subdivisions: microbial remediation, phytoremediation, and mycoremediation. In most cases, bioremediation works to either increase the numbers of naturally occurring microorganisms or add pollutant-specific microbes to the area. Bioremediation can involve using many varieties of microorganisms as well, either synergistically or independently of each other. The costs and environmental impacts of bioremediation are often negligible when compared to traditional manual or chemical remediation efforts.

== Bioremediation of petroleum ==
Due to their ubiquity across environments, many organisms have evolved to use the hydrocarbons and organic compounds in petroleum as energy while simultaneously denaturing toxins through molecular transfer mechanisms.

Microbial bioremediation uses aerobic and anaerobic properties of various microbes to respire and ferment compounds transforming toxins into innocuous compounds. These resulting compounds exhibit more neutral pH levels, increased solubility in water, and are less reactive molecularly. Baseline populations of oil-degrading microorganisms typically account for less than 1% of microbiomes associated with marine ecosystems. Remediation techniques which remove reaction limiting factors through the addition of substrate, can boost microbe population towards 10% of the ecosystems microbiome. Dependent on physical and chemical properties, petroleum-degenerative microorganisms take longer to degrade compounds with high-molecular-weight, such as polycyclic aromatic hydrocarbons (PAH's). These microbes require a wide array of enzymes for the breakdown of petroleum, and very specific nutrient compositions to work at an efficient rate.

Microbes work in a step-wise fashion to breakdown and metabolize the components of petroleum.

1. Linear Alkanes
2. Branched Alkanes
3. Small aromatic compounds
4. Cyclic Alkanes

Treatments that use these breakdown processes most commonly use heat and chemicals to extend the efficacy. Later, more biological systems are used for specific ecosystems that use specific mechanisms.

Phytoremediation is a process in which plants are used to sequester toxins and hydrocarbons into plant tissue from contaminated soils. The main mechanisms for phytoremediation stem from complex relationships between roots and rhizobia. Plants secrete sugars, enzymes, and oxygen from roots which provide necessary substrates for rhizobia and associated rhizosphere microbes to stimulate degradation of organic pollutants. Studies have demonstrated the bioaccumulation abilities of various plants with rhizobial associations, in particular Chromolaena odorata were able to remove 80% of petroleum and heavy metal toxins from soils. While more commonly used on terrestrial environments, contaminated marine environments also benefit from plants based bioremediation through the use of various algae and macrophytes. Phytoremediation is most effective when used in conjunction with microbial remediation and Mycoremediation.

Mycoremediation techniques make use of pollutant tolerant fungi which sequester or denature environmental toxins particularly heavy metals. Toxins are sequestered into highly absorbent molecules such chitin and glucan which are found in fungal cell walls. Saccharomyces cerevisiae (baker's yeast) can be used to remediate heavy metal contaminated marine ecosystems, with 80% to 90% success in the case of arsenic. Polycyclic aromatic hydrocarbons (PAH) concentrations of soil samples taken from contaminated oil drilling cuttings in Nigeria have been decreased by 7% to 19% using white rot fungi under experimental conditions. Soil contaminated with crude oil displays toxic levels of various heavy metals such as lead, zinc and magnesium. Application of mycoremediation techniques to crude contaminated soils have shown significant reductions of heavy metal concentrations.

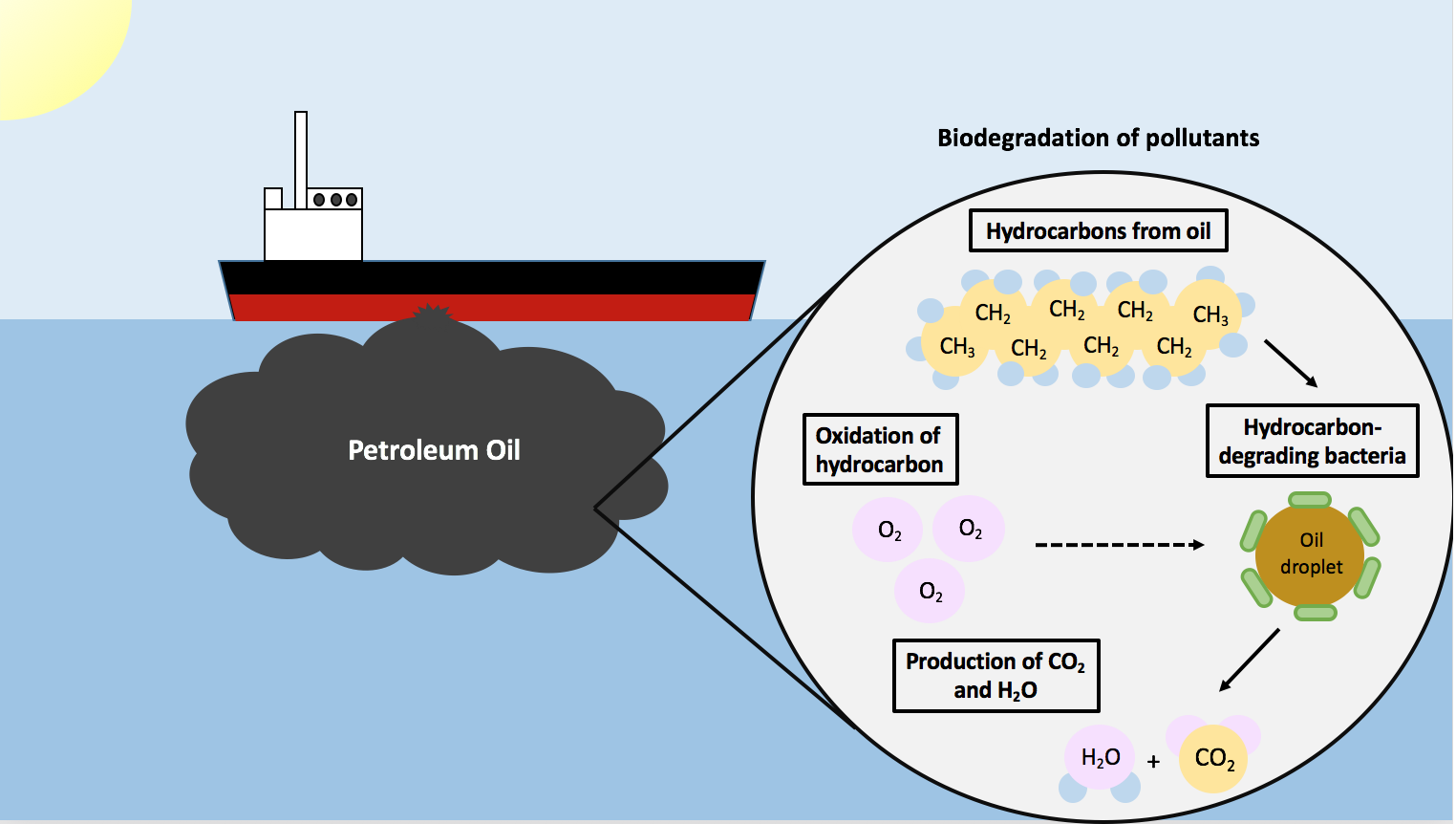
Mechanisms involved in bioremediation of toxic compounds.

=== Bioremediation parameters ===
The efficiency and efficacy of each method of remediation has limitations. The goal of remediation is to eliminate the environmental pollutant as quickly as possible; only inefficient processes require human intervention. Environmental factors such as requirements of reaction, mobility of substances, and physiological needs of organisms will affect the rate and degree that contaminants are degraded. Over time, many of these requirements are overcome. This is when petroleum degrading bacteria and archaea are able to mediate oil spills most efficiently. Weathering and environmental factors play large roles in the success of bioremediation. Interacting soil and pollutant chemicals truly account for the work that can be completed by these microorganisms. These processes change the soil composition and layering, along with the biochemistry of the ecosystem. These chemical and biological changes require adaptation from soil microbes to bioremediate. The susceptibility of the pollutant is also important to consider. Properties such as solubility, temperature, and pH will affect bioremediation and affect the process. Pollutants that are more soluble will be easier for microbes to transform into the environment. Otherwise, pollutants with rigid molecular structures extend bioremediation as they are harder to convert into innocuous substances. Bioaccessibility, the amount of pollutant available for absorption, and bioavailability of pollutant will affect efficiency as well. In many instances, needed nutrients are collected and allocated for petroleum degrading microorganisms in order to maximize the efficiency of the process. Providing microorganisms with the nutrients and conditions they need allow them to thrive.

=== Factors that affect bioremediation ===
- pH
- RED-OX reaction potential
- Temperature
- Moisture
- Oxygen and other molecules present
- Nutrient availability
- Soil composition
- Solubility of pollutant

== Bioremediation mechanisms ==
Microorganisms use many unique mechanisms to convert molecules and transfer electrons.
Bioremediation Technique	Conversion	Products
Aerobic Respiration	Petroleum substrate with molecular oxygen	Nitrogen Gas, Hydrogen Sulfide, Methane, Metals, Carbon Dioxide, Water
Inorganic Electron Donation	Ammonium, Nitrite, Iron, Manganese are oxidized.	Nitrate, Nitrite, Iron, Manganese, Sulfate
Fermentation	Toxic petroleum compounds of organic nature	Harmless Compounds, Fermentation Products
Demobilization	Iron, Sulfate, Mercury, Chromium, Uranium	Ferric Hydroxide, Sulfide, Pyrite, Reduced Chromium, Uraninite
Reductive Dehalogenation	Halogen compound with electron donor	Reduced contaminant

Listed above, the chemicals required and products formed in petroleum degradation are shown. These microbes will reduce, oxidize, ferment, and demobilize the constituents of oil spills over time, and create innocuous compounds. Bioremediation techniques involve using these mechanisms to reduce pollutant amounts and are dependent on pollutant aspects:

=== Ex situ bioremediation ===
Ex situ remediation refers to reactions performed outside the natural habitat of these organisms.

- Increased microbial activities through aeration, irrigation, and creation of biochemical-piles.
- Increased degradation activities via turning of polluted soils and addition of minerals and water.
- The use of bioreactors, to enhance and speed up the biological reactions of microorganisms to decrease bioremediation time.
- Farming techniques that call for addition of nutrients in soil to stimulate microbial mechanisms

=== In situ bioremediation ===
In situ remediation refers to reactions performed inside a reaction mixture.

- Bio-venting, using moisture and nutrients to enhance the transformation of pollutants to more innocent substances.
- Bio-slurping, using pumping to apply oxygen and water, thus separating and compiling soils to increase remediation of microbes.
- Bio-sparging, where air is pushed into soil to stimulate microbial bioremediation.
- Phytoremediation, uses the mechanisms of plants to decrease efficacy of pollutants

== See also ==
- Petroleum microbiology
