= Alcanivoracaceae =

Scientific classification
- Domain: Bacteria
- Kingdom: Pseudomonadati
- Phylum: Pseudomonadota
- Class: Gammaproteobacteria
- Order: Oceanospirillales
- Family: Alcanivoracaceae corrig. Golyshin et al. 2005

Type genus
- Alcanivorax Yakimov et al. 1998

Genera
- Alcanivorax Yakimov et al. 1998; Kangiella Kim et al. 2018; Ketobacter Knobloch et al. 2019

Family of bacteria

Alcanivoracaceae is a family of Pseudomonadota. Cells of the species are rod-shaped.
