= Greywater =

Type of wastewater generated in households without toilet wastewater

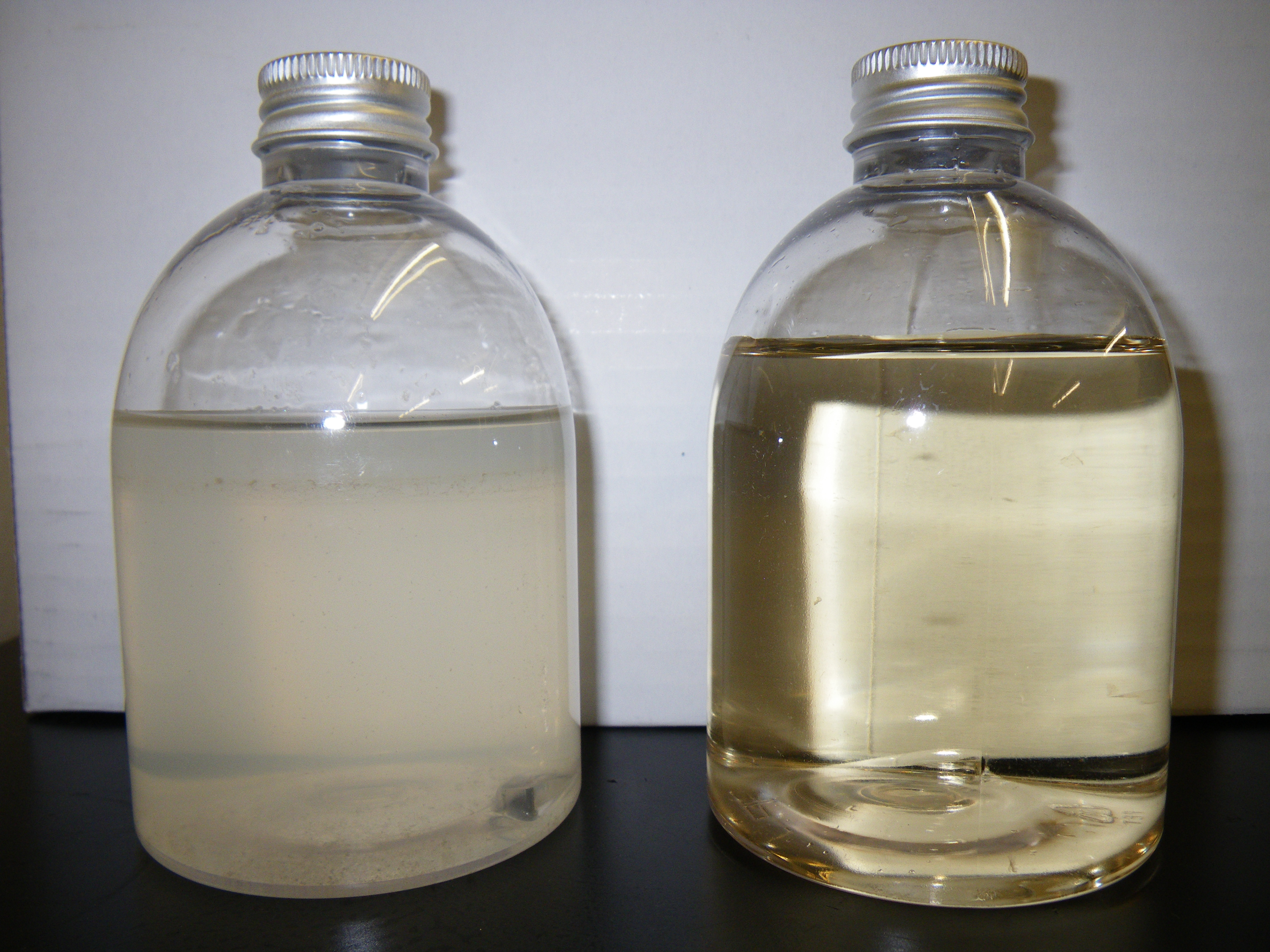
Left: greywater sample from an office building. Right: Same greywater after treatment in membrane bioreactor

Greywater or sullage (also spelled graywater in the United States and sometimes written as two words: grey water, gray water) is domestic wastewater generated in households or office buildings from streams without substantial fecal contamination, i.e. all streams except for the wastewater from toilets. Sources of greywater include sinks, showers, baths, washing machines or dishwashers. As greywater contains fewer pathogens than blackwater, it is generally safer to handle and easier to treat and reuse onsite for toilet flushing, landscape or crop irrigation, and other non-potable uses. Greywater may still have some pathogen content from laundering soiled clothing or cleaning the anal area in the shower or bath.

The application of greywater reuse in urban water systems provides substantial benefits for both the water supply subsystem, by reducing the demand for fresh clean water, and the wastewater subsystems by reducing the amount of conveyed and treated wastewater. Treated greywater has many uses, such as toilet flushing or irrigation.

== Overview ==
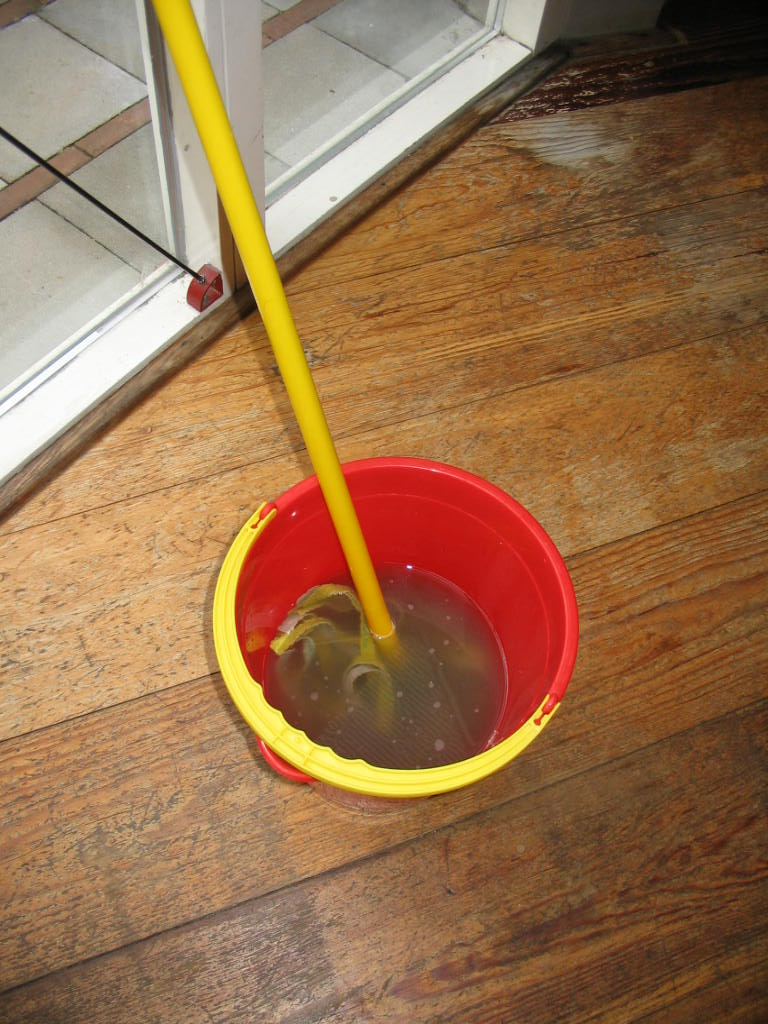
Example of a source of greywater in the household: dirty water from cleaning the floor

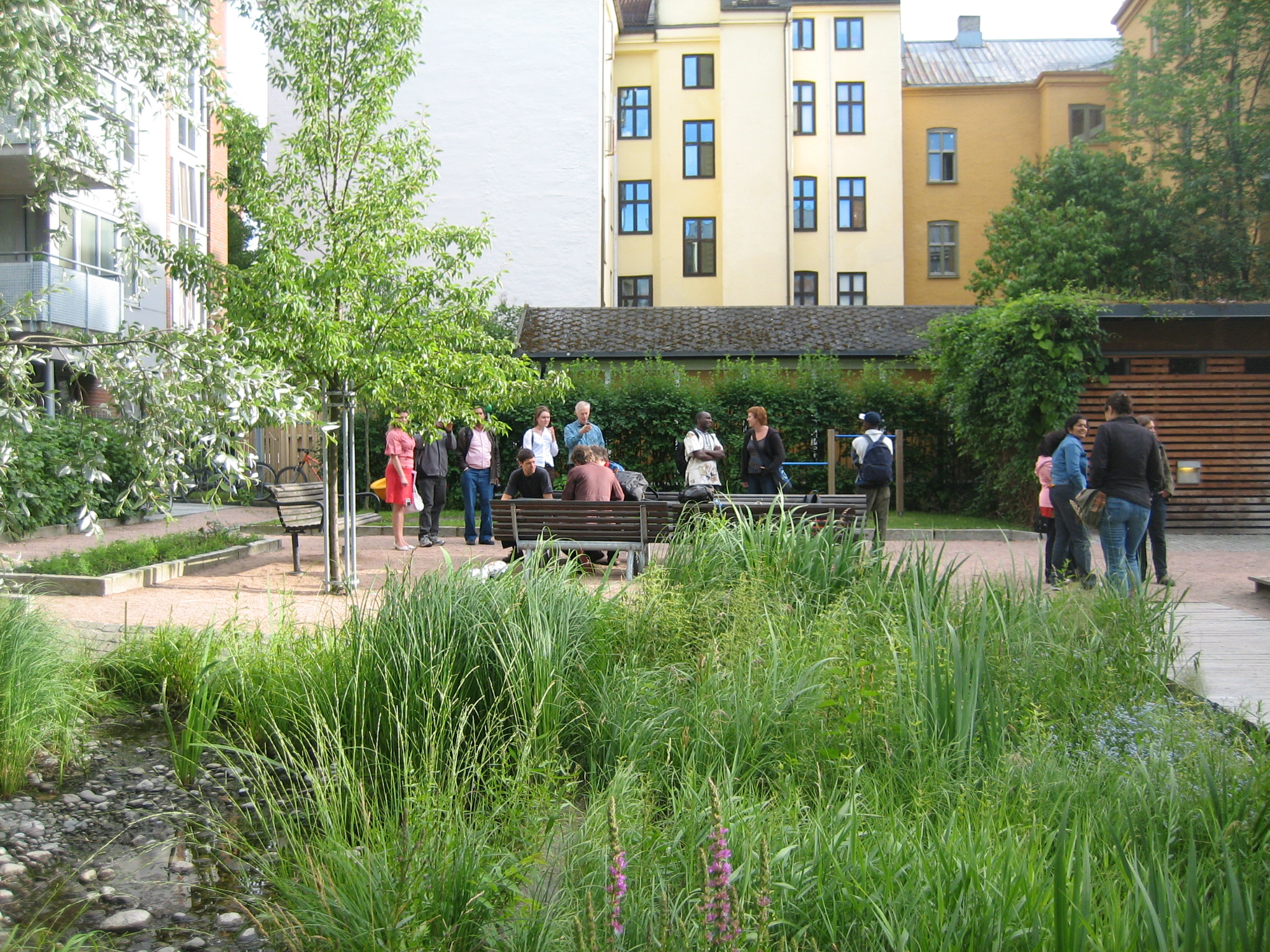
Urban decentralized greywater treatment with constructed wetland in Oslo

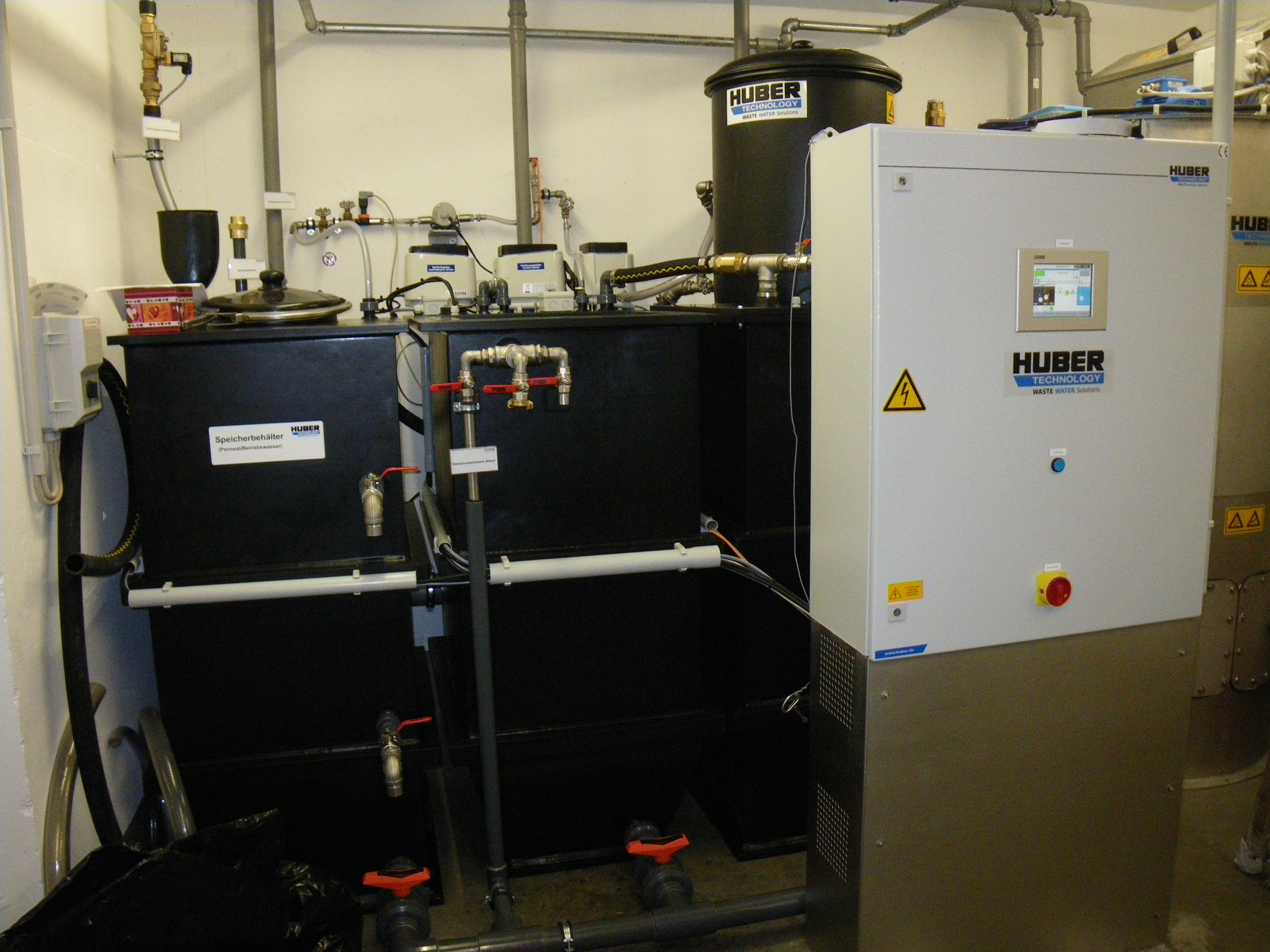
Greywater treatment plant with membrane bioreactor in the basement of an office building in Frankfurt

=== Quality ===
Greywater usually contains some traces of human waste and is therefore not free of pathogens. The excreta come from washing the anal area in the bath and shower or from the laundry (washing underwear and diapers). The quality of greywater can deteriorate rapidly during storage because it is often warm and contains some nutrients and organic matter (e.g. dead skin cells), as well as pathogens. Stored greywater also leads to odour nuisances for the same reason.

Synthetic personal care products (e.g. toothpaste, face wash, and shower gel) commonly rinsed into greywater may contain microbeads, a form of microplastics. Greywater originating from washing clothes made from synthetic fabrics (e.g. nylon) is also likely to contain microfibers.

=== Quantity ===
In households with conventional flush toilets, greywater makes up about 65% of the total wastewater produced by that household. It may be a good source of water for reuse because there is a close relationship between the production of greywater and the potential demand for toilet flushing water.

=== Practical aspects ===
Misconnections of pipes can cause greywater tanks to contain a percentage of blackwater.

The small traces of feces that enter the greywater stream via effluent from the shower, sink, or washing machine do not pose practical hazards under normal conditions, as long as the greywater is used correctly (for example, percolated from a dry well or used correctly in farming irrigation).

== Treatment processes ==
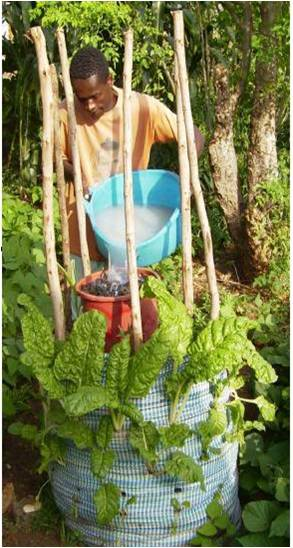
Greywater "towers" are used to treat and reuse greywater in Arba Minch

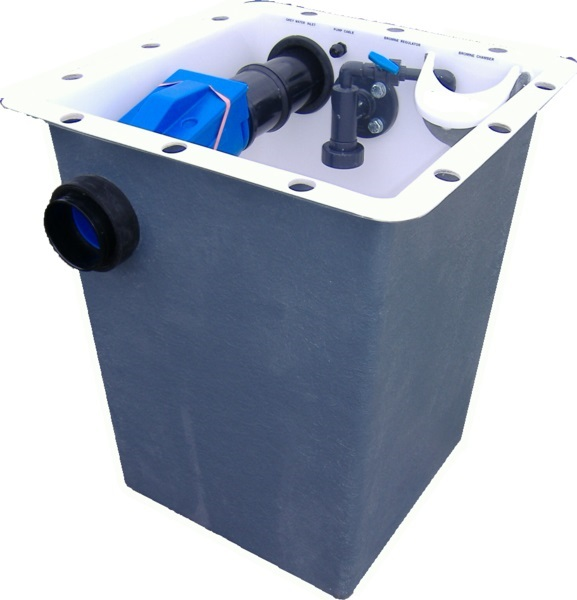
Underground greywater recycling tank

The separate treatment of greywater falls under the concept of source separation, which is one principle commonly applied in ecological sanitation approaches. The main advantage of keeping greywater separate from toilet wastewater is that the pathogen load is greatly reduced, and the greywater is therefore easier to treat and reuse.

When greywater is mixed with toilet wastewater, it is called sewage or blackwater and should be treated in sewage treatment plants or an onsite sewage facility, which is often a septic system.

Greywater from kitchen sinks contains fats, oils and grease, and high loads of organic matter. It should undergo preliminary treatment to remove these substances before discharge into a greywater tank. If this is difficult to apply, it could be directed to the sewage system or to an existing sewer.

Most greywater is easier to treat and recycle than sewage because of lower levels of contaminants. If collected using a separate plumbing system from blackwater, domestic greywater can be recycled directly within the home, garden or company and used either immediately or processed and stored. If stored, it must be used within a very short time or it will begin to putrefy due to the organic solids in the water. Recycled greywater of this kind is never safe to drink, but a number of treatment steps can be used to provide water for washing or flushing toilets.

The treatment processes that can be used are in principle the same as those used for sewage treatment, except that they are usually installed on a smaller scale (decentralized level), often at household or building level:

- Biological systems such as constructed wetlands or living walls and more natural 'backyard' small scale systems, such as small ponds or biodiverse landscapes that naturally purify greywater.
- Bioreactors or more compact systems such as membrane bioreactors which are a variation of the activated sludge process and is also used to treat sewage.
- Mechanical systems (sand filtration, lava filter systems and systems based on UV radiation)

In constructed wetlands, the plants use contaminants of greywater, such as food particles, as nutrients in their growth. Salt and soap residues can be toxic to microbial and plant life alike, but can be absorbed and degraded through constructed wetlands and aquatic plants such as sedges, rushes, and grasses.

== Reuse ==
Global water resource supplies are shrinking. According to a report from the United Nations, water shortages will affect 2.7 billion people by 2025, which means 1 out of every 3 people in the world will be affected by this problem. Reusing greywater has become a good way to solve this problem, and wastewater reuse is also called recycled or reclaimed water.

=== Benefits ===
Demand on conventional water supplies and pressure on sewage treatment systems is reduced by the use of greywater. Re-using greywater also reduces the volume of sewage effluent entering watercourses which can be ecologically beneficial. In times of drought, especially in urban areas, greywater use in irrigation or toilet systems helps to achieve some of the goals of ecologically sustainable development.

The potential ecological benefits of greywater recycling include:

- Reduced freshwater extraction from rivers and aquifers
- Less impact from septic tank and treatment plant infrastructure
- Reduced energy use and chemical pollution from treatment
- Groundwater recharge
- Reclamation of nutrients
- Greater quality of surface and ground water when preserved by the natural purification in the top layers of soil than generated water treatment processes

In the U.S. Southwest and the Middle East where available water supplies are limited, especially in view of a rapidly growing population, a strong imperative exists for adoption of alternative water technologies.

The potential economic benefits of greywater recycling include:

- Can reduce the demand for fresh water, and when people reduce the use of fresh water, the cost of domestic water consumption is significantly reduced, while alleviating the pressure of global water resources.
- Can reduce the amount of wastewater entering the sewer or on-site treatment system.

=== Safety ===
Greywater use for irrigation appears to be a safe practice. A 2015 epidemiological study found no additional burden of disease among greywater users irrigating arid regions. The safety of reuse of greywater as potable water has also been studied. A few organic micropollutants including benzene were found in greywater in significant concentrations but most pollutants were in very low concentrations. Fecal contamination, peripheral pathogens (e.g., skin and mucous tissue), and food-derived pathogens are the three major sources of pathogens in greywater.

Greywater reuse in toilet flushing and garden irrigation may produce aerosols. These could transmit legionella disease and bring a potential health risk for people. However, the result of the research shows that the health risk due to reuse of greywater either for garden irrigation or toilet flushing was not significantly higher than the risk associated with using clear water for the same activities.

=== Irrigation ===
Most greywater should be assumed to have some blackwater-type components, including pathogens. Greywater should be applied below the surface where possible (e.g., via drip line on top of the soil, under mulch; or in mulch-filled trenches) and not sprayed, as there is a danger of inhaling the water as an aerosol.

In any greywater system, it is important to avoid toxic materials such as bleaches, bath salts, artificial dyes, chlorine-based cleansers, strong acids/alkali, solvents, and products containing boron, which is toxic to plants at high levels. Most cleaning agents contain sodium salts, which can cause excessive soil alkalinity, inhibit seed germination, and destroy the structure of soils by dispersing clay. Soils watered with greywater systems can be amended with gypsum (calcium sulfate) to reduce pH. Cleaning products containing ammonia are safe to use, as plants can use it to obtain nitrogen. A 2010 study of greywater irrigation found no major health effects on plants, and suggests sodium buildup is largely dependent on the degree to which greywater migrates vertically through the soil.

Some greywater may be applied directly from the sink to the garden or container field, receiving further treatment from soil life and plant roots.

The use of non-toxic and low-sodium soap and personal care products is recommended to protect vegetation when reusing greywater for irrigation purposes.

=== Indoor reuse ===
Recycled greywater from showers and bathtubs can be used for flushing toilets in most European and Australian jurisdictions and in United States jurisdictions that have adopted the International Plumbing Code.

Such a system could provide an estimated 30% reduction in water use for the average household. The danger of biological contamination is avoided by using:

- A cleaning tank, to eliminate floating and sinking items
- An intelligent control mechanism that flushes the collected water if it has been stored long enough to be hazardous; this completely avoids the problems of filtration and chemical treatment

Greywater recycling without treatment is used in certain dwellings for applications where potable water is not required (e.g., garden and land irrigation, toilet flushing). It may also be used in dwellings when the greywater (e.g., from rainwater) is already fairly clean to begin with and/or has not been polluted with non-degradable chemicals such as non-natural soaps (thus using natural cleaning products instead). It is not recommended to use water that has been in the greywater filtration system for more than 24 hours as bacteria builds up, affecting the water that is being reused.

Due to the limited treatment technology, the treated greywater still contains some chemicals and bacteria, so some safety issues should be observed when using the treated greywater around the home.

A clothes washer grey water system is sized to recycle the grey water of a one or two family home using the reclaimed water of a washing machine (produces 15 gallons per person per day). It relies on either the pump from the washing machine or gravity to irrigate. This particular system is the most common and least restricted system. In most states with in the United States, this system does not require construction permits. This system is often characterized as Laundry to Landscape (L2L). The system relies on valves, draining to a mulch basin, or the area of irrigation for certain landscape features (a mulch basin for a tree requires 12.6 ft^{2}). The drip system must be calibrated to avoid uneven distribution of grey water or overloading.

Recycled grey water from domestic appliances also can be used to flush toilet. Its application is based on standards set by plumbing codes. Indoor grey water reuse requires an efficient cleaning tank for insoluble waste, as well as a well regulated control mechanism.

The Uniform Plumbing Code, adopted in some U.S. jurisdictions, prohibits greywater use indoors. However, the California Plumbing Code, derived from the UPC, permits it.

=== Heat reclamation ===
Devices are currently available that capture heat from residential and industrial greywater through a process called drain water heat recovery, greywater heat recovery, or hot water heat recycling.

Rather than flowing directly into a water heating device, incoming cold water flows first through a heat exchanger where it is pre-warmed by heat from greywater flowing out from such activities as dish washing or showering. Typical household devices receiving greywater from a shower can recover up to 60% of the heat that would otherwise go to waste.

== Regulations ==
=== United States ===
Government regulation governing domestic greywater use for landscape irrigation (diversion for reuse) is still a developing area and continues to gain wider support as the actual risks and benefits are considered and put into clearer perspective.

"Greywater" (by pure legal definition) is considered in some jurisdictions to be "sewage" (all wastewater including greywater and toilet waste), but in the U.S. states that adopt the International Plumbing Code, it can be used for subsurface irrigation and for toilet flushing, and in states that adopt the Uniform Plumbing Code, it can be used in underground disposal fields that are akin to shallow sewage disposal fields.

Wyoming allows surface and subsurface irrigation and other non-specific use of greywater under a Department of Environmental Quality policy enacted in March 2010. California, Utah, New Mexico and some other states allow true subsurface drip irrigation with greywater. Where greywater is still considered sewage, it is bound by the same regulatory procedures enacted to ensure properly engineered septic tank and effluent disposal systems are installed for long system life and to control spread of disease and pollution. In such regulatory jurisdictions, this has commonly meant domestic greywater diversion for landscape irrigation was either not permitted or was discouraged by expensive and complex sewage system approval requirements. Wider legitimate community greywater diversion for landscape irrigation has subsequently been handicapped and resulted in greywater reuse continuing to still be widely undertaken by householders outside of and in preference to the legal avenues.

However, with water conservation becoming a necessity in a growing number of jurisdictions, business, political and community pressure has made regulators seriously reconsider the actual risks against actual benefits.

It is now recognized and accepted by an increasing number of regulators that the microbiological risks of greywater reuse at the single dwelling level where inhabitants already had intimate knowledge of that greywater are in reality an insignificant risk, when properly managed without the need for onerous approval processes. This is reflected in the New South Wales Government Department of Water and Energy's newly released greywater diversion rules, and the recent passage of greywater legislation in Montana. In the 2009 Legislative Session, the state of Montana passed a bill expanding greywater use into multi-family and commercial buildings. The Department of Environmental Quality has already drafted rules and design guidelines for greywater re-use systems in all these applications. Existing staff would review systems proposed for new subdivisions in conjunction with review of all other wastewater system components.

Strict permit requirements in Austin, Texas, led to issuance of only one residential graywater permit since 2010. A working group formed to streamline the permitting process, and in 2013, the city created new code that has eased the requirements, resulting in four more permits.

In California, a push has been made in recent years to address greywater in connection with the State's greenhouse gas reduction goals (see AB 32). As a large amount of energy (electricity) is used for pumping, treating and transporting potable water within the state, water conservation has been identified as one of several ways California is seeking to reduce greenhouse gas emissions.

In July 2009, the California Building Standards Commission (CBSC) approved the addition of Chapter 16A "Non-potable Water Reuse Systems" to the 2007 California Plumbing Code. Emergency regulations allowing greywater reuse systems were subsequently filed with the California Secretary of State August 2009 and became effective immediately upon filing. Assembly Bill 371 (Goldberg 2006) and Senate Bill 283 (DeSaulnier 2009) directed the California Department of Water Resources (DWR), in consultation with the State Department of Health Services, to adopt and submit to the CBSC regulations for a State version of Appendix J (renamed Chapter 16 Part 2) of the Uniform Plumbing Code to provide design standards to safely plumb buildings with both potable and recycled water systems. November 2009 the CBSC unanimously voted to approve the California Dual Plumbing Code that establishes statewide standards for potable and recycled water plumbing systems in commercial, retail and office buildings, theaters, auditoriums, condominiums, schools, hotels, apartments, barracks, dormitories, jails, prisons and reformatories. In addition, the California Department of Housing and Community Development has greywater standards and DWR has also proposed dual plumbing design standards.

In Arizona, greywater is defined as water with a BOD5 less than 380 mg/L, TSS<430 and the Fats, Oil, and Grease (FOG) content should be less than 75 mg/L. The Arizona water has issued advice that people should avoid direct contact with greywater. Most greywater use is by underground drip irrigation since surface irrigation is not permitted. There are three types of use in Arizona: up to a quota of 400 gpd per family (close to 1500 L per day) no permission is required for greywater use, between 400 and 3000 gpd (1500 and 11,355 L per day, respectively) permission is required and above 3000 gpd (>11,355 L per day) it is considered as conventional wastewater venture. Other limitations include restrictions on contact, restrictions on use on herbaceous food plants, exclusion of hazardous materials and effective separation from surface water run-off.

The Uniform Plumbing Code, adopted in some U.S. jurisdictions, prohibits gray water use indoors.

=== United Kingdom ===
Greywater recycling is relatively uncommon in the UK, largely because the financial cost and environmental impact of mains water is very low. Greywater systems should comply with BS8525 and the Water Supply (Water Fittings) Regulations in order to avoid risks to health.

Greywater from single sewered premises has the potential to be reused on site for ornamental, garden and lawn irrigation, toilet flushing. The reuse options include Horizontal flow reed bed (HFRB), Vertical flow reed bed (VFRB), Green roof water recycling system (GROW), Membrane bioreactor (MBR) and Membrane chemical reactor (MCR).

=== Canada ===
Although Canada is a water-rich country, the center of the country freezes in the winter and droughts happen some summers. There are locations where watering outdoors is restricted in the dry season, some water must be transported from an outside source, or on-site costs are high. At present, the standards for greywater reuse are not strict compared with other countries.

The National Plumbing Code, which is adopted in whole or in part by the provinces, indicates that non-potable water systems should only be used to supply toilets and underground irrigation systems, collecting rainwater with roof gutters is included as a form of greywater. Health Canada has published a guideline to use greywater for toilet flushing and British Columbia's building code includes subsurface irrigation with greywater. In Alberta "Reclaimed wastewater from any source cannot be used domestically unless it is approved and meets water quality testing and monitoring by the local municipality." Saskatchewan also treats greywater as sewage.

=== Australia ===
Household greywater from a single contaminated site may be reused on-site at the ornamental garden and lawn watering, toilet flushing and laundry uses, depending on the type of greywater and treatment level. The Department of Health and Community Services (DHCS) focuses on protecting public health and then takes action to control and minimize the public health risks associated with greywater reuse.

=== Cyprus ===
The government of Cyprus has implemented four water-saving subsidies: drilling installations, drilling with lavatories, installation of hot water circulation systems and installation of greywater recycling systems.

=== Jordan ===
The emphasis on the use of greywater in Jordan has two main purposes: water conservation and socioeconomic aspects. The Amman Islamic Water Development and Management Network (INWRDAM) in Jordan promoted research on gray water reuse in Jordan. At present, greywater research in Jordan is funded mainly by the International Development Research Center (IDRC) in Ottawa, Canada, to install and use greywater systems based on the establishment of small wetland systems in private households. The cost of this system is about 500 US dollars per household.

== See also ==
- Rainwater harvesting
- Water conservation
- Water purification
