= Hostětín =

- Municipality
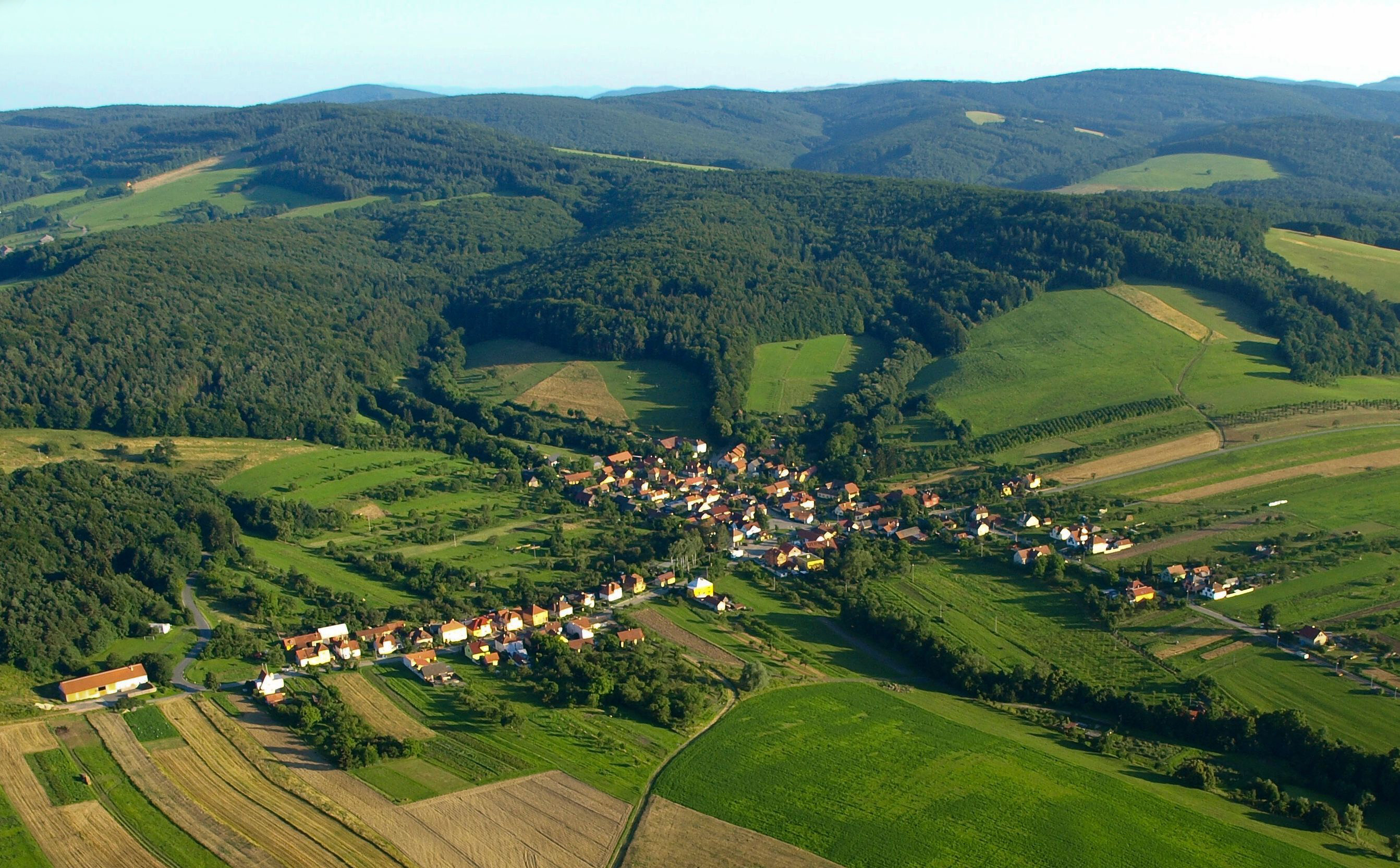
- Aerial view

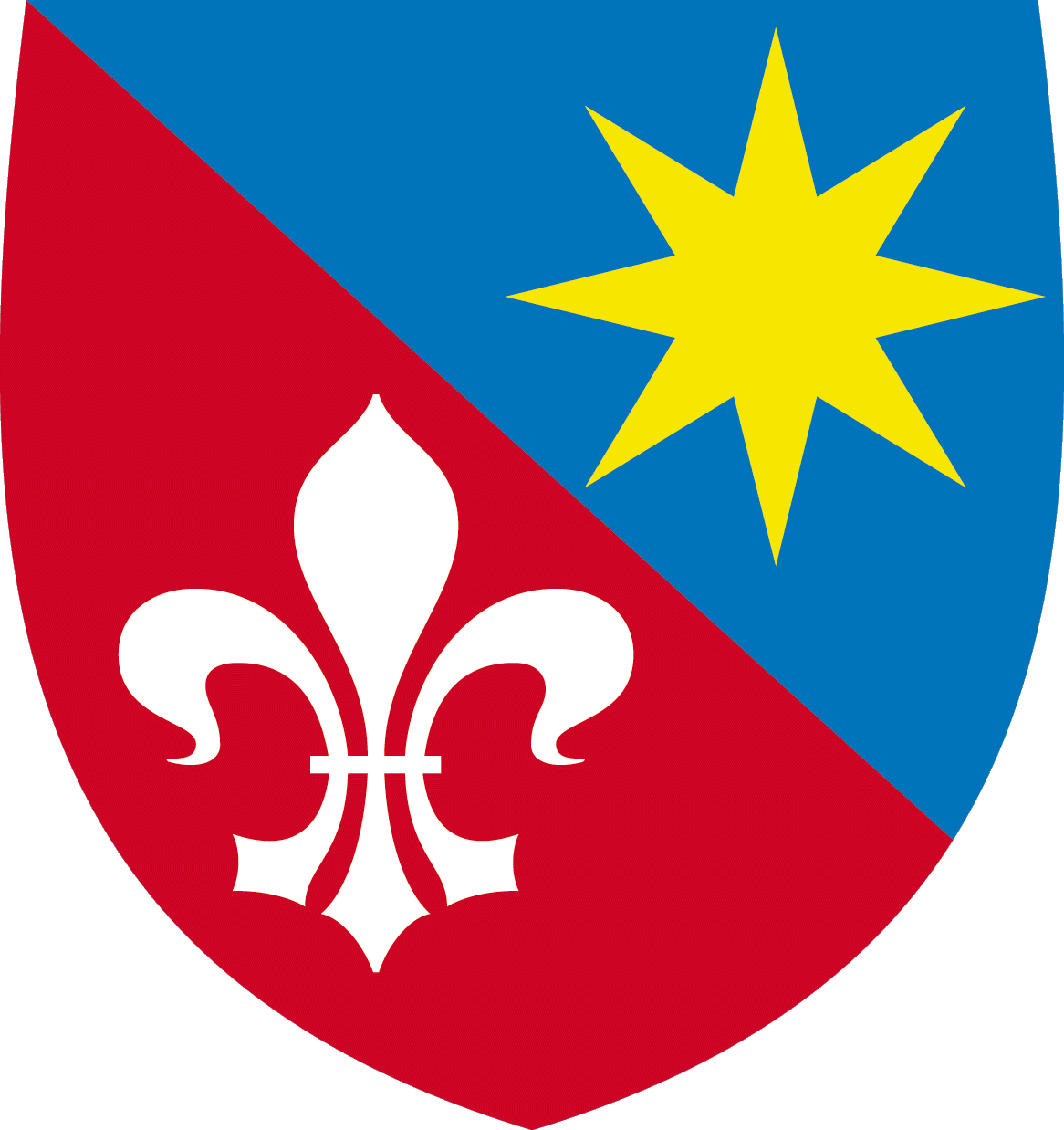
- Flag Coat of arms

- Location in the Czech Republic
- Coordinates: 49°3′0″N 17°52′46″E
- Country: Czech Republic
- Region: Zlín
- District: Uherské Hradiště
- First mentioned: 1412

Area
  - Total: 3.64 km^{2} (1.41 sq mi)
- Elevation: 384 m (1,260 ft)

Population (2026-01-01)
  - Total: 216
  - Density: 59.3/km^{2} (154/sq mi)
- Time zone: UTC+1 (CET)
  - Summer (DST): UTC+2 (CEST)
- Postal code: 687 71
- Website: www.hostetin.cz

Hostětín is a municipality and village in Uherské Hradiště District in the Zlín Region of the Czech Republic. It has about 200 inhabitants.

== Geography ==
Hostětín is located about 24 kilometres (15 mi) southeast of Zlín and 20 km (12 mi) northwest of Trenčín. It lies on the border between the Vizovice Highlands and White Carpathians mountain range. The highest point is at 531 m (1,742 ft) above sea level. The entire municipality lies within the Bílé Karpaty Protected Landscape Area. The Kolelač Stream originates here and flows across the municipal territory.

== History ==
The first written mention of Hostětín is from 1412. In 1516, Hostětín was referred to as an abandoned village, but in 1576 it was repopulated. From 1964 to 1990, Hostětín was a municipal part of Pitín.

== Demographics ==
Historical population

Year	Pop.	±%
1869	256	—
1880	247	−3.5%
1890	260	+5.3%
1900	251	−3.5%
1910	261	+4.0%

Year	Pop.	±%
1921	266	+1.9%
1930	247	−7.1%
1950	224	−9.3%
1961	299	+33.5%
1970	310	+3.7%

Year	Pop.	±%
1980	304	−1.9%
1991	233	−23.4%
2001	227	−2.6%
2011	236	+4.0%
2021	211	−10.6%

Source: Censuses

== Economy and environment ==
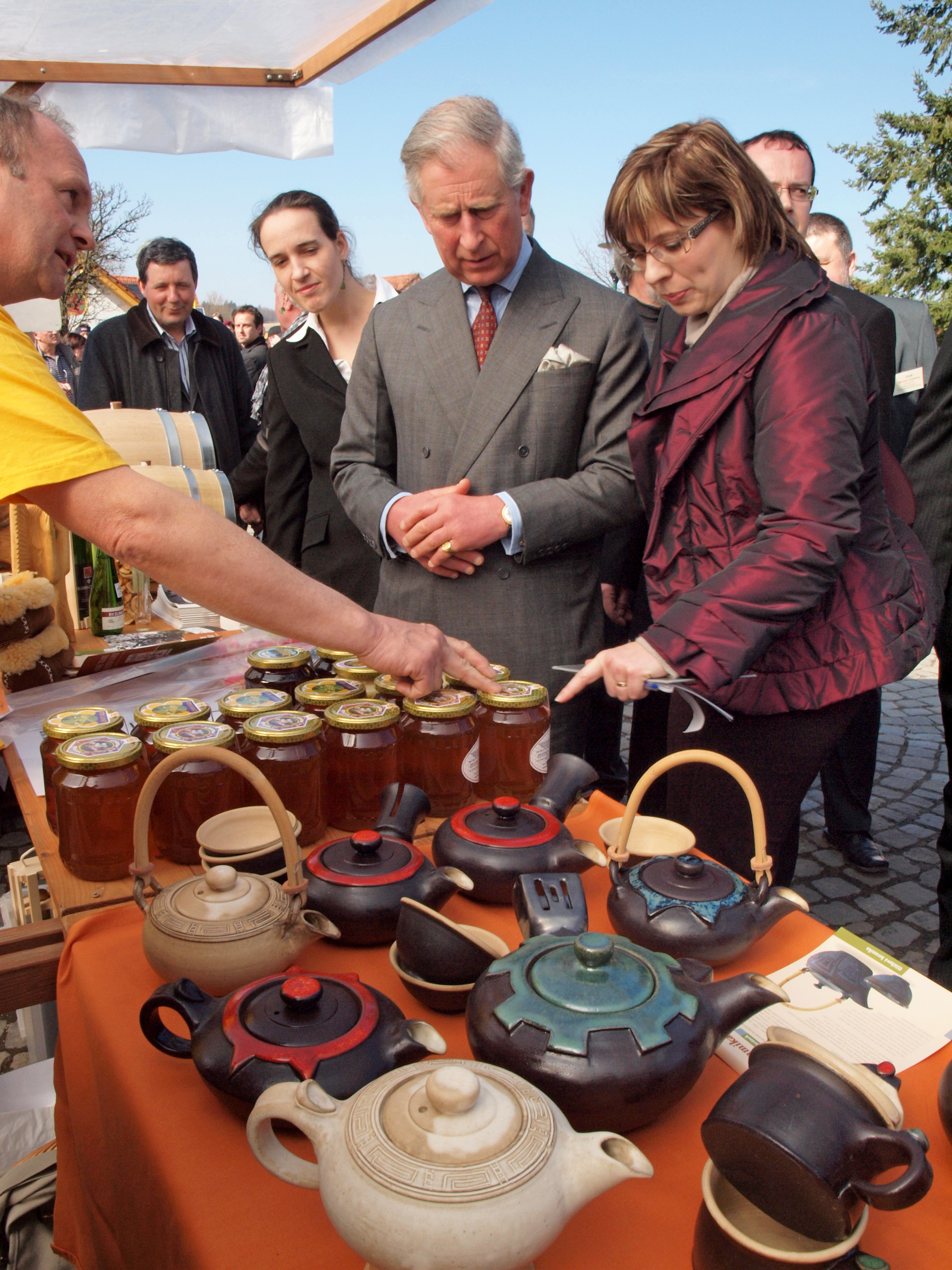
Prince Charles in Hostětín in 2010

The village is known for its environmental activities. Hostětín's municipal wood-chip heating plant began operating in 2000 with support frrm Czech public funding. It burns wood chips and other residues from nearby sawmills and forests and supplies heat and hot water through a district heating network. The network served 69 customers at the end of 2024.

The local association (Tradice Bílých Karpat) opened an organic apple juice plant in 2000 to support fruit growing in the White Carpathians. The Veronica Centre opened its education building in 2006. The building uses heat from the municipal network and from solar collectors. It was described at the time as the first public building in the Czech Republic built to passive-house standards.

In 2010, Charles, Prince of Wales, visited Hostětín and toured the heating plant and the village's wastewater treatment facility.

Andrew Schapiro, ambassador to the Czech Republic of United States visited Hostětín during Earth Day in 2015.

The village received the Czech national Energy Globe award in 2007, the Czech Solar Award in 2009 and a Climate Star award in 2012. In 2020, Hostětín was the overall winner of the Czech E.ON Energy Globe competition.

== Transport ==
Hostětín is located on the railway line Bylnice–Staré Město.

== Sights ==
There are no protected cultural monuments in the municipality. A cultural landmark in the centre of Hostěnín is the Chapel of the Virgin Mary.
