= Wetlands Construídos =

Brazilian startup company

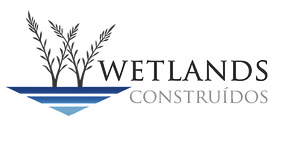
- Industry: Wastewater treatment
- Founded: January 1, 2011 in Belo Horizonte, Brazil
- Founders: André Baxter Barreto
- Areas served: Minas Gerais
- Products: Constructed wetland
- Services: Consulting, Design, Construction
- Website: www.wetlands.com.br

Wetlands Construídos is a Brazilian startup company that specializes in the area of constructed wetland. Its business includes the consulting and implementation of natural systems for water treatment and wastewater - specifically constructed wetland systems. The company was officially founded in 2011 in Belo Horizonte, Minas Gerais by CEO André Baxter Barreto and was incubated in a business incubator known as INOVA UFMG - Incubadora de Empresas at the Federal University of Minas Gerais in 2015.

== History ==
The company begin to shape in 2011 with a group of co-founders consisting of a Sanitary Biologist, Industrial Chemist, Environmental Engineer, Architect and Production Engineer, most of them holding a Master's degree in the fields of Science and Business. CEO André Baxter Barreto, a Master of Science (MSc), works closely with renowned Wastewater Treatment academia, and is expected to receive a doctorate degree in the area of wastewater treatment from the Federal University of Minas Gerais in 2016.

In May 2013, a few of the co-founders participated in the 1st Brazilian Symposium on Wetlands Constructed of Application in Wastewater Treatment at Florianópolis, Santa Catarina.

In early 2015, the company was officially incubated in an incubator, INOVA, at the Federal University of Minas Gerais.

During the second Brazilian Symposium on Constructed Wetland that was held in Paraná in June 2015, CEO André Baxter Barreto was a speaker and presented on the topic "Innovative Method for Pamaters Kinetic Research Beds of Wetlands Horizontal Subsurface Built in Real Scale".

The company Wetlands Construídos is scheduled to hold a conference at the Federal University of Minas Gerais on 26 August 2015.

== Affiliations ==
- Inova UFMG: Business incubator
- DESA UFMG: Sanitary and Environmental engineering department at the Federal University of Minas Gerais
- ITUBANAIA: Landscape design company
- Clean Environment Brasil: Corporate group that manufactures and sells a line of environmental products, equipment and technologies in Brazil.
