= Vegetative treatment system =

A Vegetative Treatment System (VTS) is a combination of treatment steps for managing runoff. It treats runoff by settling, infiltrating, and nutrient usage. Individual components of a VTS include, a settling structure, an outlet structure, a distribution system, and a Vegetative Treatment Area (VTA). All these components when used together are considered to be a Vegetative Treatment System.

== Introduction ==
A Vegetative Treatment System (VTS) is a new alternative treatment option for treating the runoff from an animal feeding operation in an effort to protect water quality in South Dakota (SD). A VTS consists of a sediment basin to settle the solids from the feedlot, and uses controlled release of the liquids to a vegetated treatment area (VTA).

The VTA area is commonly confused with vegetative buffer (or filter) strips. A buffer strip is a narrow strip of vegetation (usually 30–60 feet wide) between cropland or a water source, such as a river, lake, or stream. In contrast, a VTA is a specifically sized area of perennial vegetation to which runoff from a barnyard or feedlot is applied uniformly. The VTA utilizes the water holding capacity of the soil to store the runoff water until the nutrients and water can be used by the vegetation. Therefore, the application of the runoff to the VTA must be at a rate to prevent deep percolation below the root zone, and not allow the flow to extend past the end of the VTA.

A VTS can be an economical alternative to runoff retention (holding) ponds for controlling runoff from an open lot feeding production system (feedlots). A Vegetative Treatment Area (VTA) is an area of perennial vegetation, such as a grass or a forage. The VTA is used to treat runoff from a feedlot or barnyard. It treats runoff by settling, infiltration, and nutrient use. Runoff passes through buffers with some “filtering” of pollutants, but no attempt is made to control solids or flow. A VTS, however, collects runoff from a barnyard or feedlot, separates the solids from the liquids, and uniformly distributes the liquid over the vegetated area. Little or no runoff should leave a VTA.

Runoff is first collected from an open lot or barnyard area in a sediment settling structure, usually a basin. Such basins are very effective for removing most solids. The runoff then flows into a VTA where the soil treats and stores the runoff. Once the runoff is in the soil, natural processes allow plants to use the nutrients. The general idea behind VTS technology is that the plants will take up the nutrients contained in the runoff and that natural processes will eliminate undesirable components such as pathogens. There are many different types of VTA’s such as level, infiltration basins, sloped, sprinkler, dual and multiple systems, etc.

A Vegetative Treatment System can be used to manage runoff from open lots of both AFOs and CAFOs. VTS systems for large CAFOs can be permitted under the National Pollutant Discharge Elimination System (NPDES) in the US.

== Advantages ==
- May provide lower initial investment and operating costs
- More aesthetically palatable than large ponds
- No long-term storage of runoff required, such as holding or evaporation ponds
- Fewer safety issues
- Land designated for VTA can produce usable forage

== Disadvantages ==
- A VTA may not be a “closed” system;
- Saturated soils from previous rains could allow a discharge
- Special management required during runoff events
- The VTAs can be damaged by a lack of maintenance and attention - gullies, erosion, and poor vegetation stands dramatically reduce their effectiveness
- Not currently permittable in SD by the Department of Environment and Natural Resources
- The VTAs may not provide the same level of water quality improvement as a total runoff containment system, such as holding or evaporation ponds provide
