= Lava filter =

Water treatment filter

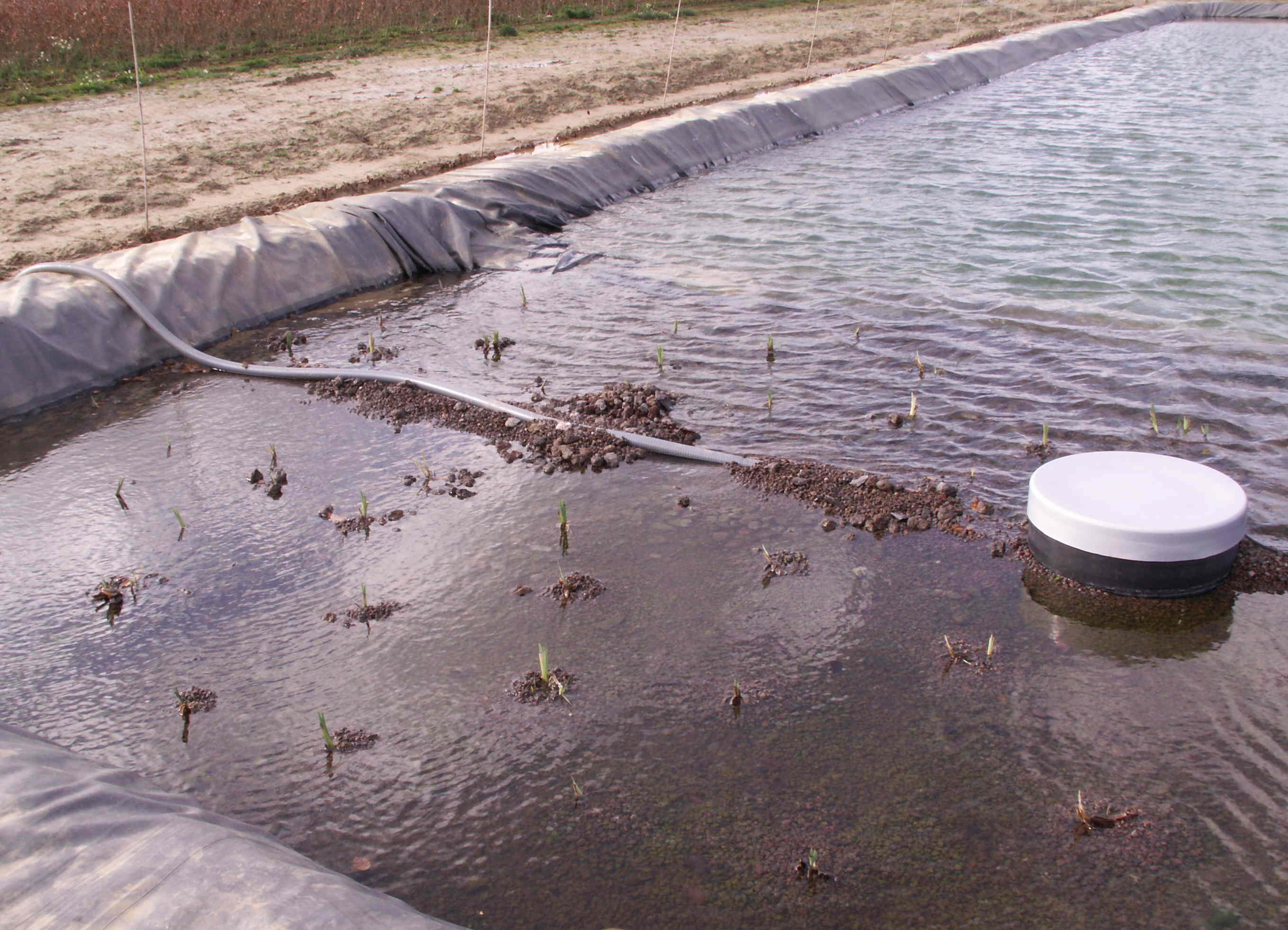
A constantly submerged lavafilter

A lava filter is a biological filter that uses lavastone pebbles as support material on which microorganisms can grow in a thin biofilm. This community of microorganisms, known as the periphyton, break down the odor components in the air, such as hydrogen sulfide. The biodegradation processes that occurs is provided by the bacteria themselves. In order for this to work, sufficient oxygen as well as water and nutrients (for cell growth) is to be supplied.

== Method ==
Contaminated air enters the system at the bottom of the filter and passes in an upward direction through the filter. Water is supplied through the surface of the biofilter and trickles down over the lava rock to the bottom, where it is collected. Constant water provisioning at the surface prevents dry-out of the active bacteria in the biofilm and ensures a constant pH value in the filter. It also functions to make nutrients available to the bacteria.

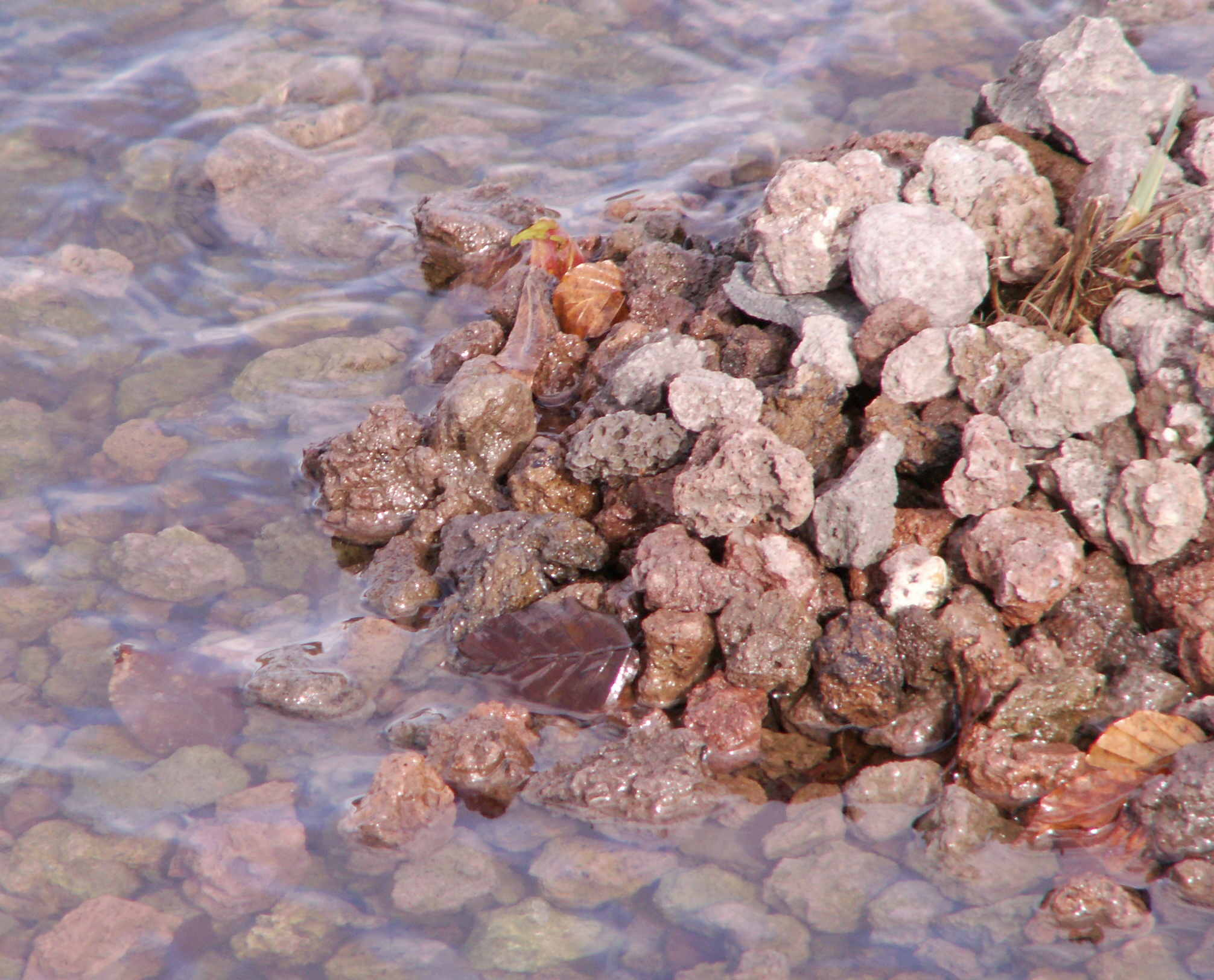
A pile of lavastones in a lavafilter

Percolating water collected at the filter bottom contains odour components as well as sulfuric acid from the biological oxidation of hydrogen sulfide. Depending on the process design the collected water is recirculated or subjected to further treatment.

== Types of systems ==
At present: 2 types of systems are used;

1. constantly submerged lava filters (for treatment ponds, combined treatment ponds/irrigation reservoirs, ...)
2. not-submerged lava filters (for wastewater treatment; wastewater is simply sprayed on the pebbles with this system)

=== Constantly submerged lavafilters ===
These are constructed out of 2 layers of lava pebbles and a top layer of nutrient-free soil (only at the plants roots). On top, water-purifying plants (as Iris pseudacorus and Sparganium erectum) are placed. Usually, around 1/4 of the dimension of lavastone is required to purify the water and just like slow sand filters, a series of herringbone drains are placed (with lava filters these are placed at the bottom layer).

The water-purifying plants used with constantly submerged, planted, lavafilters (e.g. treatment ponds, self-purifying irrigation reservoirs, ...) include a wide variety of plants, depending on the local climate and geographical location. Plants are usually chosen which are indigenous in that location for environmental reasons and optimum workings of the system. In addition to water-purifying (de-nutrifying) plants, plants that supply oxygen, and shade are also added in ecologic water catchments, ponds, ... This to allow a complete ecosystem to form. Finally, in addition to plants, locally grown bacteria and non-predatory fish are also added to eliminate pests. The bacteria are usually grown locally by submerging straw in water and allowing it to form bacteria (arriving from the surrounding atmosphere). The plants used (placed on an area 1/4 of the water mass) are divided in 4 separate water depth-zones; knowingly:

1. A water-depth zone from 0–20 cm; Iris pseudacorus, Sparganium erectum, ... may be placed here (temperate climates)
2. A water-depth zone from 40–60 cm; Stratiotes aloides, Hydrocharis morsus-ranae, ... may be placed here (temperate climates)
3. A water-depth zone from 60–120 cm; Nymphea alba, ... may be placed here (temperate climates)
4. A submerged water-depth zone; Myriophyllum spicatum, ... may be placed here (temperate climates)

Finally, three types of (non-predatory) fish (surface; bottom and ground-swimmers) are chosen. This of course to ensure that the fish may 'get along'. Examples of the three types of fish (for temperate climates) are:

- Surface swimming fish: Leuciscus leuciscus, Leuciscus idus, Scardinius erythrophthalmus
- Middle-swimmers: Rutilus rutilus
- Bottom-swimming fish: Tinca tinca

== See also ==
- Constructed wetland
- Treatment pond
- Organisms used in water purification
