= Pitín =

- Municipality
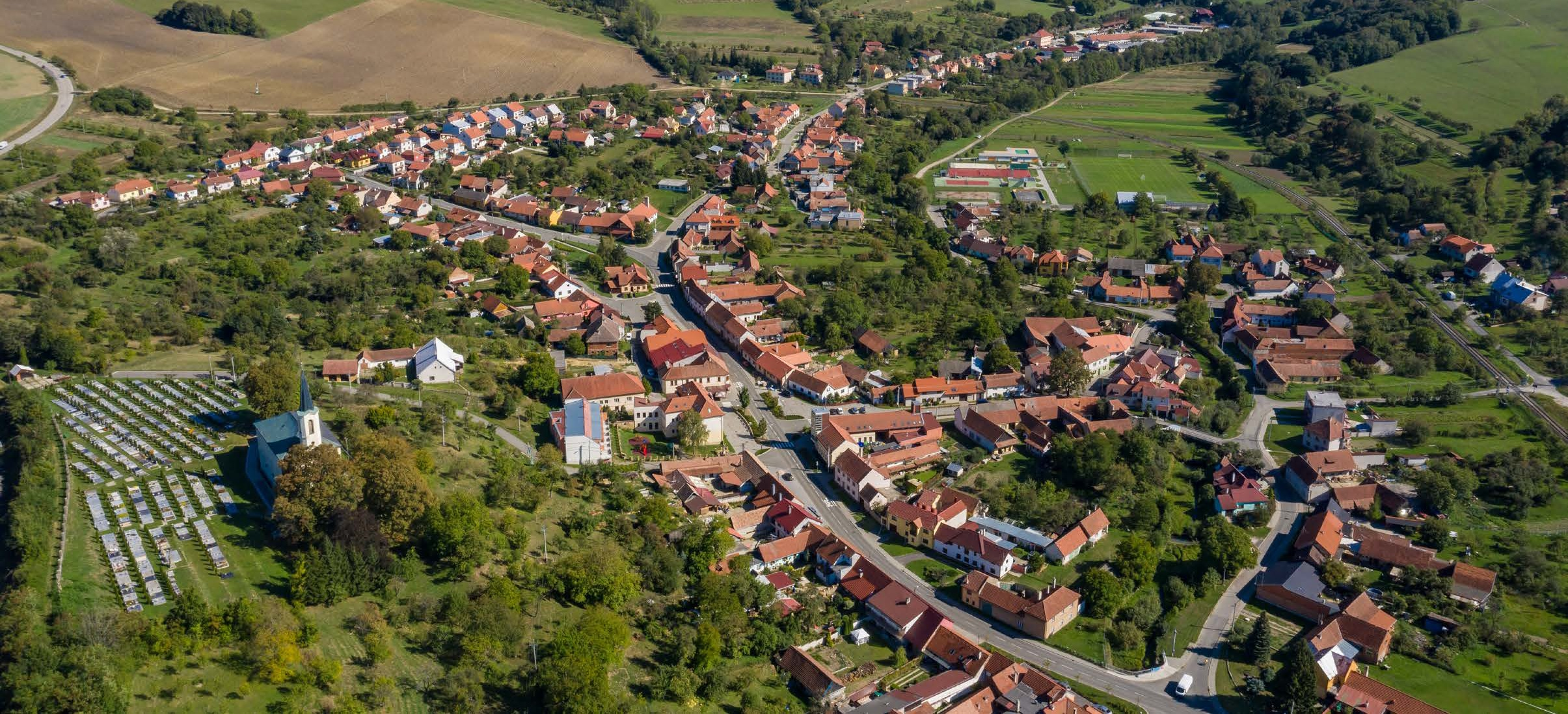
- Aerial view

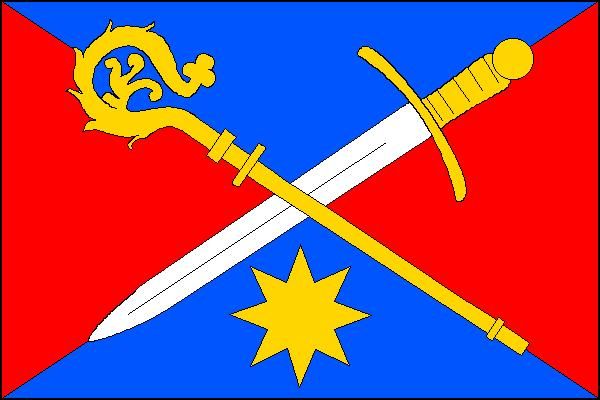
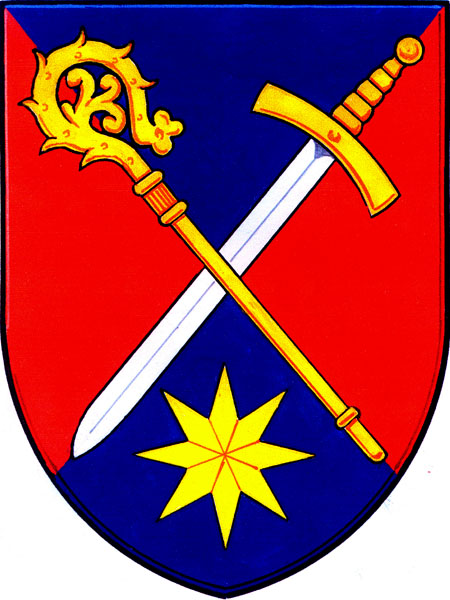
- Flag Coat of arms

- Location in the Czech Republic
- Coordinates: 49°2′18″N 17°51′2″E
- Country: Czech Republic
- Region: Zlín
- District: Uherské Hradiště
- First mentioned: 1405

Area
  - Total: 23.06 km^{2} (8.90 sq mi)
- Elevation: 324 m (1,063 ft)

Population (2026-01-01)
  - Total: 892
  - Density: 38.7/km^{2} (100/sq mi)
- Time zone: UTC+1 (CET)
  - Summer (DST): UTC+2 (CEST)
- Postal code: 687 71
- Website: www.pitin.cz

Pitín is a municipality and village in Uherské Hradiště District in the Zlín Region of the Czech Republic. It has about 900 inhabitants.

Pitín lies approximately 31 kilometres (19 mi) east of Uherské Hradiště, 28 km (17 mi) south-east of Zlín, and 276 km (171 mi) south-east of Prague.

== Demographics ==
Historical population
Year	Pop.	±%
1869	846	—
1880	914	+8.0%
1890	972	+6.3%
1900	979	+0.7%
1910	1,067	+9.0%
1921	1,215	+13.9%
1930	1,116	−8.1%
1950	1,119	+0.3%
1961	1,231	+10.0%
1970	1,183	−3.9%
1980	1,081	−8.6%
1991	911	−15.7%
2001	937	+2.9%
2011	910	−2.9%
2021	865	−4.9%
Source: Censuses

== Notable people ==
- Ondřej Kúdela (born 1987), footballer
