= Loyset =

Loyset is a given name. Notable people with the name include:

- Loyset Compère (c. 1445–1518), Franco-Flemish composer
- Loyset Liédet (1420–c. 1480), Dutch miniaturist and illuminator

== See also ==
- Loysel (surname)
