= Post (structural) =

Structural support

A post is a main vertical or leaning support in a structure similar to a column or pillar, the term post generally refers to a timber but may be metal or stone. A stud in wooden or metal building construction is similar but lighter duty than a post and a strut may be similar to a stud or act as a brace. In the U.K. a strut may be very similar to a post but not carry a beam. In wood construction posts normally land on a sill, but in rare types of buildings the post may continue through to the foundation called an interrupted sill or into the ground called earthfast, post in ground, or posthole construction. A post is also a fundamental element in a fence. The terms "jack" and "cripple" are used with shortened studs and rafters but not posts, except in the specialized vocabulary of shoring.

== Timber framing ==
Timber framing is a general term for building with wooden posts and beams. The term post is the namesake of other general names for timber framing such as post-and-beam, post-and-girt construction and more specific types of timber framing such as Post and lintel, post-frame, post in ground, and ridge-post construction. In roof construction such as king post, queen post, and crown post framing. A round post is often called a pole or mast depending on its diameter thus pole building framing, or a mast church.

=== Post and strut names in traditional timber framing ===
- Wall – A general term for a post in a wall.
- Principal – A primary support. Principal is a general term meaning a "major" member often distinguished from "common" or "minor" members.
- Angle – A historical name for a corner post.
- Intermediate – A post in an exterior wall not at a corner.
- Chimney – An intermediate post receiving its name from being near a chimney.
- Interior – A general term for posts not in an exterior wall.
- Arcade – A post located between an aisle and nave.
- Aisle – same as arcade post.
- Corner – Any post at the corner of a building.
- Story – A post only one story tall as in "storeyed construction" also known as platform framing.
- Prick – 1) Same as story post, a one-story post for extra support at a particular location; 2) In a roof truss a side post.
- Ridge – A post extending from the ground or foundation to the ridge beam.
- Samson – similar to a prick post or puncheon.
- Puncheon: 1) A short, stout post may be identical to a prick post; 2) Puncheon may also mean a split log or heavy slab of timber with the face smoothed, used for flooring or construction.
- Dragon – (rare) A corner post supporting a dragon beam in jetty framing.
- Gunstock, jowled, flared, teasel (rare) – A flared post, larger at the top than the bottom, most commonly found in the side walls but could be any location. Rarely a post may have an "integral bracket" which is a mid-post flair to carry a lower timber. The portion of a flared post extending upward at the top is called the upstand and one of the top tenons is called a teazle (teasel) tenon.
- Jetty – A post supporting a jetty
- Door – A post framing a doorway.
- Blade – A specific name for the post-like timber in cruck framing.
- Cruck stud – The upright stud or post forming a wall, mounted on a cruck blade and held by a cruck spur.
- Pile, piling – A post driven or set into the ground such as in earthfast, post in ground, or "posthole construction".
- Stave – 1) Small, narrow pieces of wood used in a variety of ways; 2) Upright planks carrying a wall.; 3) Posts carrying a wall.

=== Post and strut names in roof framing ===
- King – 1) (U.S.) A single, central post in a roof truss in tension between the rafters (top chords) and a tie beam (bottom chord), or 2) (U.S.) A short of the tie beam only supporting the rafters via struts. 3) (U.K.) A king post specifically carries a ridge beam otherwise is called a king strut. "King post" was formerly used to describe a crown post in the U. K., but no longer.
- King pendant: A central, upright timber in a truss projecting below the lowest beam, "normally used with scissor beams".
- Queen – 1) A pair of vertical posts in a roof system that are part of a truss, with a straining beam between and in tension holding up a tie beam or; 2) Two posts in a roof system not acting as a truss in the engineering sense and here in compression. Also called a queen strut.
- Queen strut: 1)(U.K.) A queen post which does not carry a plate.; 2)(U.S.) A queen post not part of a truss in the engineering sense and in compression (a more modern definition than 2)in Queen Post above).
- Lateral Queen – a pair of braced posts between a tie beam and collar beam.
- Prince – A strut associated with a king post truss.
- princess – A strut associated with a queen strut but shorter.
- Crown – A post on a tie beam or collar beam carrying a crown plate.
- Crown strut: A piece similar to a crown post but not carrying a plate.
- Ashlar – or ashlar piece: Short post from a tie beam to a rafter near a masonry wall.
- Purlin – A post supporting a purlin plate, may be plumb or leaning (canted).
- Hammer – An upright in a hammer beam truss supported on the hammer beam in a hammerbeam roof.
- Ridge – A historic type of post and lintel framing, the ridge post carrying a supporting ridge beam. See Ständerhaus#Firstständerhaus

== Gallery ==
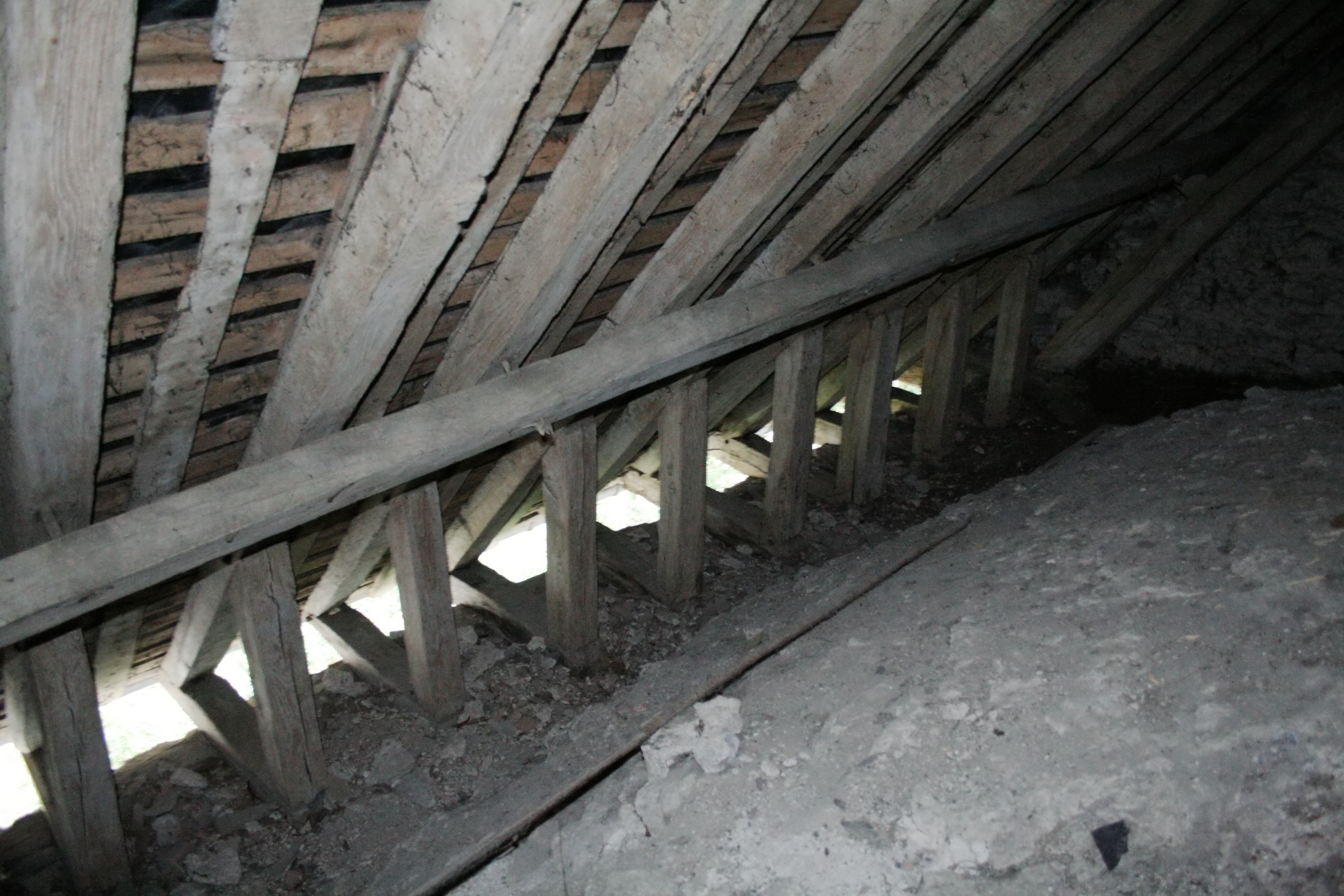
Ashlar pieces are the short, vertical posts. Saint-André-d'Hébertot, France

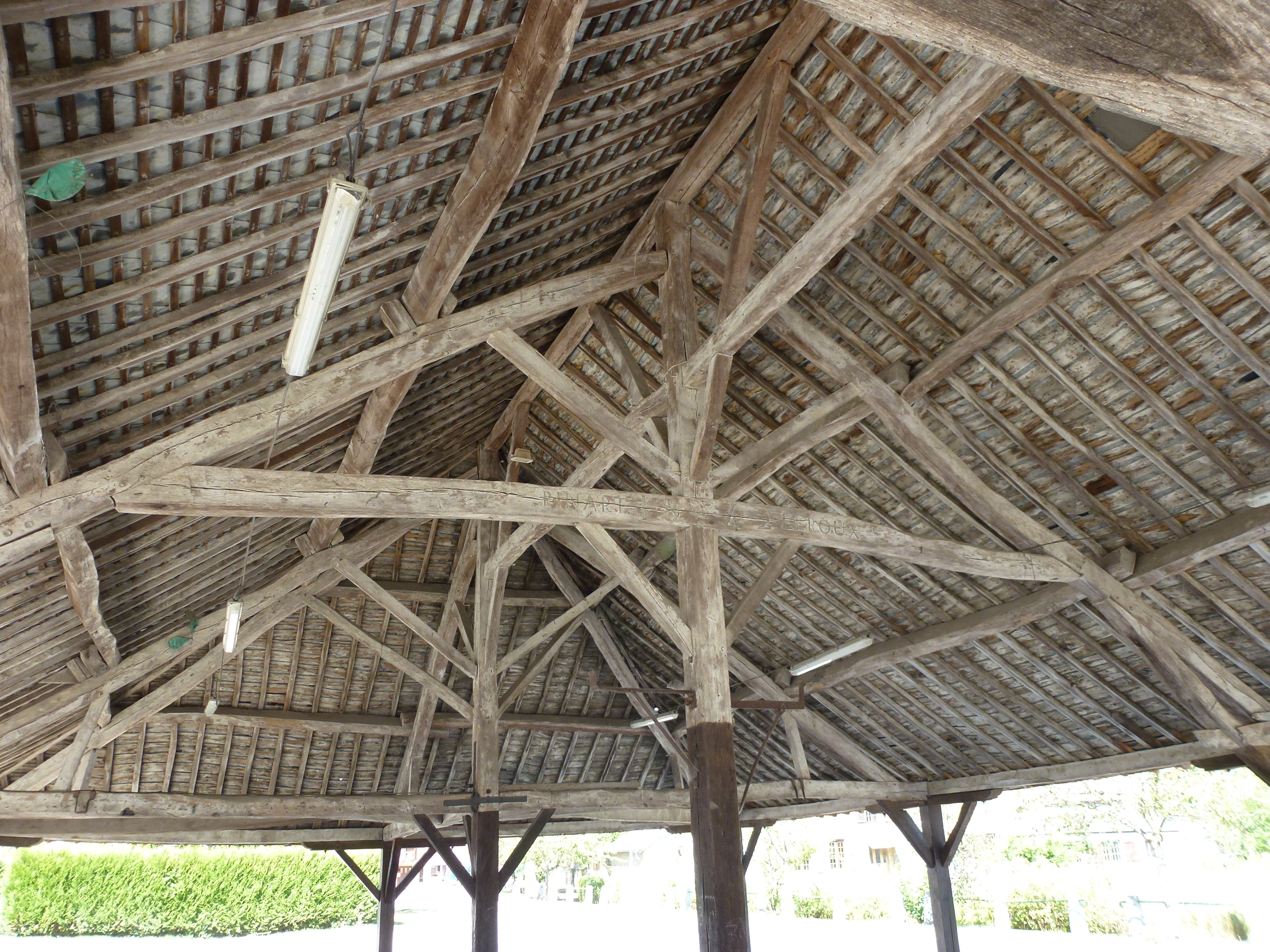
Ridge posts extend to the ridge beams. Ridge post framing is a type of post and lintel framing from ancient times. A market hall in Chesnois-Auboncourt, Ardennes, France.

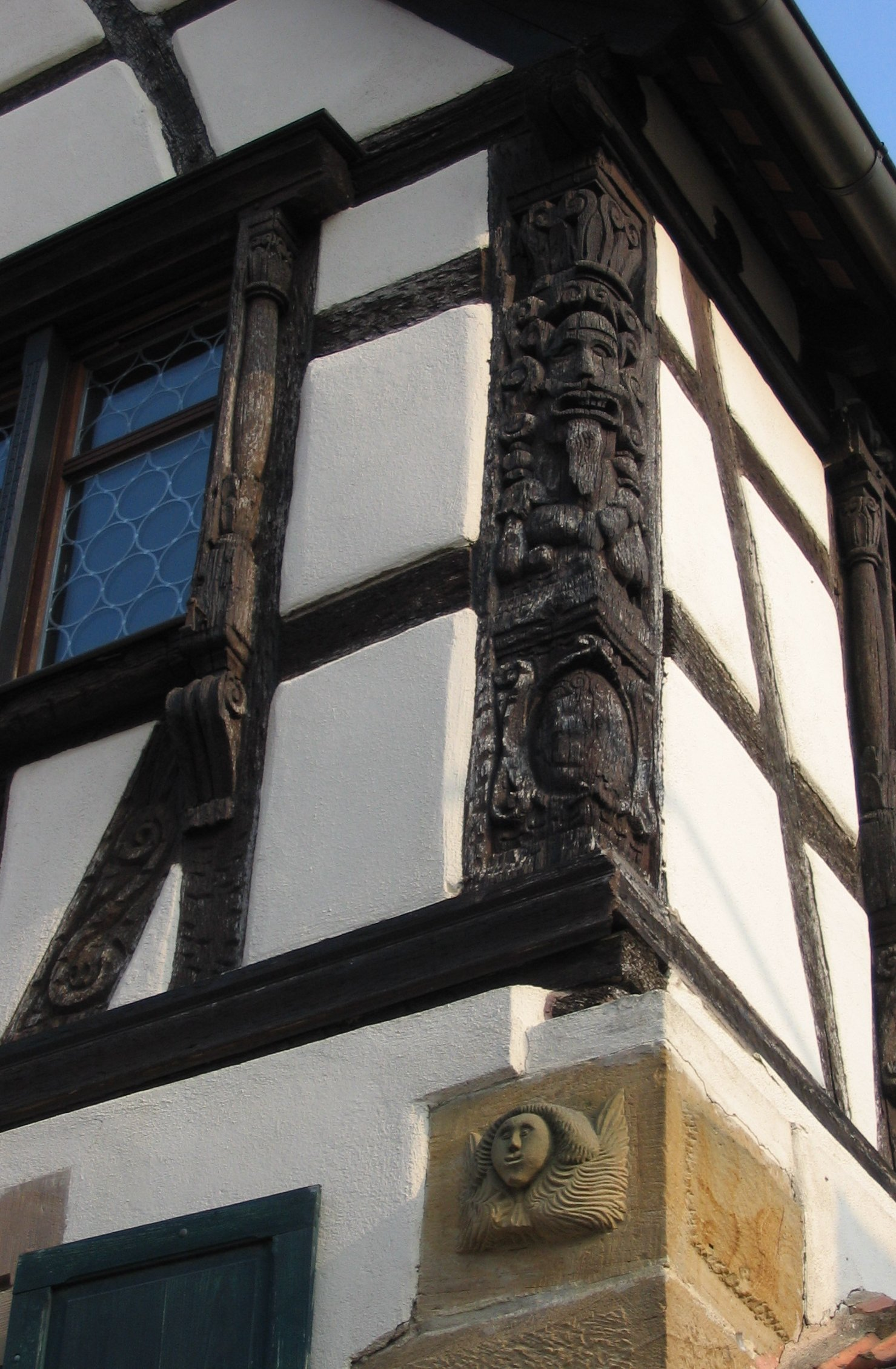
This corner post in a half-timbered (colombage) building is decoratively carved. Soultz-les-Bains, France.

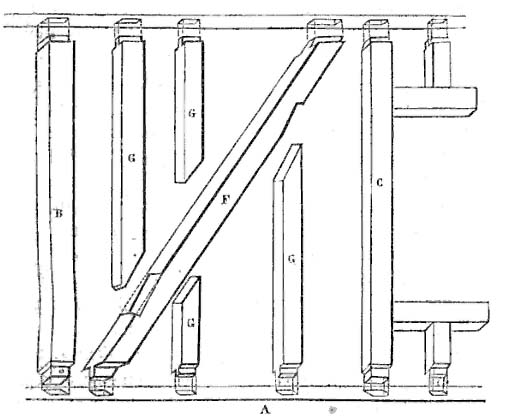
B is an intermediate post, C is a window post G are studs which are interrupted by a brace (F) in a timber framed wall.

== See also ==
- Column
- Framing (construction) which details each of
  - Balloon framing
  - Platform framing
- Walls
- Newel post: A non-structural upright which supports a stairway handrail.
