= Loysel (surname) =

Loysel is a French surname. Notable people with the surname include:

- Antoine Loysel (1536–1617), French jurist
- Edward Loysel (1818–1865), engineer and coiner of the term "percolation"
- Jean Loysel (1889–1962), French composer and lyricist

== See also ==
- Loiselle (surname) – pronounced the same
