= Pole building framing =

Construction method

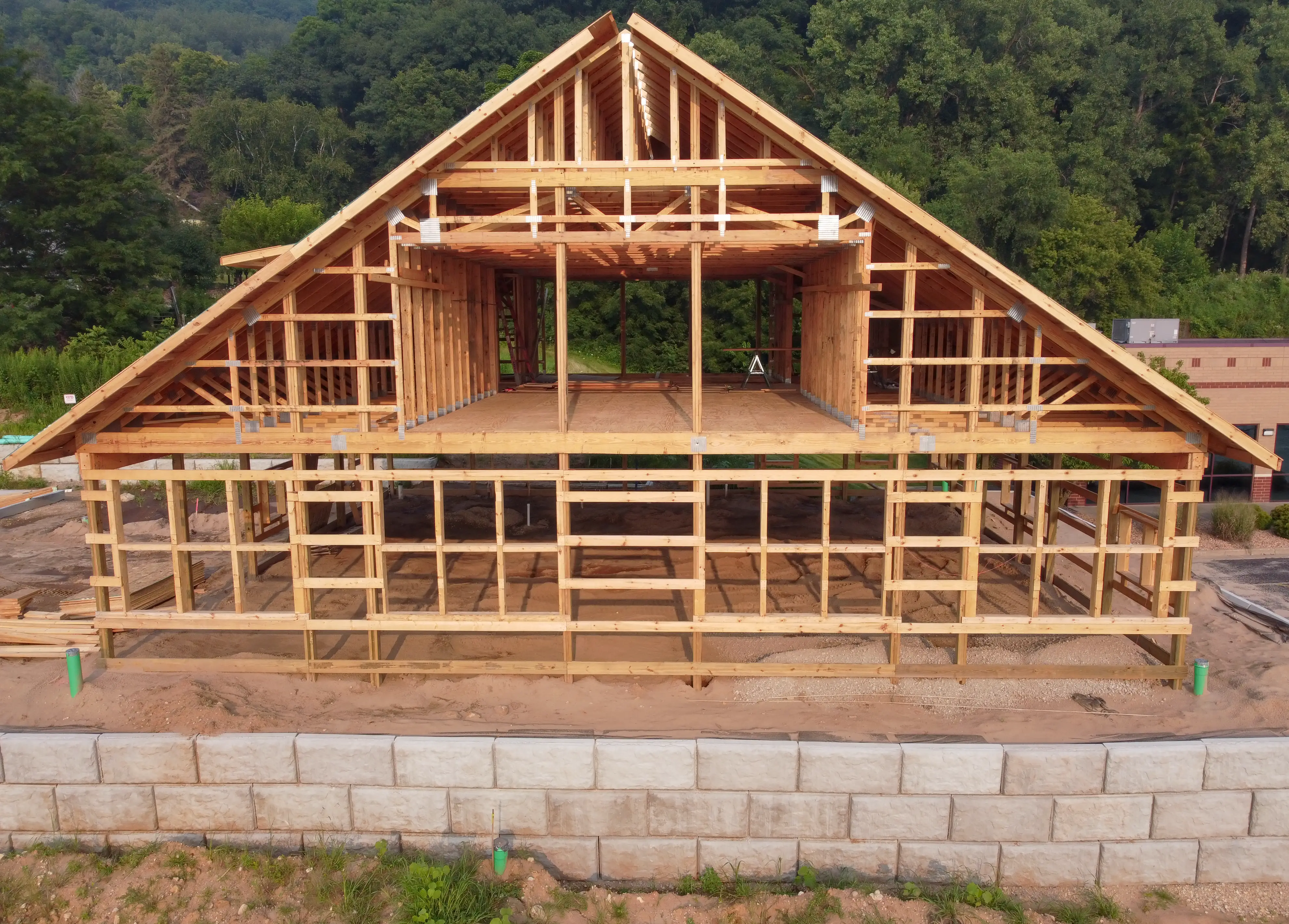
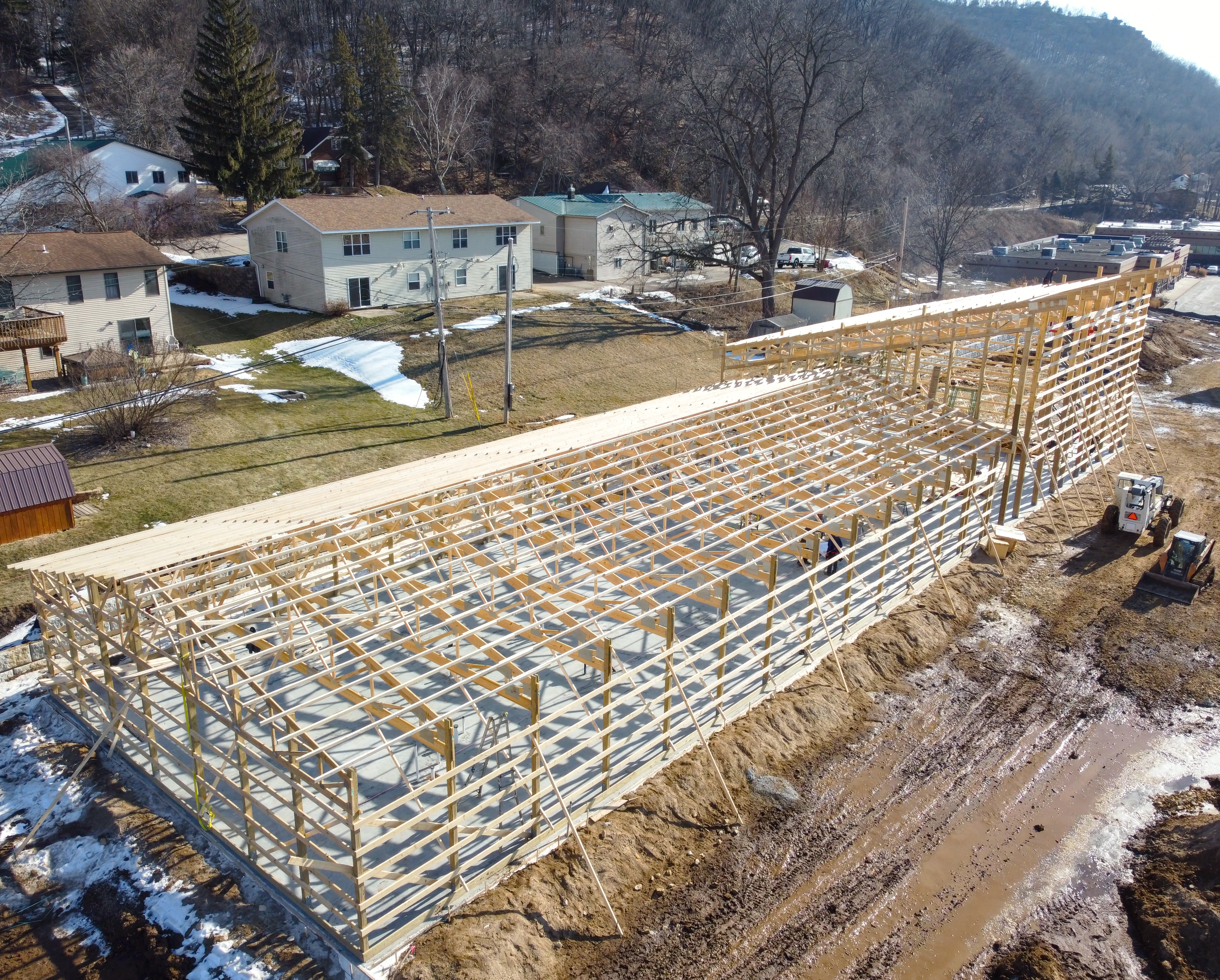
Post–frame buildings

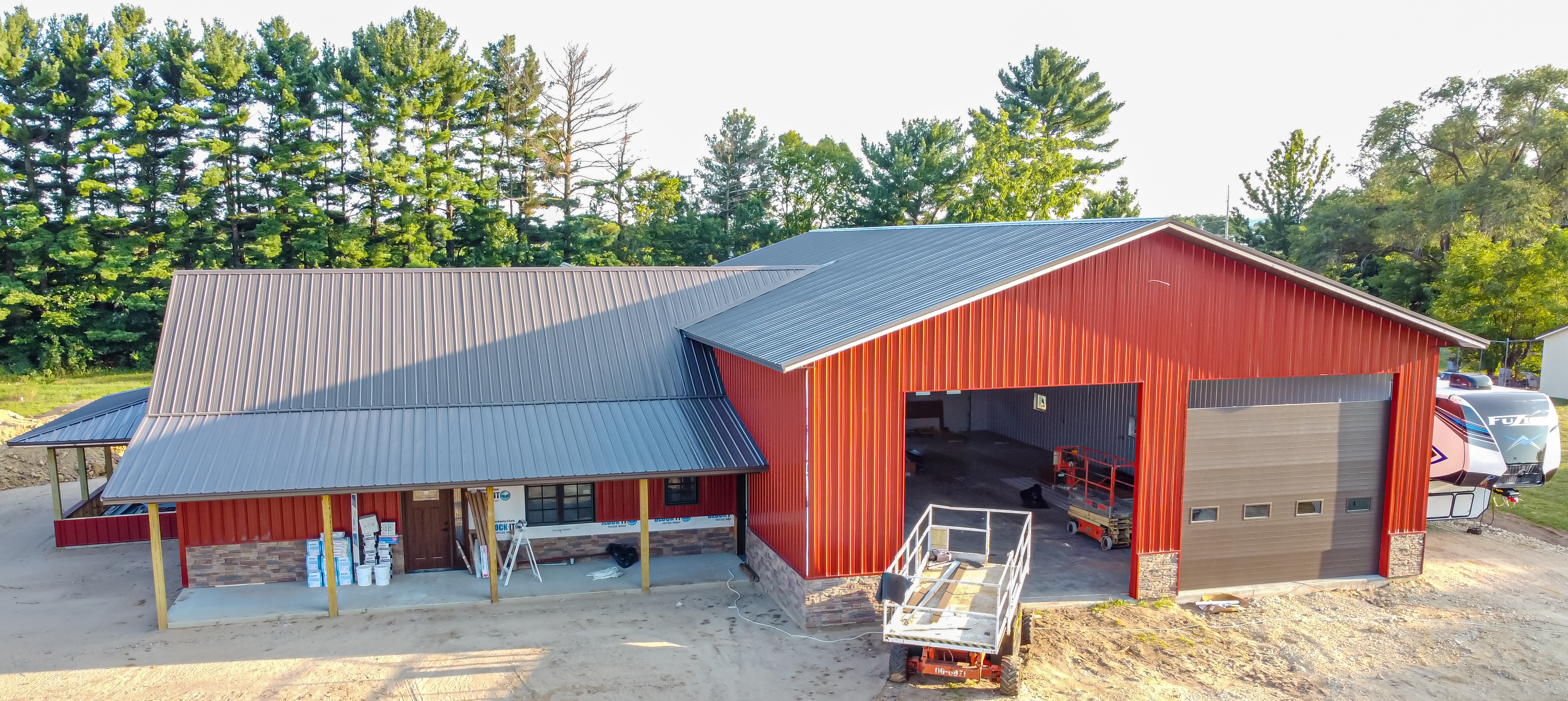
Post frame barndominium with corrugated metal roof

Pole framing, pole building framing, or post-frame construction is a simplified building technique that is an alternative to the labor-intensive traditional timber framing technique. It uses large poles or posts to provide the vertical structural support, along with girts to provide the horizontal support.

The posts are secured in a variety of ways. They can be buried directly in the ground, embedded in concrete footings, attached to metal brackets or precast concrete piers set in the ground, or attached with wet-set anchors to a continuous poured concrete foundation. The structures thus built are sometimes called pole barns or pole buildings.

The method was developed and matured during the 1930s as agricultural practices changed, including the shift toward engine-powered farm equipment and the demand for cheaper, larger barns and storage areas.

== History ==
Pole building design was pioneered in the 1930s in the United States originally using utility poles for horse barns and agricultural buildings. The depressed value of agricultural products in the 1920s, and 1930s and the emergence of large, corporate farming in the 1930s, created a demand for larger, cheaper agricultural buildings. As the practice took hold, rather than using utility poles, materials such as pole barn nails were developed specifically for this type of construction, making the process more affordable and reliable. Today, almost any low-rise structure can be quickly built using the post-frame construction method.

Pole barn construction was a quick and economical method of adding outbuildings on a farm as agriculture shifted to equipment-dependent and capital-intensive agriculture—necessitating shelter for tractors, harvesters, wagons and the like in much greater quantities and sizes. Around North America, many pole-built structures are still readily seen in rural and industrial areas.

== Construction ==
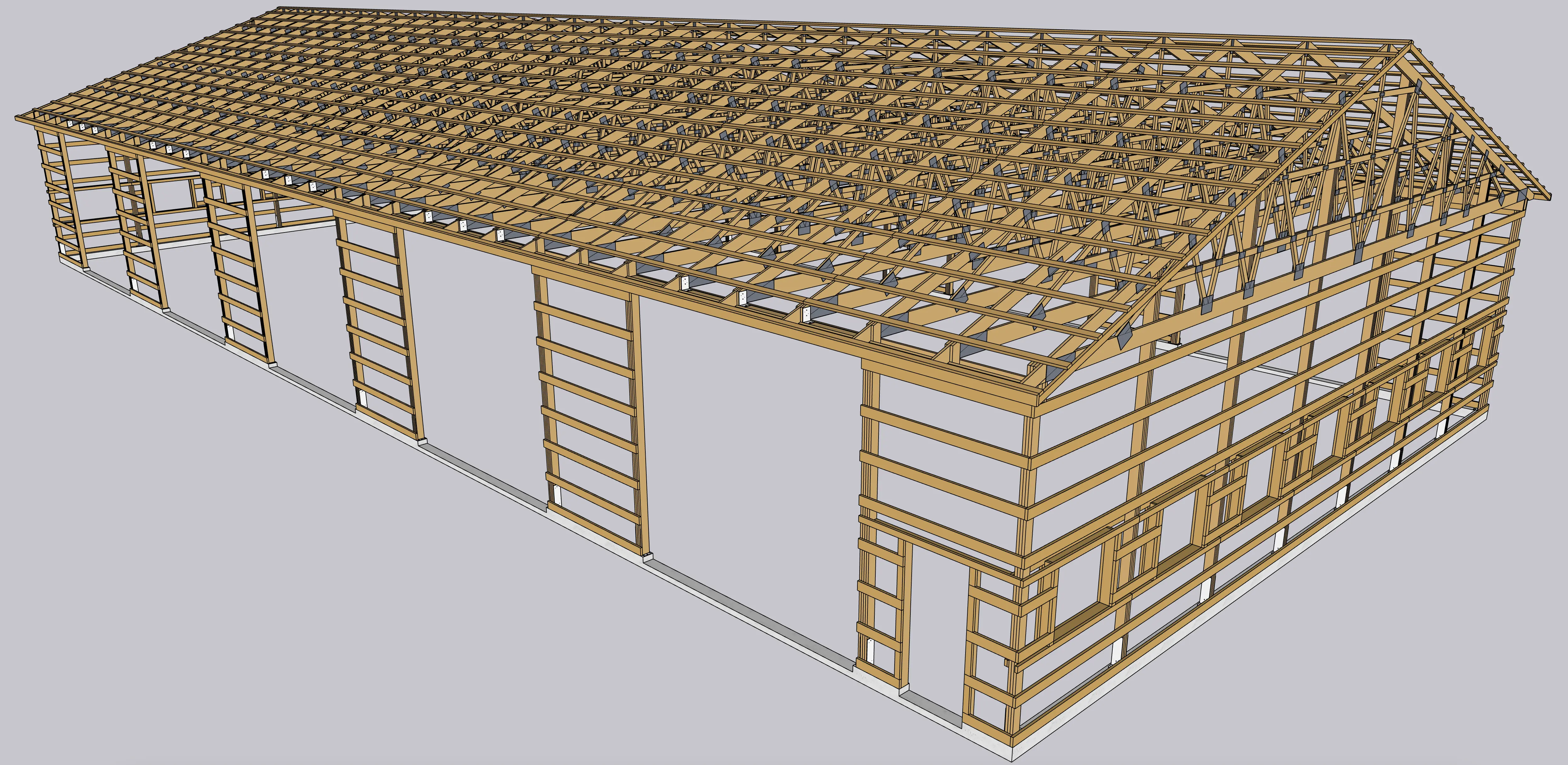
Post frame framing

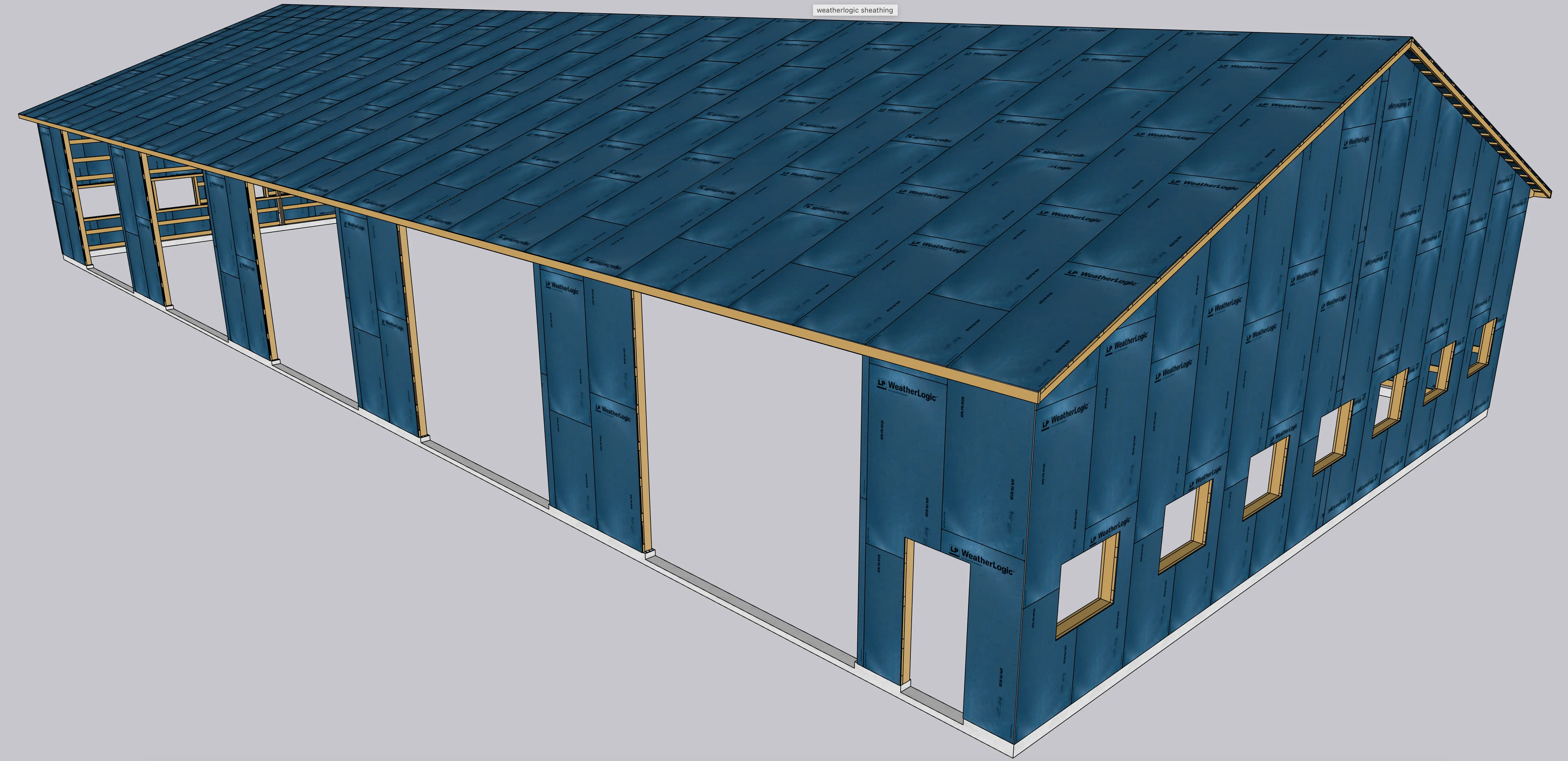
Post frame sheathing runs vertically compared to horizontally on stick framing

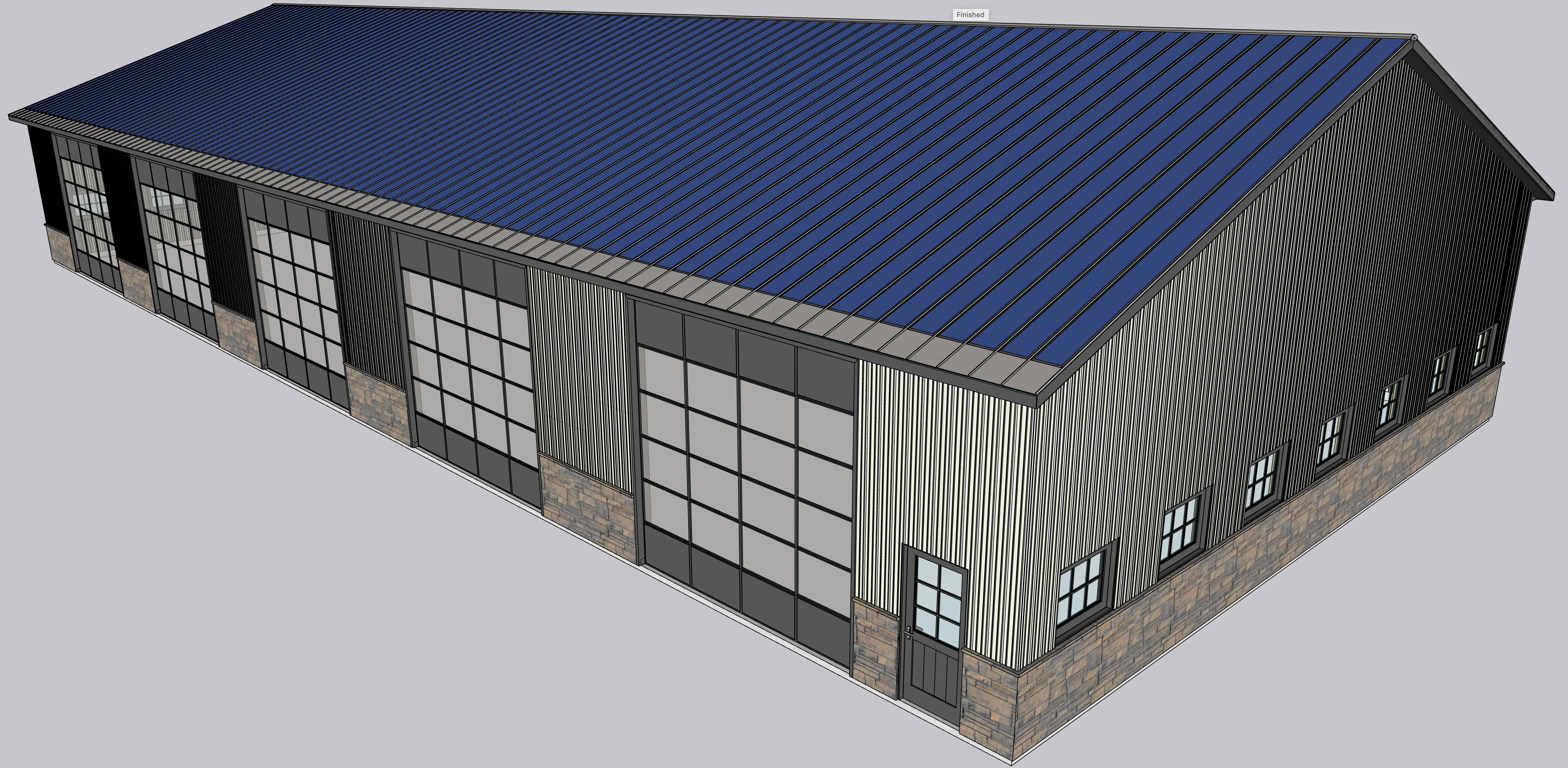
Post frame with thin film solar on standing seam metal roof

Poles, from which these buildings get their name, are natural shaped or round wooden timbers 4 to 12 inches (100 to 300 mm) in diameter. The structural frame of a pole building is made of tree trunks, utility poles, engineered lumber or chemically pressure-treated squared timbers which may be buried in the ground or anchored to a concrete slab. Generally the posts are evenly spaced 8 to 12 feet (2.4 to 3.7 m) apart except to allow for doors. Buried posts have the benefit of providing lateral stability so no braces are needed. Buried posts may be driven into the ground or set in holes then filled with soil, crushed stone, or concrete.

Pole buildings do not require walls but may be open shelters, such as for farm animals or equipment or for use as picnic shelters.

Enclosed pole buildings have exterior curtain walls formed by girts fastened to the exterior of the posts at intervals about 2 feet (0.61 m) on center that carry the siding and any interior load. The walls may be designed as a shear wall to provide structural stability. Other girt systems include framing in between the posts rather than on the outer side of the posts. Siding materials for a pole building are most commonly rolled-rib 29-gauge enameled steel cut to length in 32-or-36-inch (813 or 914 mm) widths attached using color-matched screws with rubber washers to seal the holes. However, any standard siding can be used, including T1-11, vinyl, lap siding, cedar and even brick. Using sidings other than metal may require first installing sheathing, such as plywood, oriented strand board or boards.

On two walls, usually the long walls, the dimensional lumber girts at the top of the walls are doubled, one on the inside and one on the outside of the posts, and usually through-bolted with large carriage bolts to support the roof load. The roof structure is frequently a truss roof supporting purlins or laths, or built using common rafters. Wide buildings with common rafters need interior rows of posts. Sometimes rafters may be attached directly to the poles. The roof pitch of pole buildings is usually low and the roof form is usually gable or lean-to. Metal roofing is commonly used as the roofing and siding material on pole buildings.

The floor may be soil, gravel, concrete slab, or framed of wood.

== Modern developments ==
In modern developments the pole barns of the 1930s have become pole buildings for use as housing, commercial use, churches, picnic shelters or storage buildings. In the process more often than not, the poles have become posts of squared-off, pressure-treated timbers. These structures have the potential to replicate the functionality of other buildings, but they may be more affordable and require less time to construct. The most common use for pole buildings is storage buildings as it was on the farms, but today they may be for the storage of automobiles, boats, and RVs along with many other household items that would normally be found in a residential garage, or commercially as the surroundings for a light industry or small corporate offices with attached shops.

=== Gallery of modern uses ===
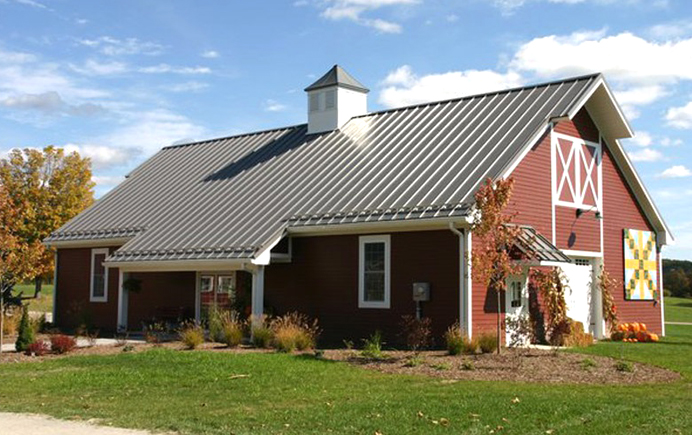
Post-frame construction building

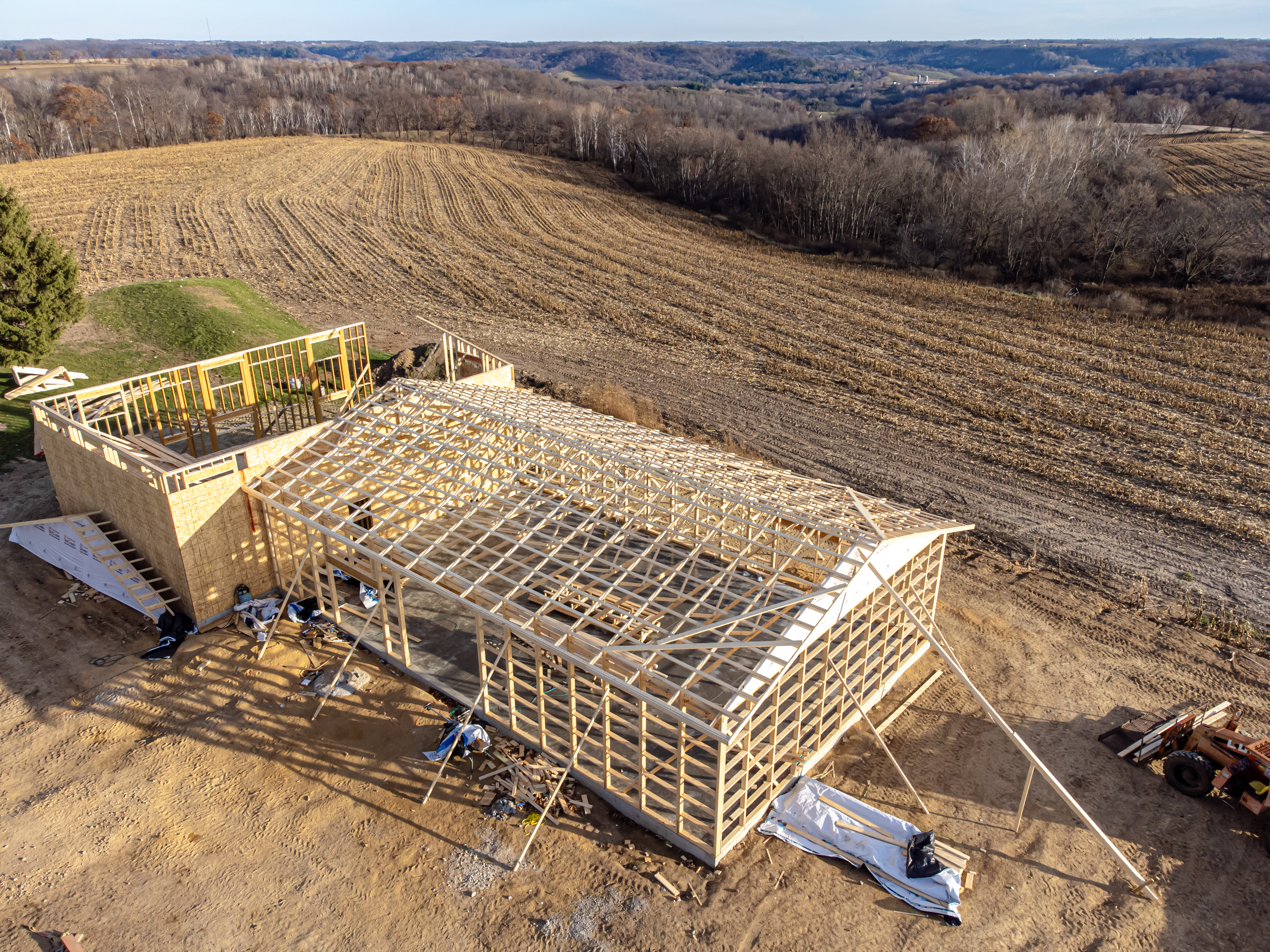
Post frame garage connected to traditional frame house

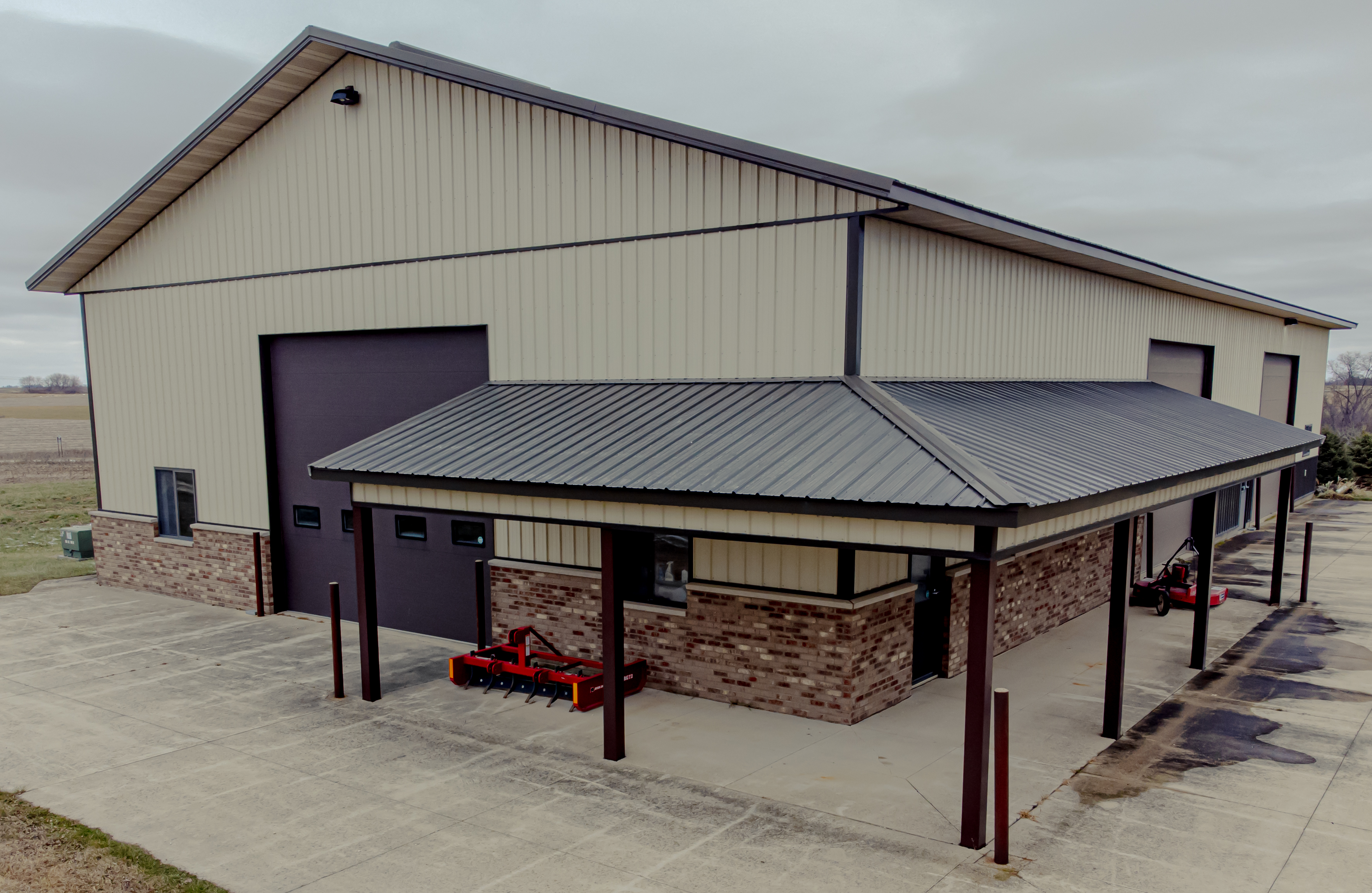
Post-frame shop

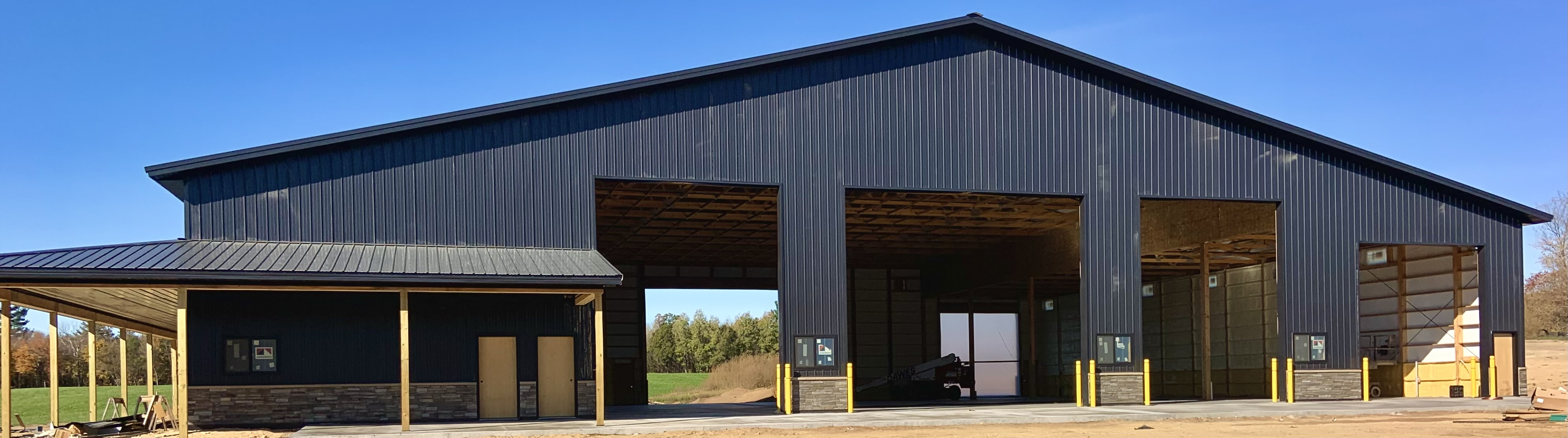
Post-frame building under construction

== See also ==
- Barndominium
- Shed
- Metal building
- Self-framing metal buildings
