= Camphoric acid =

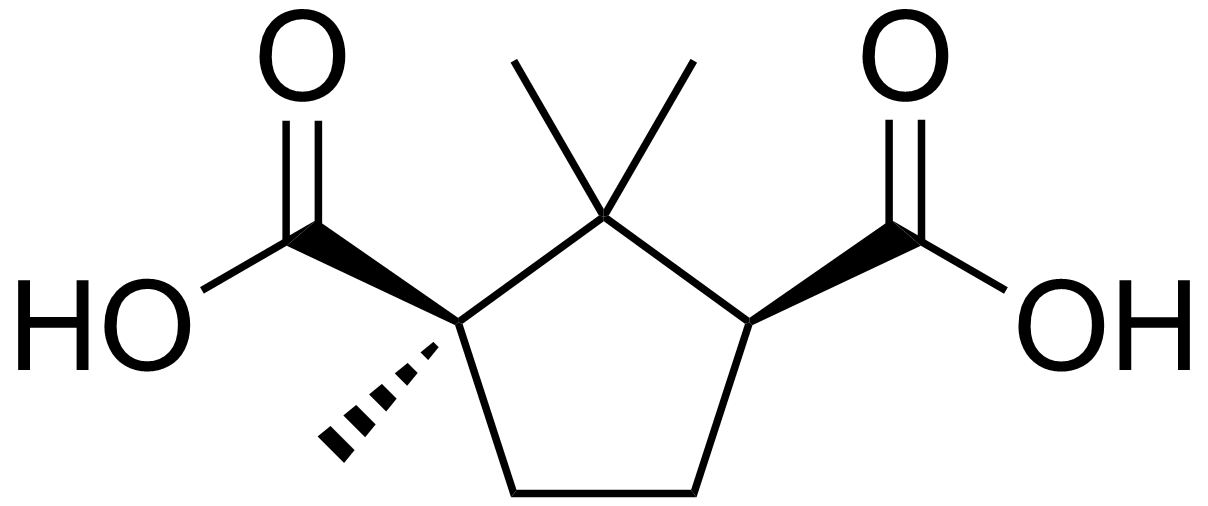

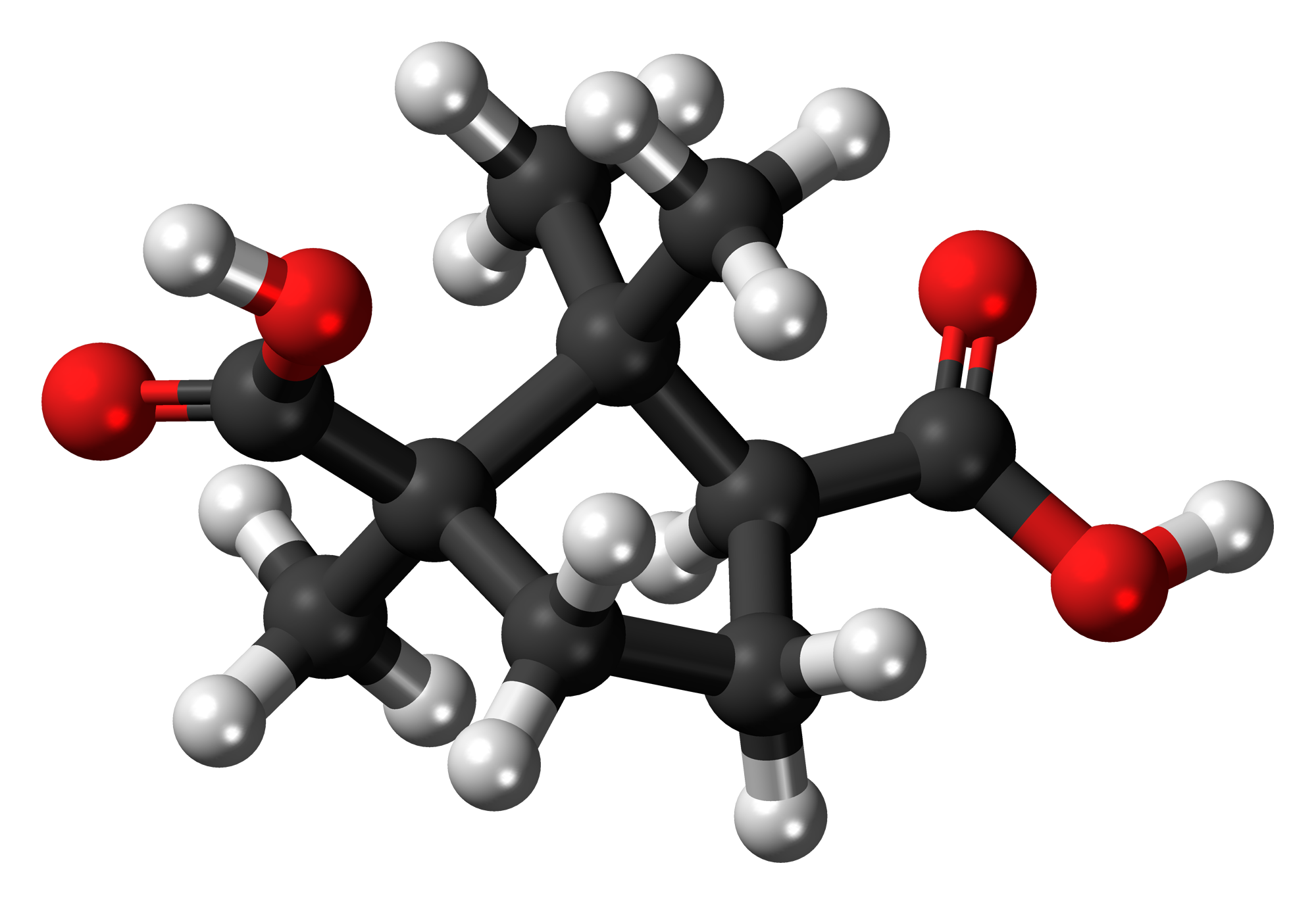

Names
- IUPAC name (1R,3S)-1,2,2-trimethylcyclopentane-1,3-dicarboxylic acid

Identifiers
CAS Number	560-09-8 (1S,3R); 124-83-4 (+) i.e., (1R,3S) D-Camphoric acid
3D model (JSmol)	Interactive image; Interactive image
ChEMBL	ChEMBL1205405
ChemSpider	20198
ECHA InfoCard	100.241.243
EC Number	811-021-7
PubChem CID	21491
UNII	62F72U898F (1S,3R); W77RM1CSD5 (+) i.e., (1R,3S) D-Camphoric acid
CompTox Dashboard (EPA)	DTXSID60870483 DTXSID80204569, DTXSID60870483
- InChI: InChI=1S/C10H16O4/c1-9(2)6(7(11)12)4-5-10(9,3)8(13)14/h6H,4-5H2,1-3H3,(H,11,12)(H,13,14) Key: LSPHULWDVZXLIL-UHFFFAOYSA-N; InChI=1/C10H16O4/c1-9(2)6(7(11)12)4-5-10(9,3)8(13)14/h6H,4-5H2,1-3H3,(H,11,12)(H,13,14)/t6-,10+/m0/s1 Key: LSPHULWDVZXLIL-QUBYGPBYBH; InChI=1/C10H16O4/c1-9(2)6(7(11)12)4-5-10(9,3)8(13)14/h6H,4-5H2,1-3H3,(H,11,12)(H,13,14) Key: LSPHULWDVZXLIL-UHFFFAOYAD
- SMILES: O=C(O)[C@]1(CC[C@@H](C(=O)O)C1(C)C)C; O=C(O)C1CCC(C(=O)O)(C)C1(C)C

Properties
Chemical formula	C_{10}H_{16}O_{4}
Molar mass	200.234 g·mol^{−1}
Density	1.21 g/cm^{3}
Melting point	183 to 187 °C (361 to 369 °F; 456 to 460 K)
Magnetic susceptibility (χ)	−129.0·10^{−6} cm^{3}/mol
- Except where otherwise noted, data are given for materials in their standard state (at 25 °C [77 °F], 100 kPa). verify (what is ?) Infobox references

Camphoric acid, C_{10}H_{16}O_{4} or in Latin form Acidum camphoricum, is a white crystallisable substance obtained from the oxidation of camphor. It exists in three optically different forms; the dextrorotatory one is obtained by the oxidation of dextrorotatory camphor and is used in pharmaceuticals.

== History ==
Acidum camphoricum was studied and isolated for the first time by French pharmacist Nicolas Vauquelin in the early 19th century, but it wasn't until September 1874 that Dutch chemist Jacobus H. van 't Hoff proposed the first suggestion for its molecular structure and optical properties. Haller and Blanc synthesized camphor from camphoric acid. In 1904, Finnish chemist Gustav Komppa became the first to succeed in manufacturing synthetic camphoric acid from diethyl oxalate and 3,3-dimethylpentanoic acid, and thus proving the structure of camphor.

== Chemical properties and isolation ==
Camphoric acid may be prepared by oxidising camphor with nitric acid.
