= Edward Loysel =

Engineer of early espresso machines

Edward Loysel (Vannes, 1816 – 1865), born Édouard Loysel de La Lantais, was a French-British engineer who patented an early espresso machine, and is known for having coined and popularised the terms "percolator" and "percolation."

Initially professor of mechanics and natural sciences in Marseille, France, he began to move into business in following years. In the early 1840s, he first patented an advertising panel and a chess game.

Later on, Loysel built over existing work undertaken by Jöns Jacob Berzelius in Sweden, the Count of Real and Pierre-François-Guillaume Boullay in France, and other techniques developed in Germany, to patent in 1845 his "Hydrostatic percolator" described as "devices, intended to obtain, by infusion, liquid extracts and various substances".

Mainly used for coffee, the machine was exhibited at the 1855 Paris Exposition. As Loysel had moved to the UK in 1844 (and obtained British nationality in 1848), his machine was presented as part of the "English catalogue" of the world fair. In London, he was member of the Institution of Civil Engineers.

The success of Loysel's machine was also ensured by its capacity to produce hundreds of cups of coffee per hour.
