= Loiselle (surname) =

Loiselle is a French surname. The name has been anglicized as Wisell in the United States. Notable people with the surname include:

- Bernard Loiselle (b. 1948), Canadian federal lawyer and politician
- Bette A. Loiselle (b. 1957), American ornithologist and ecologist
- Claude Loiselle (b. 1963), Canadian ice hockey player
- Gérard Loiselle (1921–1994), Canadian politician from Quebec
- Gilles Loiselle (1929–2022), Canadian administrator, diplomat, civil servant, journalist, and politician
- Hélène Loiselle (1928–2013), Canadian actress
- Nicole Loiselle (b. 1954), Canadian politician from Quebec

== See also ==
- Jean-Louis-Auguste Loiseleur-Deslongchamps botanist whose standard author abbreviation is Loisel
- Loysel (surname) – pronounced the same
