= Barndominium =

Barn-like structure with sheet metal siding

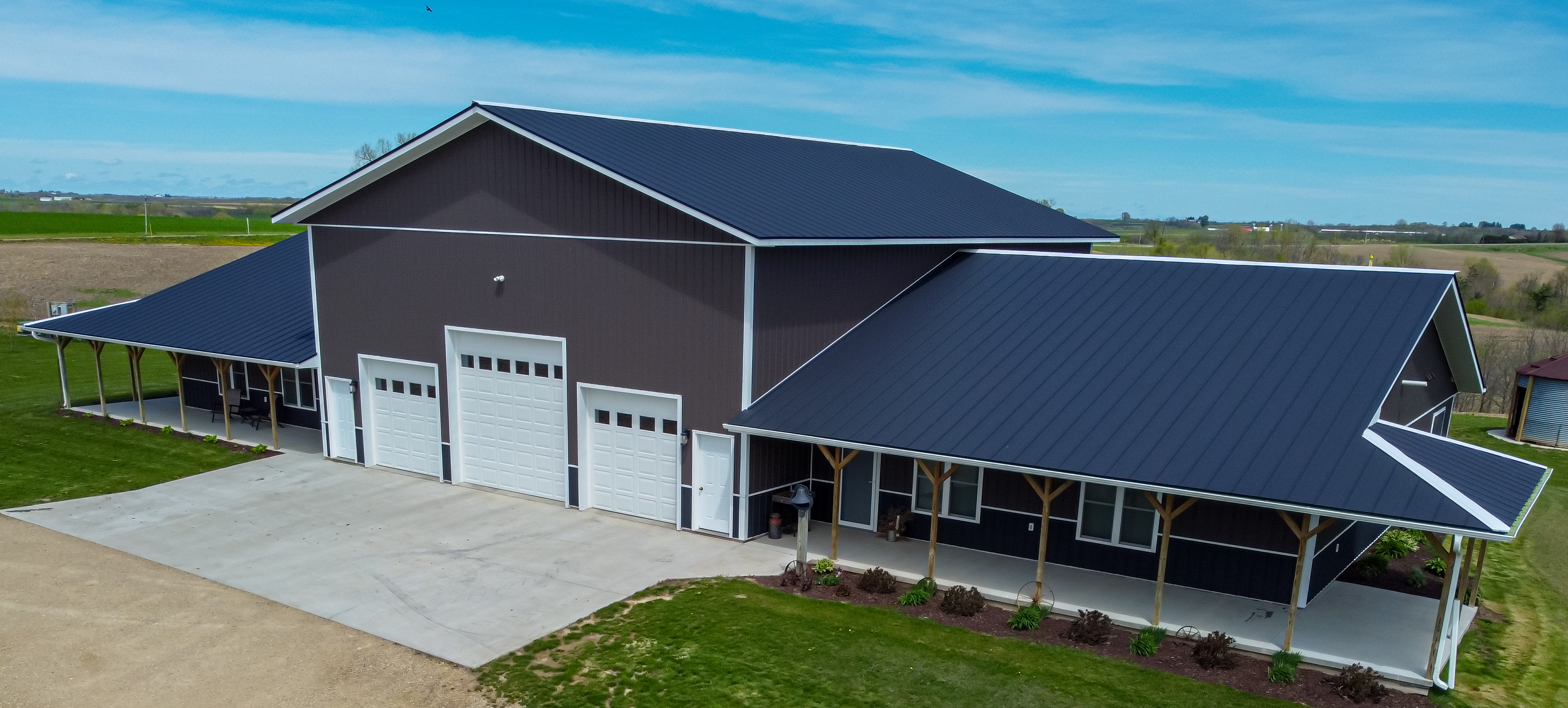
Barndominium

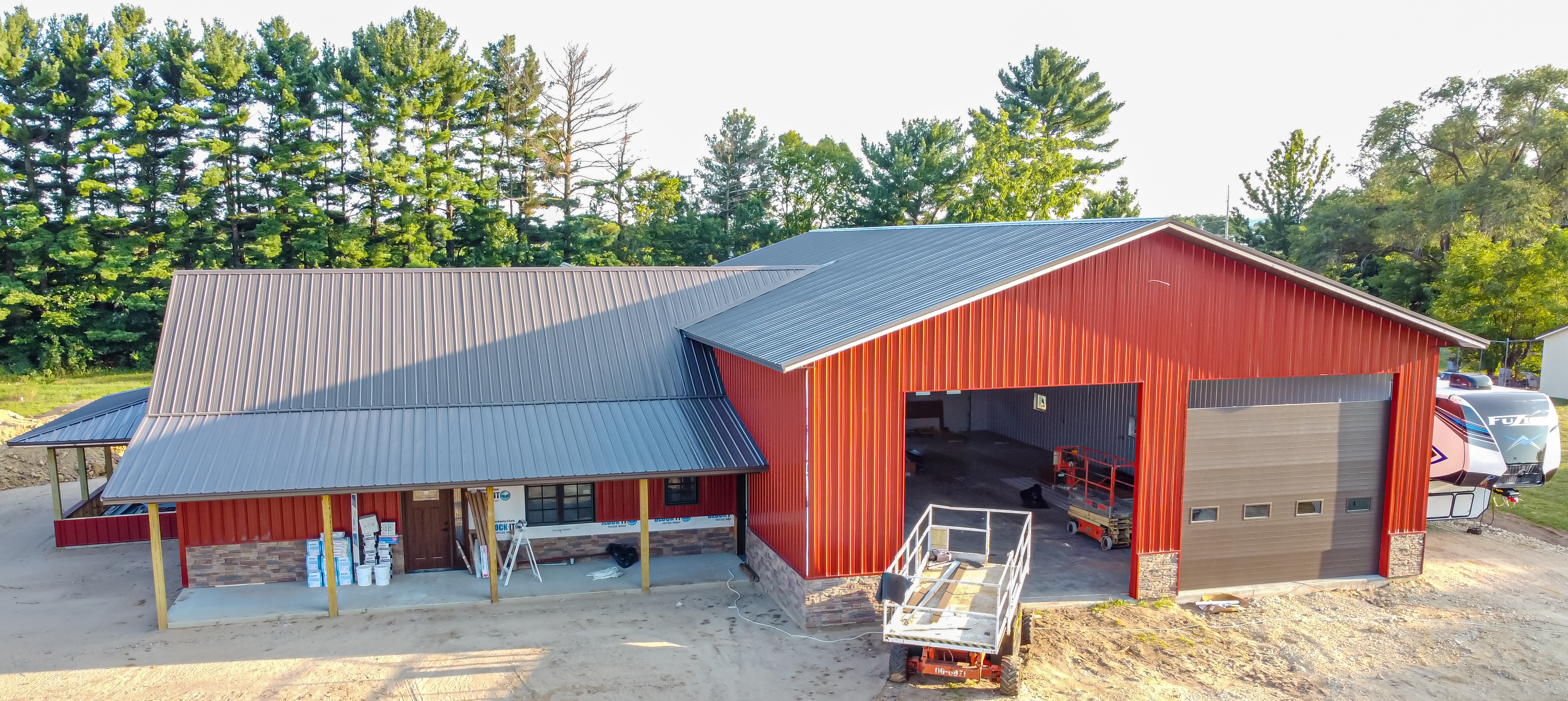
Barndominium under construction with corrugated roof and siding

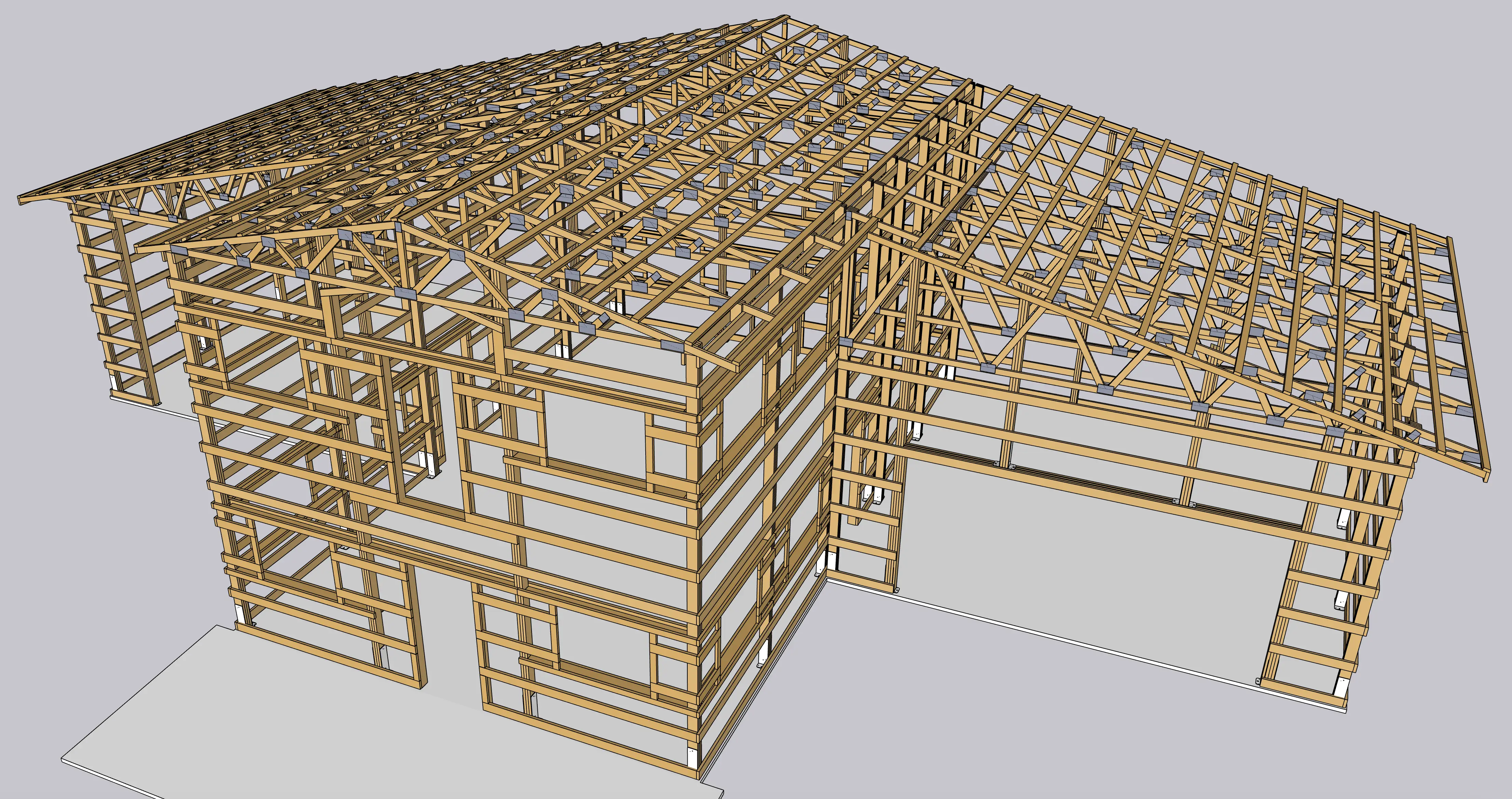
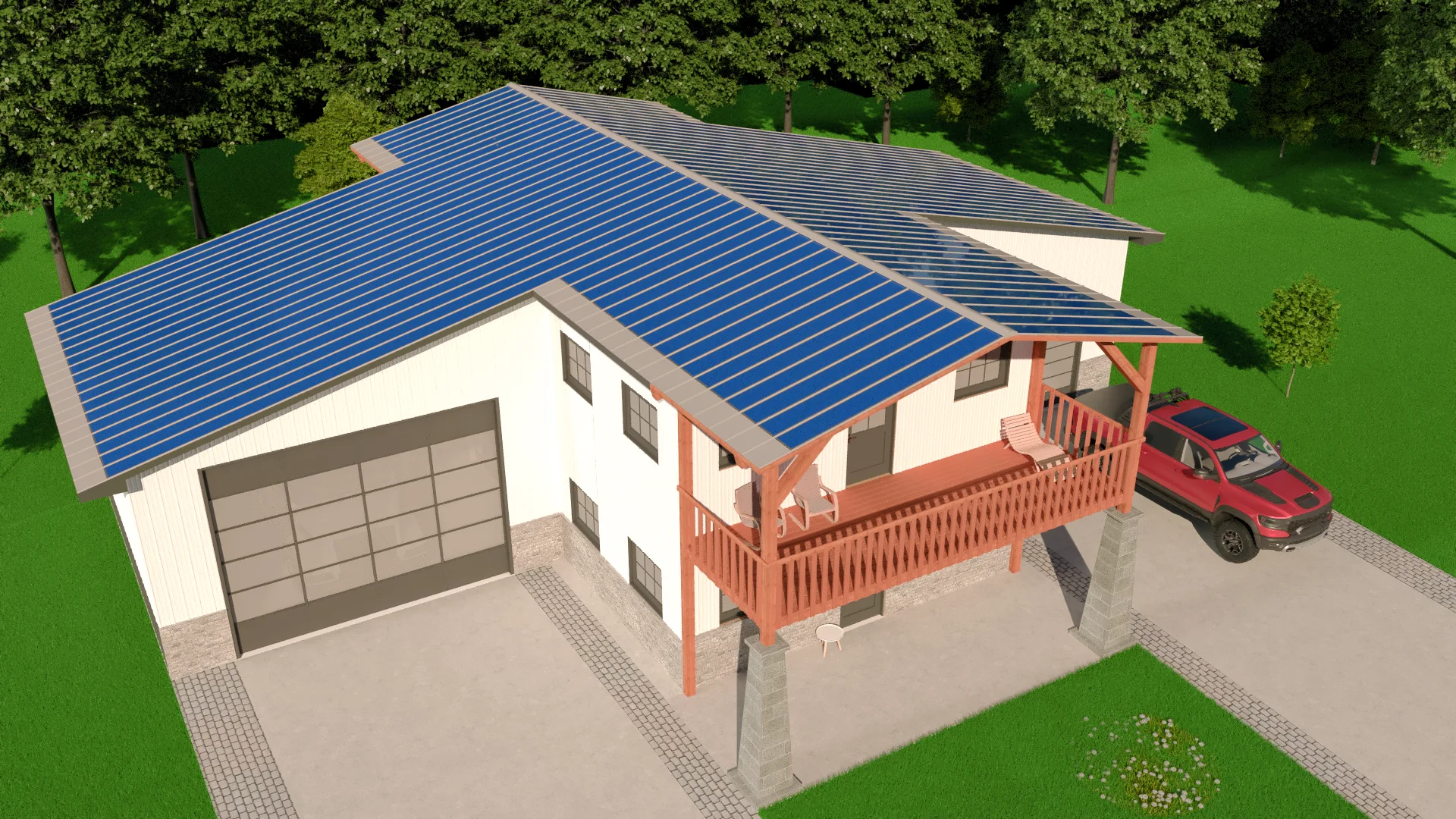
Post-frame barndominium with two-car garage on one side and a large drive-through garage on the other

A barndominium, also known as a barndo, is a metal pole barn, post-frame or barn-like structure with sheet metal siding that has been partially or fully converted into a furnished home or living area. Outside of the US, a project of this type would typically be called a "converted barn", and sheet metal would not be a characteristic element.

Barndominium designs can include structural conversion into a full home, whereby the entire interior consists of a living area, and partial conversions, whereby part of the space is used for living and part is used for other purposes, such as a workshop, garage space, for storage or as an animal pen. Some barndominiums double as both a residence and as a place of business. A similar style is the shouse (workshop plus house).

The term barndominium was originally coined by Karl Nilsen, who was a real estate developer in Connecticut. Barndominium is derived from using a combination of the words barn and condominium. The original use of the phrase referred to a master-planned development that centered on living near horses. The term was then readopted in the mid-2000s to refer to metal homes that were used as a primary residence. In 2016, Chip and Joanna Gaines of the HGTV show Fixer Upper used the term barndominium to refer to a metal building that was featured on the show. This caused a massive surge in popularity and growing acceptance of the term barndominium to refer to a metal primary residence, not just a home with horse barns.

Indeed, Google Trends data indicates a steady rise in interest in barndominiums, notably boosted by their portrayal on HGTV (Home & Garden Television). The surge in attention and demand, especially evident in 2020, shows no signs of slowing down. However, the term barndominium is being used more flexibly these days, regardless of what kind of frame it is built on. Whether constructed with a metal frame or a traditional post-frame, they are commonly labeled as barndominiums, emphasizing the style and feel over construction method. Much like colonial, modern, or craftsman style homes, barndominium seems to have earned its place as another distinct category among architectural styles.

Due to their open-floor layout, barndominiums are highly customizable, and can be constructed as one- to three-story dwellings. In the United States, some companies purvey barndominium kits that are customizable relative to local or state building requirements and geographical elements, such as risks of earthquakes, snow load levels and fire risks.

== Costs ==
Barndominiums typically have lower overall construction, labor and materials costs compared to traditionally-built modern homes. Specifically, even though the construction materials may be more expensive, labor costs and building time can be significantly lower. States such as West Virginia, Alabama, and Mississippi have the lowest costs of building a barndominium at less than $100 per square foot.

However, the total cost of the barndominium depends heavily on the insulation types which have been governed by the United States Department of Energy (DOE). Since the DOE sets the R-value of the barndominium insulation based on the zone, sometimes cost deviates significantly due to the climate and the location of the barndominium.

Obtaining a mortgage can be more difficult than usual, as lenders are uncertain how to determine the value of non-traditional homes.

== See also ==
- Barn
- Converted barn
- Housebarn
- List of house types
