= Pierre-François-Guillaume Boullay =

Officier Pierre-François-Guillaume Boullay
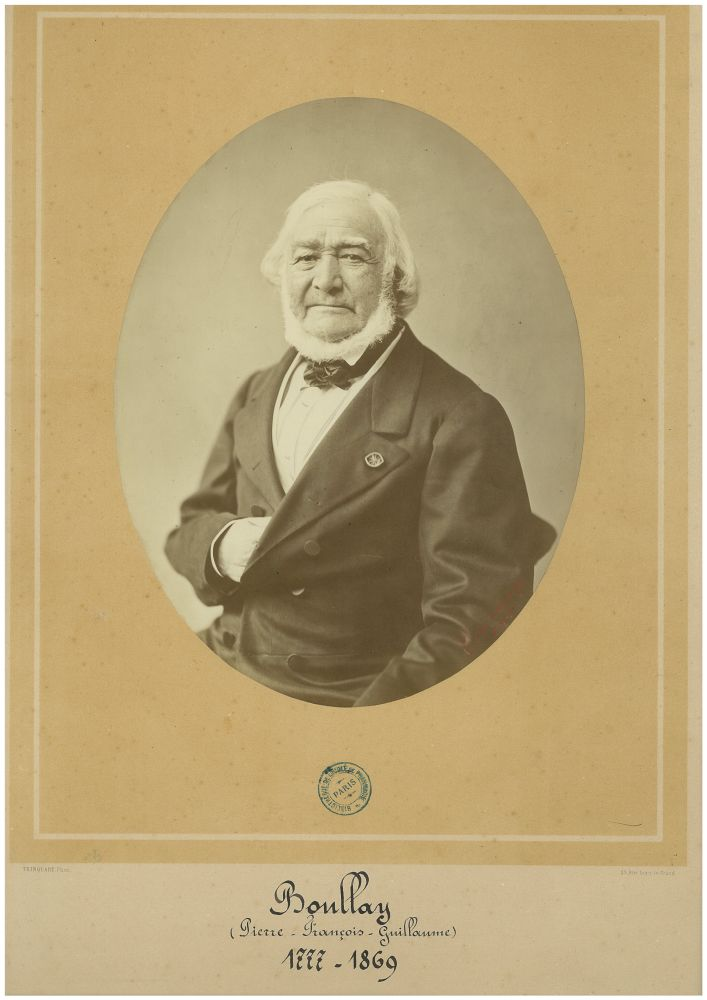
- Born: 21 April 1777; Caen
- Died: 2 November 1869 (aged 92); 9th arrondissement of Paris
- Occupations: Chemist, Pharmacist
- Organization: Académie nationale de médecine
- Known for: First to isolate Ether
- Children: Félix-Polydore Boullay
- Honours: Officier de la Légion d'honneur

Pierre-François-Guillaume Boullay (21 April 1777, Caen – 2 November 1869, Paris) was a French chemist and pharmacist.

After studying pharmacy and chemistry, he became a preparator for the course of chemistry held by Louis-Nicolas Vauquelin and opened a drug store. Doctor in Sciences by 1818, he was elected a member of the French Académie de Médecine that he would eventually head after 1834.

He published various works on ethers, sweet almonds, as well as the extraction of picrotoxin, among others.

With his son Félix-Polydore, they were the first to transform alcohol into ether (alcohol deshydratation) using phosphoric acid. phosphorique. His son and him are also credited for the diffusion of the principle of percolation as a method of extraction.

His son and coworker, Félix-Polydore Boullay (1806–1835), died at 29 years old of the consequences of an accident while manipulating ether.
