= Percolation =

Filtration of fluids through porous materials

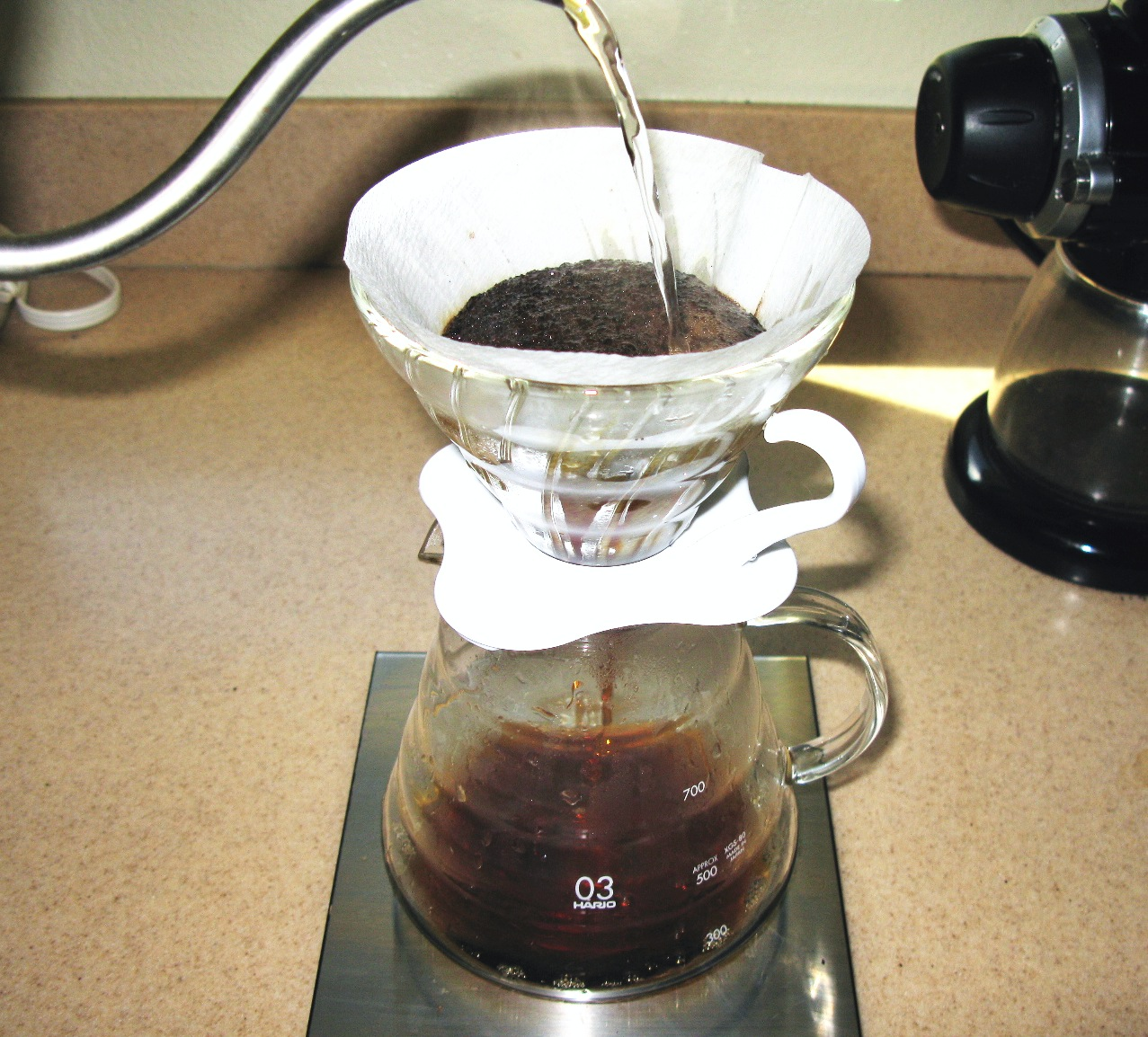
In coffee percolation, soluble compounds leave the coffee grounds and join the water to form coffee. Insoluble compounds (and granulates) remain within the coffee filter.

Percolation in a square lattice.

In physics, chemistry, and materials science, percolation (from Latin percolare 'to filter, trickle through', coined in the 1840s by Edward Loysel) refers to the movement and filtering of fluids through porous materials. It is not described by Darcy's law. Broader applications have since been developed that cover connectivity of many systems modeled as lattices or graphs, analogous to connectivity of lattice components in the filtration problem that modulates capacity for percolation.

== Background ==
=== Origins ===
In Western Europe, percolation was a process formally invented in the early nineteenth century, particularly in researching methods of extraction for apothecary and pharmaceutical substances. Important contributions were made by Jöns Jacob Berzelius, the Count of Real, Pierre-François-Guillaume Boullay, who generally referred to the process as "displacement." In 1845, Edward Loysel coined the term and popularised it with his coffee machine.

=== Recent history ===
During the last decades, percolation theory, the mathematical study of percolation, has brought new understanding and techniques to a broad range of topics in physics, materials science, complex networks, epidemiology, and other fields. For example, in geology, percolation refers to filtration of water through soil and permeable rocks. The water flows to recharge the groundwater in the water table and aquifers. In places where infiltration basins or septic drain fields are planned to dispose of substantial amounts of water, a percolation test is needed beforehand to determine whether the intended structure is likely to succeed or fail. In two dimensional square lattice percolation is defined as follows. A site is "occupied" with probability p or "empty" (in which case its edges are removed) with probability 1 – p; the corresponding problem is called site percolation, see Fig. 2.

Percolation typically exhibits universality. Statistical physics concepts such as scaling theory, renormalization, phase transition, critical phenomena and fractals are used to characterize percolation properties. Combinatorics is commonly employed to study percolation thresholds.

Due to the complexity involved in obtaining exact results from analytical models of percolation, computer simulations are typically used. The current fastest algorithm for percolation was published in 2000 by Mark Newman and Robert Ziff.

== Examples ==
- Coffee percolation (see Fig. 1), where the solvent is water, the permeable substance is the coffee grounds, and the soluble constituents are the chemical compounds that give coffee its color, taste, and aroma.
- Movement of weathered material down on a slope under the earth's surface.
- Cracking of trees with the presence of two conditions, sunlight and pressure.
- Collapse and robustness of biological virus shells to random subunit removal (experimentally-verified fragmentation of viruses).
- Transport in porous media.
- Spread of diseases.
- Surface roughening.
- Dental percolation, increase rate of decay under crowns because of a conducive environment for strep mutants and lactobacillus
- Potential sites for septic systems are tested by the "perc test". Example/theory: A hole (usually 6–10 inches in diameter) is dug in the ground surface (usually 12–24" deep). Water is filled in to the hole, and the time is measured for a drop of one inch in the water surface. If the water surface quickly drops, as usually seen in poorly-graded sands, then it is a potentially good place for a septic "leach field". If the hydraulic conductivity of the site is low (usually in clayey and loamy soils), then the site is undesirable.

== See also ==
- Branched polymer
- Conductance
- Critical exponents
- Fragmentation
- Gelation
- Giant component
- Groundwater recharge
- Immunization
- Network theory
- Percolation critical exponents
- Percolation theory
- Percolation threshold
- Polymerization
- Self-organization
- Self-organized criticality
- Septic tank
- Supercooled water
- Water pipe percolator
