= Saint-André-d'Hébertot =

- Commune
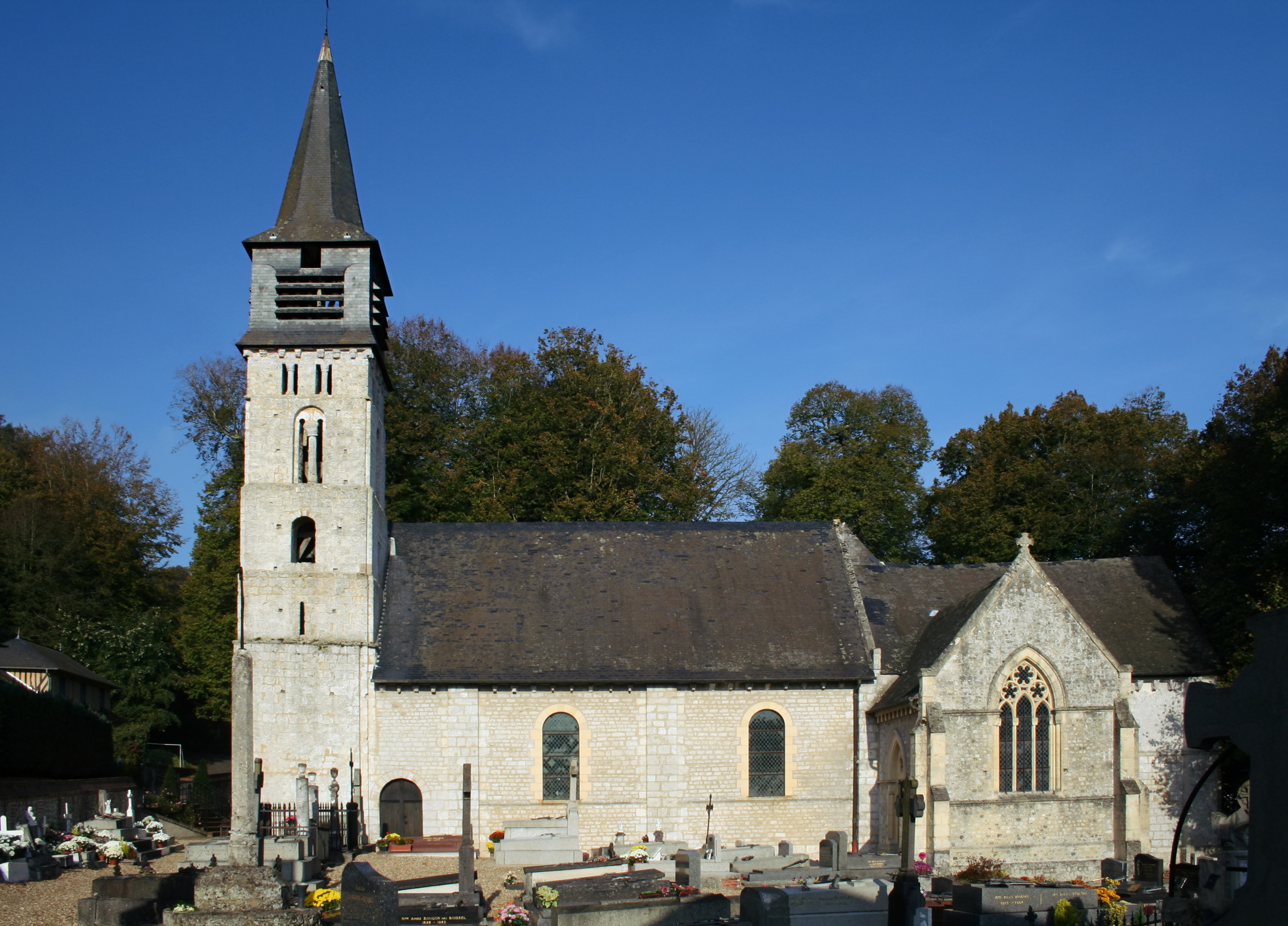
- The church in Saint-André-d'Hébertot
- Location of Saint-André-d'Hébertot
- Location within France Location within Normandy
- Coordinates: 49°18′50″N 0°16′49″E
- Country: France
- Region: Normandy
- Department: Calvados
- Arrondissement: Lisieux
- Canton: Pont-l'Évêque
- Intercommunality: CC Terre d'Auge

Government
  - Mayor (2020–2026): Pierre Bougard
- Area^{1}: 9.79 km^{2} (3.78 sq mi)
- Elevation: 92 m (302 ft)
- Highest elevation: 146 m (479 ft)
- Lowest elevation: 23 m (75 ft)
- Population (2023): 451
  - Density: 46.1/km^{2} (119/sq mi)
- Time zone: UTC+01:00 (CET)
  - Summer (DST): UTC+02:00 (CEST)
- INSEE/Postal code: 14555 /14130
- ^{1} French Land Register data, which excludes lakes, ponds, glaciers > 1 km^{2} (0.386 sq mi or 247 acres) and river estuaries.

Saint-André-d'Hébertot (French pronunciation: [sɛ̃.t‿ɑ̃dʁe debɛʁto]) is a commune in the Calvados department in the Normandy region in northwestern France.

== Population ==
Historical population
Year	Pop.	±% p.a.
1968	301	—
1975	257	−2.23%
1982	244	−0.74%
1990	292	+2.27%
1999	390	+3.27%
2007	452	+1.86%
2012	459	+0.31%
2017	444	−0.66%
2023	451	+0.26%
Source: INSEE

== See also ==
- Communes of the Calvados department
