= Sustainable urban infrastructure =

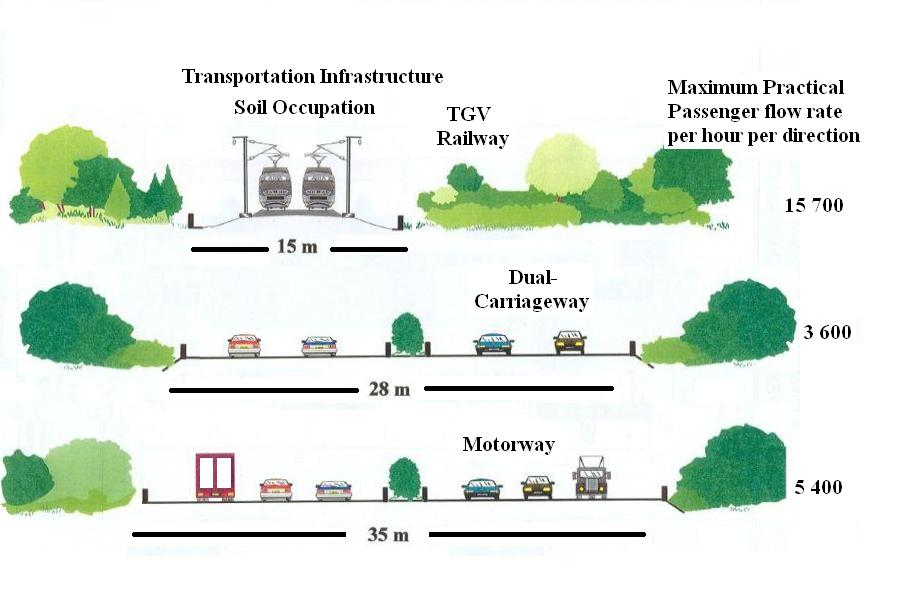

Sustainable urban infrastructure expands on the concept of urban infrastructure by adding the sustainability element with the expectation of improved and more resilient urban development. In the construction and physical and organizational structures that enable cities to function, sustainability also aims to meet the needs of the present generation without compromising the capabilities of the future generations.

Sustainable Development Goal 9 (SDG 9), of the international Sustainable Development Goals set by the United Nations General Assembly, deals with infrastructure, however, infrastructure is a building block for the rest of the SDGs. Therefore, the achievement of sustainable infrastructure is of significant concern in multiple areas of society.

The sustainable development of urban areas is crucial since more than 56% of the world's population lives in cities. Cities are in the lead of climate action, while being responsible for an estimated 75% of the world's carbon emissions.

== Concept ==
A bibliometric study, published in 2019, of the evolution of research regarding sustainable urban infrastructure emphasizes that this concept continues to grow in the research community and change in scope as technology improves. According to the College of Engineering and Applied Science of the University of Colorado Denver, urban infrastructure refers to the engineered systems (water, energy, transport, sanitation, information) that make up a city. Not solely based on evaluating utilities, sustainability efforts in urban infrastructure seek to combat global warming and municipal waste, as well as encourage economic prosperity. Socioeconomic implications of these efforts often involve policy and governance in the implementation of sustainable infrastructure, and their variation results in different programs sized on national, regional, or more local scales. Challenges resulting from increasing population growth have generated a need for sustainable infrastructure that is high performing, cost-effective, resource-efficient and environmentally-friendly.

The United States Environmental Protection Agency maintains that the planning process of sustainable design can lead to the development of a community that is ecologically, economically, and socially sustainable. The design for a sustainable urban infrastructure emphasizes localization and sustainable living. According to the principle of sustainable development, the aim is to reduce an individual's ecological footprint in areas with a high population density.

The criteria for what can be included in this kind of urban environment vary from place to place given differences in existing infrastructure and built form, climate, and availability of local resources and talents.

Generally speaking, the following could be considered sustainable urban infrastructure:

- public transport networks
- distributed generation and integrated energy demand management initiatives and programs
- high efficiency buildings and other development constraints such as only permitting the construction of green buildings and sustainable habitats with energy-efficient landscaping.
- connected green spaces and wildlife corridors
- low impact development practices to protect water resources
- disaster mitigation techniques and plans
- highly integrative communication networks
- systems to increase accessibility of localized and renewable resources

A more systematic view of sustainable urban infrastructure has grown in popularity. Instead of just focusing on housing and space, experts now incorporate ideas regarding urban resource metabolism, the interconnectedness of citizens, and the complex vulnerabilities that cities develop over time. Green infrastructure is a subset of sustainable urban infrastructure, and mostly considers ecological implications, water resources, and nature-based solutions.

== Global Initiatives ==
=== Generalized ===
When comparing volume of research and developments, the United States, the United Kingdom, Australia, and China are the most involved in generating solutions for infrastructure. Different national priorities often result in different sustainability foci among countries. According to a review of available projects and research, the United States and United Kingdom prioritize sustainable solutions towards culture, water, disasters, and urban planning. The United States especially has made progress with green infrastructure initiatives (e.g. Green Alley Programs). China and Australia have similar priorities, but Australian tourism takes larger precedence as opposed to disaster prevention, while China is significantly involved in governance, electricity, and land development.

=== Africa ===
Existing infrastructure and governance challenges in general can slow progression towards sustainable urban practices. The United Nations' 2030 Sustainable Development Agenda, applicable for a multitude of African countries, seeks to deal with these challenges while working towards sustainability. According to the UN, only 40% of the African population lives in urban areas, but these urban areas, and their interconnectedness, are quickly growing, requiring the consideration of sustainability. In light of this, the African Union (AU) began its own sustainability and infrastructure initiative in Agenda 2063: The Africa We Want. African discourse with the UN has notably referenced the ethical extraction of resources and equitable access to resources as measures of sustainability within the infrastructure of a society's urban culture and metabolism. However, a lack of consistent government regulation and socioeconomic conditions continue to hinder attempts to establish a resilient and sustainably motivated network of cities across Africa. A national movement to create integrative urban policies, which have been adopted by many African countries, gives hope to the idea of governmental commitment to cooperatively developing land in the best interest of growing urban areas.

=== Australia ===
In contrast to the increasing Chinese population, the population in Australia faces threatened resiliency due to decreasing population growth rates. More efficient land development, also carried out by an integrated group of bureaucratic bodies throughout Australia, and multiuse utility systems can maximize the social, environmental, and economic benefits of a country regardless of whether the population is increasing or decreasing.

=== Canada ===
Sustainable urban infrastructure is also called sustainable municipal infrastructure in Canada. It is an infrastructure initiative that facilitates progress towards the goal of sustainable living in a place or region. Attention is paid to technological and government policies which enable urban planning for sustainable architecture and sustainable agriculture.

In Canada, several organizations related to the FCM InfraGuide project, including the Federation of Canadian Municipalities, Housing, Infrastructure and Communities Canada, National Research Council of Canada, and Canadian Public Works Association, seek to achieve sustainability in municipal infrastructure, especially large scale urban infrastructure. These organizations advocate environmental protocols, and inclusion of ecological and social indicators and factors in decision making at the earliest possible stage. There is little focus yet on sustainable rural infrastructure, though, this is a stated goal of the project, as is the achievement of sustainable rural development in developing nations.

In their view, sustainability concerns apply to all of "maintaining, repairing and upgrading the infrastructure that sustains our quality of life" including at least:

- municipal decision making and investment planning
- potable water supply
- stormwater and wastewater especially minimizing the distance that such water travels to be treated and reused
- roads and sidewalks and their integration with transit systems to achieve smoother flow of people
- environmental protocols and multidisciplinary practices to ensure they are respected, e.g. green procurement.

These and other Canadian official entities, including the Auditor General of Canada and Service Canada, are focused on related efforts such as municipal performance audits, information technology, communications technology, moral purchasing and sharing of "data, information, common infrastructure, technology," and the need to "integrate their business processes." In particular, this integration further reduces duplication and waste, especially e-waste and greenhouse gas emissions that were a concern under Kyoto Protocol targets that Canada committed to achieve. In 2011, Canada withdrew from the Kyoto Protocol due to economic concerns.

=== China ===
The increasing population of China has significantly impacted the ratio of resource consumption to resource production, which has put pressure on the Chinese government and economy to establish a more efficient way of using resources to permit sustained longevity of Chinese society. The Circular Economy Policy has already begun to address this issue by enforcing repeated analysis and reuse throughout a product's entire life cycle. To solve this problem, first of all, China will improve to promote the progress of science and technology and business management and improve labor efficiency. The second is to guide enterprises to optimize the combination of production factors following market needs and achieve the interface between production and demand. Thirdly the government will allow competition and the mechanism of eliminating winners and losers among enterprises to enhance the ability to produce and operate goods. Last but not least, the Chinese government plans modern urban centers in completely different areas. A modern framework includes open transportation, water supply, and distinctive private regions and mechanical regions dissemination. First-world and developed countries, such as some parts of China, often seek to grow exponentially in economic productivity and consumerism, but this exponential growth must be matched with an exponential drop in resource consumption that may be achieved through an integrated system approach. This systematic approach of incorporating consumerist and lifestyle changes on many societal levels, reflects the systematic dynamic of sustainable urban infrastructure. By treating sustainability as a function of interconnected systems (e.g. transportation, land development, community formation, etc.), the impact of any change in one system can be amplified without causing a sector of infrastructure to singularly fail.

=== Indonesia ===
The redevelopment of North Jakarta was the subject of a 2012 project to evaluate the effectiveness of implementing sustainable design, as well as public knowledge about the benefits of such design. City areas along the coast particularly suffer from large socioeconomic gaps, high density slums, and poor development planning. Results from the Structural Equations Model (SEM) revealed that, although sustainable redesigning would help uplift coastal areas, public efficacy towards sustainable urban infrastructure was lacking significantly. Public surveys conducted in Jakarta emphasized the following priorities:

- land use
- public transportation
- built space
- open space
- network infrastructure and waste
- energy
- hydrology
- air and sun

By applying sustainable technology and methods to these components of infrastructure, the government seeks to reinvigorate the socioeconomic wellbeing of North Jakarta. However, in order to effectively create a wholly resilient society, the project stresses that the design process must be shared between government initiatives, the commercial sector, and public opinion. This mutual relationship is reflected in the project philosophy, which viewed cities as an ecosystem of the aforementioned priorities shared effectively among different levels of society in order to thrive. One of the biggest challenges faced when implementing sustainable design is expected to be the quantification of future operational costs and maintenance, which are ideally offset by the benefits of increased sustainability.

=== Switzerland ===
The Swiss Global Infrastructure Basel Foundation (GIB) supports various stakeholders, such as governments, banks, and cities, in designing, implementing, and financing sustainable urban infrastructure projects at all stages of the project cycle. Currently, GIB has developed, in cooperation with the French bank Natixis, the SuRe® Standard – The Standard for Sustainable and Resilient Infrastructure, which is a global voluntary ISEAL standard. GIB has also developed the SuRe® SmartScan, a simplified version of the SuRe® Standard that serves as a self-assessment tool for sustainable infrastructure projects. It provides project developers with a comprehensive analysis of the various themes covered by the SuRe® Standard, offering a solid foundation for green infrastructure projects that are planning to become certified by the SuRe® Standard.

== Infrastructural aspects ==
=== Roadway materials ===
Roadside and urban infrastructures such as signposts, bollards, and street furniture are prone to damage and deterioration. As infrastructure deteriorates, it requires either replacement or enhancement. Existing public funding sources are inadequate to meet these needs. Self-healing technology could protect surrounding paving and foundations from damage when items of infrastructure are impacted, which can reduce maintenance and improve the sustainability of urban developments. Self-healing developments result in zero waste and zero-landfill from maintenance on items of urban infrastructure for the life of the development.

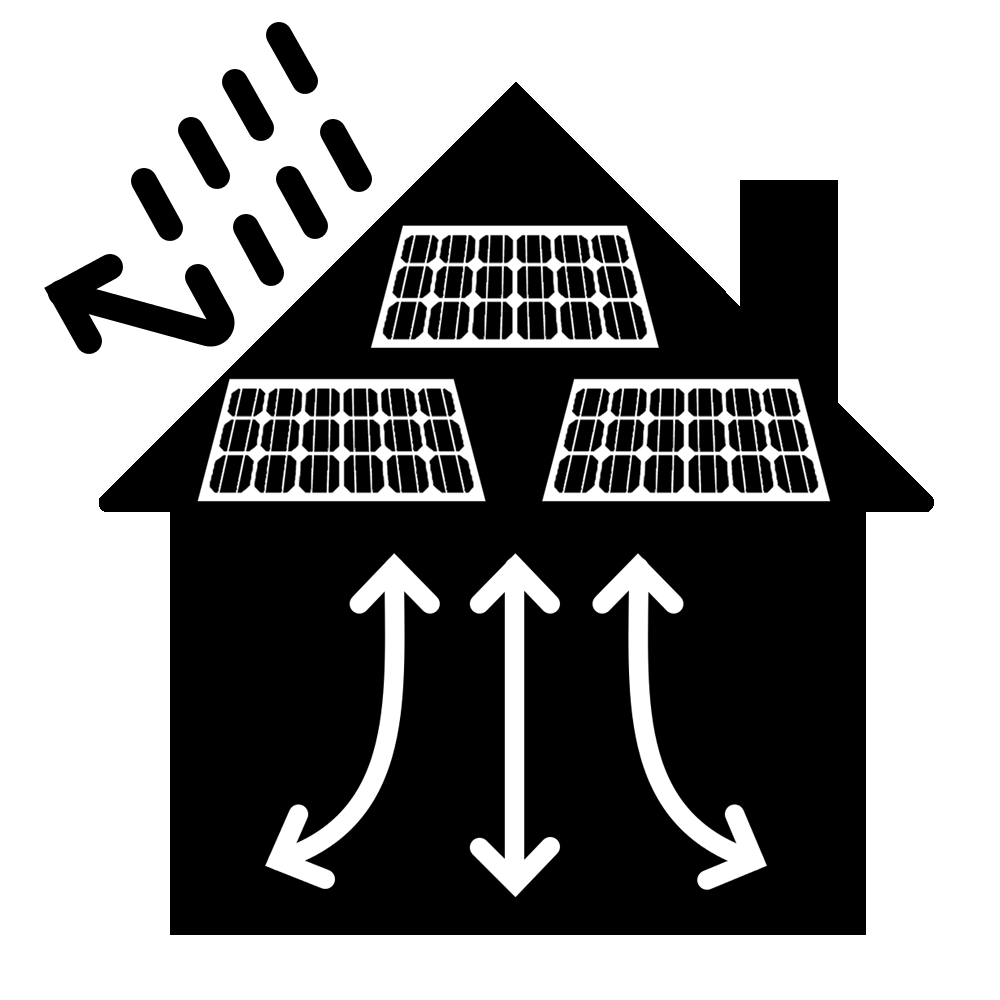
Net-zero energy building using passive design and renewable energy

=== Renewable energy ===
Policy and technology are key factors in the implementation of renewable energy sources, which not only improve energy efficiency, but also the electricity demand of communication networks and the self-sufficiency of a city in the instance of disaster. Projects that involve zero-energy buildings, reduced cooling and heating demand, and greater understanding of occupant behavior achieve a greater holistic perspective of wasteful energy sourcing.

=== Smart grid ===
Distributed generation and energy demand management are components of the smart grid, a term for an electrical grid that uses renewable and energy efficient means of generation. An optimized city might also use the smart grid for communication networks, the Internet, and other electronic signals that build the electronic and cultural infrastructure of urban communities. Electric vehicles and substations link transportation with the grid, and commercial transactions over the Internet directly link the economy. As cities grow larger and more electronically dependent, reliability and security become significant concerns for institutions and private citizens. By using a renewable and efficient system, a city can reduce the threat of a collapse of power and information services.

=== Transportation ===
To reduce overall footprint, transportation infrastructure requires a localized consumer base made accessible by integrative design within neighborhoods. This design, which results from effective land development, is ideally overseen by competent governance. Consistent funding and effective investments also allow public transportation to maintain stable services, keeping the city itself more stable as a result. These aforementioned concepts are one interpretation of the "4 Pillars of Transportation" known as

- Governance
- Financing
- Neighborhoods
- Infrastructure

Automobile emissions associated with urban congestion directly correlate with a decline in urban citizen health, making public transportation more optimized for maintaining resilient public and environmental health. Once again, cost-effectiveness is important, in that maintenance costs must be exceeded by benefits (monetary and/or societal), but oftentimes state-owned public transportation suffers significant losses.

=== Resources ===
A common governance and administration method subjected to studies, such as from the Complex and Sustainable Urban Networks (CSUN) Laboratory at the University of Illinois at Chicago, is the control of resource supply and demand. When supply and demand are manipulated, it may be possible to steer an urban society toward resources and forms of infrastructure that are more conservatively used and conducive towards sustained use. In addition, by systematically designing interdependencies and multifunctionality among forms of urban infrastructure, a society ensures that, if one part of infrastructure fails, other parts can help remediate the loss in service. This references back to integrative design as well.

Life cycle assessments of resource materials can also help calculate the environmental footprint of a city. In 2017, at least 84 sampled cities from around the globe had a projected footprint increase of 58%-116% by 2050. If the cities reduced resource consumption on a social and technical basis, and adopted energy efficient practices, the projected footprint improved dramatically. Unfortunately, these statistics are often difficult to compare because the exact conditions, resources, and assets of the cities all differed. The countries are more relatable, however, when globally valued resources are used, thus encouraging international dialogue, planning and foresight.

== See also ==
- Sustainable city
- Environmental design
- Green infrastructure
- Landscape urbanism AALU
- New Urbanism
- Regional Planning
- Right to mobility
- Smart city
- Sustainable urban drainage systems
- Transit-Oriented Development
- Sustainable Implant
- Eco-cities
- Urban ecology
