= André Schneider =

André Schneider may refer to:

- André Schneider-Laub, German high jumper
- André Schneider (businessman), Swiss businessman
