= Susannah Drake =

British architect (born 1965)

Susannah Churchill Drake
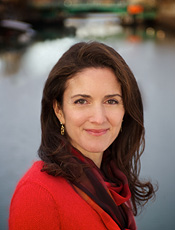
- Education: Dartmouth College; Harvard Graduate School of Design
- Occupations: Landscape Architect and Architect

Susannah Drake (born 1965) is a practicing architect and landscape architect who specializes in addressing contemporary social and environmental issues through design.

== Background and education ==
Drake was born in Cambridge, England in 1965, and holds dual citizenship for the United States and the United Kingdom. Drake earned a Bachelor of Arts at Dartmouth College and Master of Architecture and Master of Landscape Architecture at Harvard Graduate School of Design. She is both a practicing architect and a practicing landscape architect.

== Career ==
Drake founded the Brooklyn-based DLANDdstudio, an interdisciplinary landscape and architectural design firm, in 2005. The firm's focus is improving urban environments through the incorporation of ecology. Drake herself is known for projects that address social issues and seek to limit the impacts of climate change, believing in the role of soft waterfronts, "in which the line between the water and the city is blurred, diffused, thickened."

Under her leadership, DLANDstudio received significant recognition for its innovative designs and work, including the Gowanus Canal Sponge Park in Brooklyn, an EPA Superfund Site.

Drake has also focused on improving the lived ecology of urban and campus environments. Her recent work with Argenta Commons Plaza in Little Rock, Arkansas gained praise for "striking a balance between art and nature," with forms reflecting the oxbow lakes that prominent in the North Little Rock Area. She has received generous funding for work in stormwater management, adaptive infrastructure, and mitigative park creation from the Graham Foundation, the Environmental Protection Agency, the New England Interstate Water Pollution Control Commission, the New York State Department of Environmental Conservation, and the New York State Council on the Arts.

In addition to her professional pursuits, in 2019 she was appointed associate professor at the University of Colorado Boulder Program in Environmental Design. She is currently on the Board of Directors of the Regional Plan Association and Clyfford Still Museum. She has also served as president and Trustee of the New York ASLA and as a Trustee of the Van Alen Institute. She is currently a peer advisor to the US Department of State Bureau of Overseas Operations.

=== Style ===
Drake's work focuses on creating sustainable and ecologically integrated landscapes that address environmental issues while improving urban life. Drake has also championed the concept of ecological corridors, inspired by the work of ecologist Richard T. T. Forman. Her firm applies this idea to urban infrastructure, such as the controversial Brooklyn-Queens Expressway. Drake's design for BQ Green involves capping a section of the BQE to create open space and recreational areas for the South Williamsburg community, addressing both environmental and social needs. In addition to her design work, Drake is an advocate for the economic benefits of ecological interventions in urban areas. She frequently uses economic data to demonstrate the long-term value of green infrastructure, such as the financial gains associated with tree planting for water management and air pollution control.

=== Major built works ===
Drake is most known for her interdisciplinary work addressing difficult problems of contemporary design.

- QueensWay: linear park and greenway in Central Queens
- Argenta Commons Plaza: Little Rock, AR
- College of Tropical Agriculture and Human Resources at the University of Hawaii at Manoa
- College of Music IMIG Addition at the University of Colorado Boulder
- Gowanus Canal Sponge Park: Brooklyn, NY

In 2021, she was selected as one of the three finalists to redevelop Philadelphia's Benjamin Franklin Parkway for pedestrian use.

=== Major publications ===
- Contributor: "A Blueprint for Coastal Adaptation" (Island Press 2021)"Coastal Urbanism: Designing the Future Waterfront"
- Contributor: Nature and Cities (Lincoln Land Institute, 2016). "WPA 2.0: Beauty, Economics, and Politics in the Creation of Public Infrastructure"
- "Elastic Landscape: Seeding Ecology in Public Space & Urban Infrastructure" was recently published in Infrastruktururbanismus

=== Awards ===
Drake's Rising Currents project, a collaboration with ARO Architects, featured design strategies for urban waterfronts. The project was part of MoMA's "A New Urban Ground" exhibition in 2010, and is a part of the museum's permanent collection.

- Cooper Hewitt Smithsonian National Design Award Climate Resilience 2020
- New Practices New York award (2014)
- National AIA Young Architects Award (2013)
- Architectural League Emerging Voice (2013)
