= André Schneider (businessman) =

André Schneider (born. 19 November 1959) is the retired CEO of Genève Aéroport Chairman of the innovation board of the Aviation Research Center Switzerland and World Climate Foundation, Vice-Chairman of Global Infrastructure Basel, member of the board of ACI Europe, and former Chief Operating Officer of World Economic Forum.

Schneider worked for IBM for over a decade, spending two years as a software developer in Barcelona, Spain. He became the consultant and principal at the company Geneva. In 1998, he joined the World Economic Forum and by 2002 he became the Managing Director and COO. In 2010, he left the World Economic Forum and created his own consulting company in the domain of sustainable development. In 2013, he became the Vice-President for Resources and Infrastructures at EPFL.
