= Cities Climate Finance Leadership Alliance =

The Cities Climate Finance Leadership Alliance (CCFLA) is a coalition of more than sixty organizations actively working to accelerate investment into sustainable infrastructure. The Alliance brings together a wide range of public and private institutions. For example, the Swiss Global Infrastructure Basel Foundation (GIB) is a member of the CCFLA Steering Committee, and occupies the “Research/NGO/Foundations” seat. The Alliance was launched at the United Nations Secretary-General’s Climate Summit in September 2014. In 2016, R20 Regions of Climate Action was elected to lead the Secretariat of CCFLA, partnering with three other organizations: FMDV, UNDP, and UNEP. Climate Policy Initiative became Secretariat of CCFLA in 2019.
