= Nik Gowing =

British television journalist

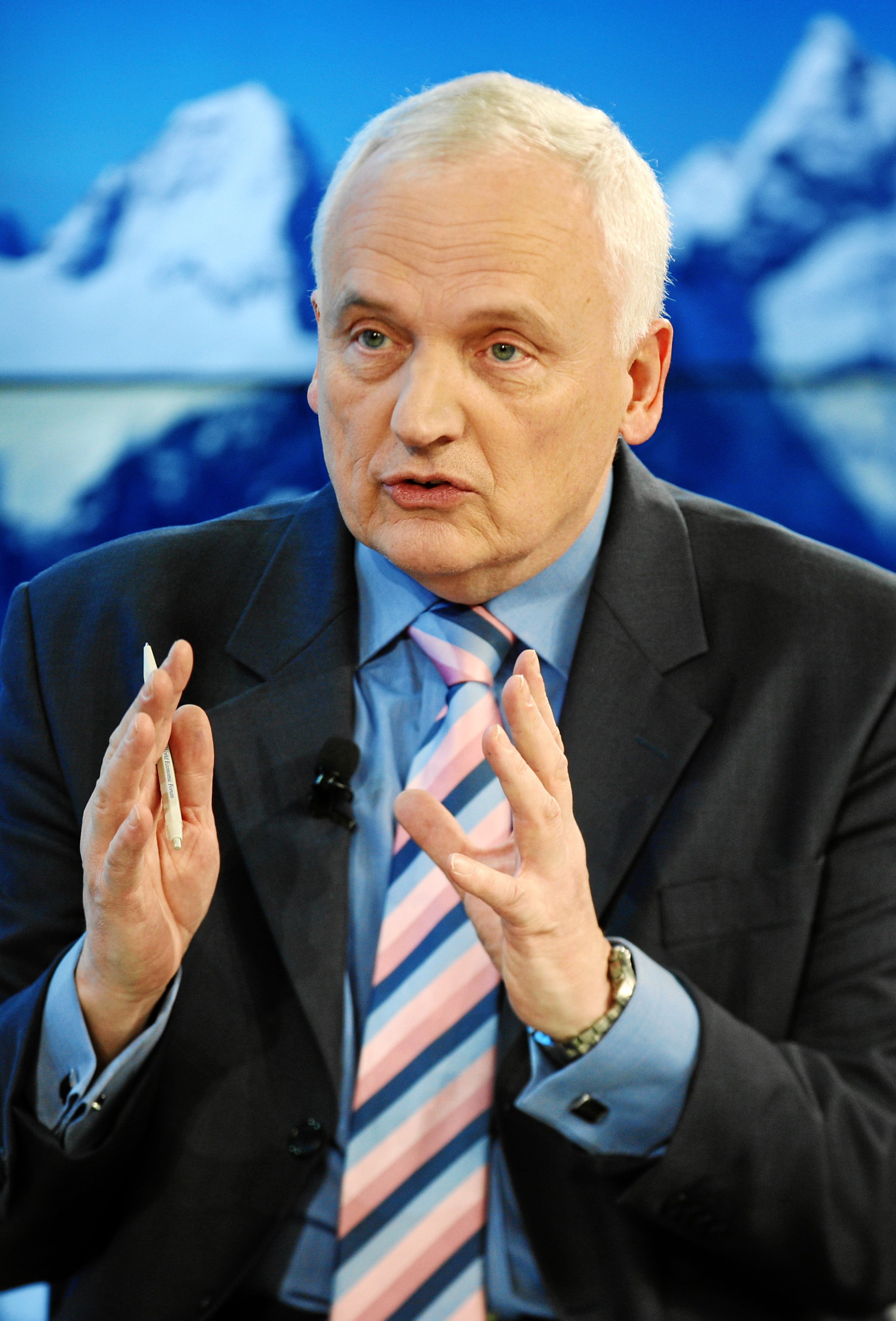
- Gowing at the World Economic Forum annual meeting, 2012
- Born: Nik Keith Gowing; 1951 (age 74–75); United Kingdom
- Education: University of Bristol
- Occupation: News anchor of BBC
- Notable credit(s): The Hub; BBC World News
- Spouse: Judy
- Children: 2
- Relatives: Margaret Gowing (mother)

Nik Keith Gowing (born 1951) is a British television journalist.

== Overview ==
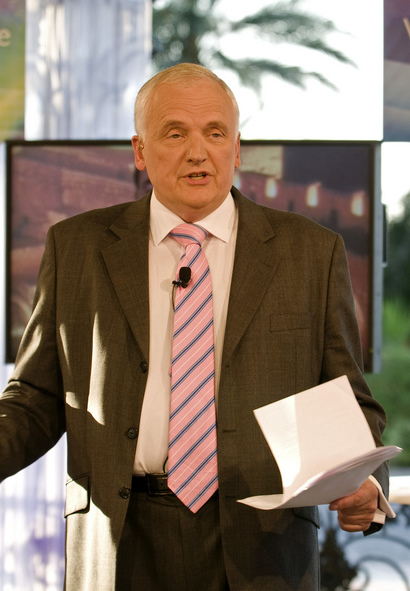
Gowing at the World Economic Forum on the Middle East, 2010

Nik Gowing was educated at the Simon Langton Grammar School in Canterbury and Latymer Upper School in London, followed by the University of Bristol.

A foreign affairs specialist and presenter at ITN from 1978, Gowing became Diplomatic Editor for the flagship Channel 4 News from 1989. During his time with the BBC, Gowing has since presented The World Today (1996–2000), Europe Direct, HARDtalk, Dateline London, as well as Simpson's World.

At the time of the death of Princess Diana in 1997, Gowing anchored coverage for over seven hours, reportedly only having had 40 minutes sleep before being driven back to Television Centre to present. BBC World was being simulcast for the first ever time with the BBC domestic channel BBC One, making up a global audience of around half a billion, to whom he announced her death.

Gowing was on air for six hours during the BBC's coverage of the aftermath of the September 11th 2001 attacks, which led to the channel receiving the 2002 Hotbird Award.

Gowing was a moderator at the 'Peace to Prosperity' conference, organized by Jared Kushner, part of a US-led initiative to normalize relations between Israel and regional states without reaching a political solution on Palestine. Gowing expertly steered discussion away from any mention of the Israeli occupation of Palestine, according to Jack Moore, a journalist covering the conference. 'Only God knows how much he was paid,' said Moore.

He is also a Member of Council of the Royal United Services Institute. In April 2014 he announced he would be semi-retiring from the BBC.

Gowing founded the Thinking the Unthinkable project in 2014.

== Personal life and early career ==
Nik Gowing is the son of Professor Margaret Gowing, author of the two volume work Independence and Deterrence: Britain and Atomic Energy, 1945–52, who died in 1998. After attending grammar schools in London and Canterbury, Gowing read geography at the University of Bristol.

At university, he worked on local radio; he then joined Thomson Regional Newspapers in Newcastle.

== Published work ==
- The Wire, Hutchinson (31 May 1988), ISBN 978-0-09-167370-3

A novel about the infiltration of the secret police into Poland's Solidarity movement, based on Gowing's extensive knowledge of Solidarity's activities.

- The Loop, Hutchinson (5 Aug 1993), ISBN 978-0-09-174991-0

A thriller, again based on Gowing's first-hand journalistic experience, set in the new Russia. A highly-decorated KGB colonel, who fought to defend the communist system, must survive in a world of turmoil and anarchy.

- "Real-time media is changing our world: Cheap 'go-anywhere' cameras and phones are challenging the credibility of governments, corporations and the traditional media." The Guardian, 11 May 2009
- Skyful of Lies & Black Swans, 2009, Reuters Institute for the Study of Journalism
- Thinking the Unthinkable: A new imperative for leadership in the digital age (John Catt Educational, 8 Jun. 2018) ISBN 1911382748, co-authored with Chris Langdon
