= SuRe =

SuRe (The Standard for Sustainable and Resilient Infrastructure) is a global voluntary standard which integrates key criteria of sustainability and resilience into infrastructure development and upgrade. It has been developed by the Swiss Global Infrastructure Basel Foundation and the French bank Natixis.

The aim of the standard is twofold: it not only guides project owners to develop infrastructure projects that perform highly with regard to sustainability and resilience aspects — taking into account social, environmental and governance criteria and best practices; it also serves as a tool to communicate the sustainability and resilience benefits to potential investors, thus channelling more financial flows into infrastructure development and boosting sustainable socioeconomic development globally. The Standard was launched at 2015 United Nations Climate Change Conference (COP21).

SuRe® is governed by three bodies (Secretariat, Standard Committee and Stakeholder Council) in an effort to maintain a balanced representation of stakeholders in the standard development and provide transparent and due process safeguards while ensuring independence, transparency and credibility.

GIB has also developed the SuRe® SmartScan, a simplified version of the SuRe® Standard which serves as a self-assessment tool for infrastructure project developers. It provides them with a comprehensive and time-efficient analysis of the various themes covered by the SuRe® Standard, offering a solid foundation for projects that are planning to become certified by the SuRe® Standard in the future. Upon completion of the SmartScan, project developers receive a spider diagram evaluation, which indicates their project’s performance in the different themes and benchmarks the performances with other SmartScan assessed projects.
