= Sustainable implant =

Sustainable implant is an urban typology that acts as a decentralized infrastructure provision hub on the neighborhood or district scale. Sustainable implants provide integrated infrastructure services that maintain cycles of energy, water and material, as well as provides social and economic returns. The concept originates from Arjan van Timmeren's research, Autonomy & Heteronomy (2006), as an answer to the problem of scale versus innovation in infrastructure; wherein infrastructure benefits from increasing returns to scale but suffer from extremely slow rate of change and turnover. To answer this problem, the sustainable implant is an instrument for mid-scale facilitation of alternative system innovation. The sustainable implant is a synthesis of techniques for sustainable processing of urban flows within an ecological processing device. The objective of a sustainable implant is to generate qualitative and quantitative improvements for utility service provision.

A sustainable implant cannot be regarded as a fixed design that can be repeated. The device comprises a guiding principle for a sustainable solution to the mainly non-sustainable flows in new or existing neighborhoods making use of E. F. Schumacher's appropriate technology, matching technology to need. The sustainable implant facilitates the joint performance of the community as a cognitive agent within transition processes into sustainable development. On a neighborhood or district level, the Sustainable Implant entails the design of a more sustainable main structure for the transportation of water, wastewater, nutrients, energy, materials and/or waste.

The sustainable implant is matched to the social culture, the micro-climate, and the client's ambitions. The technical morphology the Sustainable Implant is formulated by comparing relevant alternatives against the conventional approach. The maintenance of clean urban cycles (via the sustainable implant's integrated infrastructure approach) is analyzed to prove the fulfillment of the sustainability ambition. Beyond technocracy, the Sustainable Implant is to be socially calibrated and economically profitable.

== Development of the sustainable implant concept ==
The sustainable implant originated from the desire to find harmony between autarky and returns to scale in the field of infrastructure by means of decentralization of utility provision on an appropriate scale such that a more sustainable urban development can be achieved. In contrast to sustainable architecture, the sustainable implant is related to the flow of materials and energy through the built environment. A sustainable implant will often use decentralized sanitation and reuse for enhanced reuse of water, energy and nutrients, and waste.

In his research, Arjan van Timmeren formulated the following five questions:

- To what extent are the current technical (infra)structures decisive for the possibilities and impossibilities of sustainable development?
- Can the central or decentralized solution of the essential flows generate further processes of preservation at a higher scale level?
- Is there an optimal scale for self-sufficiency per flow, and, if there is, what is this optimal scale?
- To what extent can user participation and involvement increase by solving sustainability issues?
- Should the various techniques for the optimization of the flows be combined in one device and can this be done, or should they be integrated separately into existing (infra)structures or buildings?

It is of importance to recognize the need for connection or interconnection with networks at higher scale levels. In fact, the pursuit of full closure or "autarky" even counteracts the principle of the "external economies of scale". By contrast, the arrangement of the cluster within the larger network can respond to a wish for self-sufficiency, creating some sort of a "quasi-autarky", with as a direct advantage the use as a fall-back scenario of the increasing dependence on other areas, countries or even continents.

Such an alternative network principle can also help breaking through the historical relations between the internal organization within the organizations themselves, and the connections to each other and to the more general social structures in the specific localities.

== Criteria for sustainable implants ==
There are three groups of sustainable implant criteria: environmental, spatial, and user-related.

Category	Criteria	Description
Environmental	Maintains cycles as much as possible	Maximizes the reuse of flows of material, energy and nutrients. The desired effect is to limit the amount of inputs from outside the system and reduce the amount of non-reusable refuse exiting the system.
Environmental	Security and consistency of supply	Infrastructure services are free from maintenance and disturbances, with back-up systems where necessary.
Environmental	Minimum added raw materials	Infrastructure processes use minimum chemicals and additives from outside. The construction of the physical infrastructure is wise in choice of materials.
Environmental	Minimum pollution of soil, air, ground area and surface water	Infrastructures and processes do not emit pollutants nor do they leak pollutants.
Environmental	Maximum guarantee of hygiene and safety	The Sustainable Implant is free from risks and threats to physical safety, clean and hygienic facility, and no perceived risks by society.
Environmental	Minimum energy use and maximum renewable energy generation	Collection, transportation and processing of Sustainable Implant components uses minimum energy while energy harvest is maximized.
Environmental	Resilience to sabotage/incorrect use	Systems are robust and designed for apathetic and malignant users.
Environmental	Future value	The sustainable implant has the capacity to evolve by remaining flexible in order to not become obsolete.
Spatial	Optimizes collection and transport	Collection and transport of flows in the neighborhood (water, wastewater, solid refuse, &c.) is maximized regarding space, energy and material. Spatial consequences are determined by transportation techniques and clustering of processes.
Spatial	Minimizes / optimizes use of materials	Building materials are demountable and the Sustainable Implant structure is flexible and easy to manipulate.
Spatial	Adaptation and extension	The Sustainable Implant can add/remove processes and expand/shrink capacity of processes.
Spatial	Screening off against sabotage and vandalism	The Sustainable Implant as well as the connections between the Implant and the neighborhood are impenetrable to sabotage, while remaining visible.
Spatial	Optimized land use	The footprint of the building is minimized. Systems dependent upon sunlight are appropriately positioned. Loading docks, access space, and nuisance zones are optimized.
Spatial	Fitting into the living environment	Health, safety, noise nuisance, vibrations, visual nuisance, and odor risks are eliminated such that the Sustainable Implant fits into an urban setting.
Spatial	Accessibility of parties involved	The Sustainable Implant is permeable by control groups, managers, maintenance staff, and educational tours. Processes are tangible from a distance while being out-of-reach by unauthorized persons.
Spatial	Aesthetic quality	Beauty is a criterion for a building's lasting success.
User-related	Equal or more comfort	The infrastructure and connections within homes are odor-free, robust, easy-to-use, quiet, and unimposing.
User-related	Similar costs	The return on investment, maintenance, and management costs of the Sustainable Implant are equal to or less than with conventional infrastructure, inclusive of costs related to developing buildings connected to the Sustainable Implant.
User-related	Equal or greater ease of use	Users must be confronted with an equally easy or easier specific use of their home installations as well as maintenance rituals.
User-related	Independence of specialized institutions and obligatory networks	The users are shareholders in the Sustainable Implant and independent of larger cooperations which they cannot control, thus inhabitants have personal development possibilities and a hand in their own futures.
User-related	Image and transparency	Sense-ability, monitoring, feedback, and visual recognition of the Sustainable Implant and the processes are maximized; this leads to a rational and efficient use of resources and enhances the joyousness and usability of otherwise invisible infrastructure.

== Examples of Sustainable Implants ==
=== EVA Lanxmeer ===
A Sustainable Implant was designed (but not yet realized) for the EVA Lanxmeer site. The Sustainable Implant in that case featured biogassification of organic waste, community composting, and parking facilities. Programmatically and physically, the Sustainable Implant connected to a hotel and spa, which utilized the rest warmth.

=== Flintenbreite, Lubeck ===
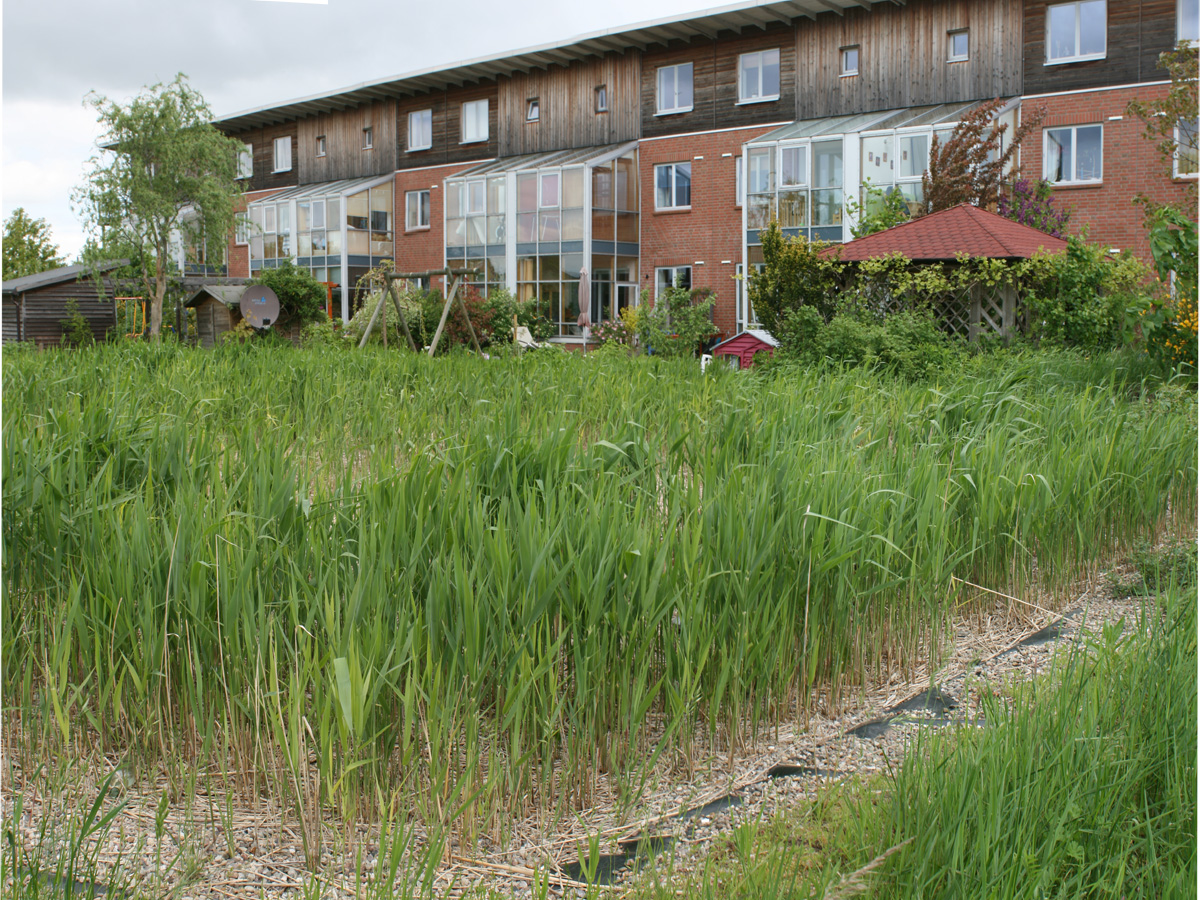
Constructed wetland in the Flintenbreite neighborhood.

The Flintenbreite neighborhood is a market-driven project emphasizing innovative infrastructure services for energy efficiency. In 1999, a portion of the dwellings (for 111 inhabitants) and a technical building with a community center were constructed. Eleven years later, the remaining planned buildings for a total of 350 inhabitants have still not been built due to the poor housing market. The site is on a greenfield on the periphery of Lübeck with good public transportation access and a local primary school.

Notable elements in Flintenbreite are separation of blackwater, greywater, and stormwater; vacuum sewer and anaerobic digestion of organic refuse; and a local integrated infrastructure provision company. The local infrastructure company provides electricity, heat, water and wastewater service from one technical building. The technical building is the hub of infrastructure provision. All of the machines are hidden in the basement and in the back of the ground level. The rest of the ground level is the community center, consisting of a large room, an alcove with a kitchenette, an outdoor patio, and bathrooms. The inhabitants have adapted the center for their needs over time.

The infrastructure is supplied to the rows of dwellings in a compact concrete connection (1.5 meters by 0.3 meters), including the hot water, hot water return, vacuum sewer (63 mm pipe diameter), drinking water, electricity, and telecom.

==== Construction and operation ====
The investment for neighborhood infrastructure and the technical building with a community space was made by the integrated infrastructure provider, the independent company Infranova GmbH & Co KG. The building construction was done by one developer (Schutt) and the vacuum system was built by Roediger Vacuum GmbH, who also supplied the vacuum toilets. The neighborhood was built without any government subsidies, except for a planning subsidy given to OtterWasser GmbH for designing the separated water system. The homes are available at market price, and may even be slightly lower than market price, given the amount of green space surrounding and location adjacent to a primary school.

Impressively, Infranova GmbH is able to provide service for 20% less than conventional suppliers. This is attributed to the integration of the infrastructure provision. The economic success as well as the ecological success of the project is a positive case study for the Sustainable Implant and the Erasmusveld Energy BV.

Infranova GmbH employs one full-time caretaker who had previous experience as a hotel caretaker, so he is familiar with HVAC systems. The owner of Infranova is Ralph Otterpohl, whose company OtterWasser conceptualized the neighborhood. The inhabitants can be stakeholders in Infranova for a one-time fee of €350.00. As stakeholders, they have a vote on community issues but do not share any profits. In fact, Infranova is not run as a profit business; it simply keeps the cost of infrastructure services as low as possible. The residents profit from the more intimate relationship with their infrastructure provider. OtterWasser is called upon 2–3 times a week for conversations about the neighborhood regarding issues not related to infrastructure, such as gardening tips. Generally, inhabitants are proud of their neighborhood and the infrastructure.

The organization of Flintenbreite offers an important case study for Erasmusveld. The practical data generated in its first eight years of operation gives an indication of what can be expected if a similar system is applied in Erasmusveld. For example, the amount of blackwater in a vacuum sewer (6 liters/capita per day), concentration of nutrients in the wastewater, the energy used in operating the vacuum sewer (45 kWh/capita per year), and the socio-technical operation of a combined community center and technical building.

==== Infrastructure services ====
Energy: Households are supplied with warmth from natural gas cogeneration turbine housed in the technical building through a local heat network. The heat network makes a ring through the neighborhood. At each block, the local heat network passes through a heat exchanger to warm drinking water for household use and space warming. The technical building is also an intermediary between the national electricity and gas grid and the households.

Water provision: All water consumed is drinking water from the municipality.

Wastewater: Greywater is collected in the households and brought to a constructed wetland by free-flow pipes. The constructed wetlands are vertical-flow type built at 2 m2 per person. The effluent is cleaner than that of the municipal wastewater treatment plant. Blackwater is collected by the vacuum sewer into the technical building. The final effluent will be a liquid fertilizer which can be reuse in agricultural processes.

Solid refuse: Separated refuse and mixed refuse are handled in the manner conventional to Lubeck; namely by curb side bins collected weekly by trash truck. Organic refuse is collected within the neighborhood in a separate container and can be manually added to the anaerobic digestion process to produce additional energy.

==== Long-term issues ====
Minor problems have occurred with the vacuum sewer. In the first two months there was an adjustment period for inhabitants' behavior. After this period, errors continued to be caused by clogging of the vacuum valve by inappropriate refuse in the toilet. OtterWasser has suggested that this problem could be solved by repetition of information to the inhabitants.

Long-term build up from the precipitation of struvite and carbonate in the pipes has also needed to be solved by treatment with hydrochloric acid once in five years. The toilets installed are still functioning well, but are considered too noisy. However, since installation eleven years ago, Roediger has improved their technology to make quieter toilets.

The constructed wetlands for greywater purification are performing exceedingly well, even after so many years and even in the winter. Due to the warmth of the greywater, there has been no freezing in the settling tank or in the wetland itself and Lubeck's climate is quite severe.

The other decentralized infrastructure, including the gas CHP, hot water network, storm water infiltration, and community center have performed without any noted difficulties. Socially, there has been a positive response to the development, including pride over the infrastructure and adaptive use of the community center.

In conclusion, Flintenbreite is a successful case decentralized infrastructure services, notably including the vacuum sewer, which is viewed with skepticism by many. Infranova GmbH further shows the management of decentralized infrastructure can be economically sustainable and with a simple organizational structure.

Lessons learned:

- A local integrated infrastructure provider can be economically sustainable.
- A vacuum sewer can be successful in a neighborhood, though small technical problems can be expected during the adjustment period.
- Constructed wetlands are a practically proven robust and effective method of treating greywater in a Northern European context.
- Market parties can also be drivers for decentralized infrastructure communities.
- Decentralized infrastructure and a community center are socially sustainable.

=== Kolding Wastewater Pyramid ===
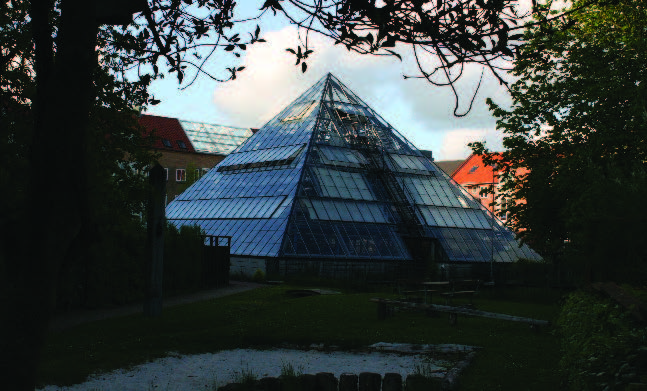
Wastewater purification pyramid in Kolding, Denmark.

As part of an urban renewal project in 1995, the City of Kolding constructed an impressive decentralized wastewater cleansing operation and glass pyramid within a city block in downtown Kolding. It is an older pilot project, so the long term consequences can be seen.

==== Construction and operation ====
The pyramid and surround infrastructure was built by the City of Kolding as a pilot project. Once finished, it was given to the inhabitants of the block as a gift. The residents continue to use the pyramid to purify their wastewater, but all other functions it was planned to serve has ceased. Of the 120 homes it serves, only 30 are occupied by their owners, and the rest are rented. The organization of owners bills for wastewater treatment the same as the municipal wastewater treatment plant would. In fact, the pyramid purifies water for less money than the WWTP. The regular maintenance for wastewater treatment is performed by a landscaping company who also looks after the green space within the block. Once a week, a staff member checks all of the gauges to make sure the system is working properly. Once a year, all of the pumps are maintained by a technical company. In the event of a problem, the landscaping company is alarmed and comes to fix it. In the case of damages to the system, such a broken pump or broken window, the organization of owners pays for replacement.

Operationally, the largest problem is odor, which is a serious nuisance to the inhabitants. The aeration pond is an open system, and continually smells like sewerage, the strength of which varies from day to day depending upon the weather.

==== Infrastructure services ====
Energy: To support the decentralized wastewater system, a bank of solar PV panels were installed above a parking area. However, it does not provide enough energy to compensate for the entire operation.

Water provision: Besides drinking water, rainwater is harvested from building roofs. It flows down gutters into a storage tank inside the block. From there it is pumped through a simple fabric filter into the homes for toilet flushing and a washing machine. One difficulty has been slightly dirty water after a long period of no rain in which dust settles on the roofs. Then, that first rainwater is a bit darker, and almost every time complaints are made. The solution is further filtration of the rainwater before use, or education of the inhabitants that the water may be clouded. In the driest part of the year, the rainwater must be supplemented with drinking water.

Wastewater: Decentralized sanitation of wastewater is the most import element of the scheme. Blackwater and greywater are collected together inside the block by use of a normal sewer into a buffer tank. From there, the sludge is settled out, which is removed and treated in the municipal WWTP, so not all parts of the wastewater stream are treated in the neighborhood. The remaining liquid fraction of the wastewater passes through a series of reactors for aeration, clarifying, and purification with ozone and ultraviolet light. After this last step, the cleaned wastewater enters the pyramid, where it was meant for irrigation and supporting tilapia fish. However, both of these functions have ceased. Finally, after the pyramid, the wastewater is infiltrated into surface water.

Solid refuse: Inside the block, the inhabitants have drop-off facilities for mixed refuse, glass, paper, problem refuse (chemical, metal, batteries, &c), and organic refuse. The drop-off bins are housed within well designed closets for easy use with good instructions and green roofs. The municipal refuse collection company removes the refuse from bins within the closet. Organic refuse is collected in a series of 1 m3 boxes in the block. At any time, only one box is unlocked. When it is full, the next box is opened and the full box is locked. At the end of the year, all of the boxes are removed and composted to create fertilizer by the caretaker company hired for maintenance. It is a simple solution that works well except for the high level plastic bags used which pollute the refuse stream.

==== Long-term issues ====
The pyramid continues to perform its main function of water purification, however, it is very noticeable that the inhabitants have lost interest in the pyramid. Four levels in the pyramid were planned as greenhouse space for the inhabitants; now it is only partially used by one hobbyist gardener (at no cost), while most of the greenhouse beds sit empty. This can also be seen beside the pyramid, where a piece of land was set aside for urban agriculture and now sits unused. At the base of the pyramid, there are three water ponds in a cascade which hosted tilapia fish when it was constructed, but now only support algae. According to the caretaker, the problem is three-fold: firstly, the community has changed from owners to renters, and the renters have no long-term invested interest in utilizing the space provided; second, no professional cultivator can use the greenhouse because it is too small with too many stairs; third, the pyramid is a repetition of service, because almost every apartment is equipped with its own small glass-enclosured patio in which small plants can also be grown with more convenience.

Lessons learned:

- Decentralized purification of wastewater can be provided at a lower cost than with municipal WWTP.
- The operational efficiency in wastewater treatment is influenced by the spatial arrangement of tanks to reduce the number of pumps (and electricity) used.
- Provision of rainwater on the block scale is feasible with few problems in the long-term.
- If a greenhouse is built, long-term participation by inhabitants cannot be guaranteed, so it is preferable that the space is interesting for a professional gardener or cafe or other party.
- Wastewater treatment in an urban setting must be performed in a closed container to prevent odor problems.
