= Global Infrastructure Basel Foundation =

Swiss urban infrastructure foundation

Global Infrastructure Basel Foundation (GIB) is an independent, not-for-profit foundation under Swiss law active in the field of sustainable urban infrastructure. The CEO of GIB is Louis Downing.

== Activities ==
GIB supports various stakeholders such as governments, banks, and cities, in the designing, implementing, and financing of infrastructure projects at all stages of the project cycle. Currently, the foundation particularly works on:

- The SuRe Standard – The Standard for Sustainable and Resilient Infrastructure: a global voluntary ISEAL standard, developed in cooperation with the French bank Natixis that integrates key criteria of sustainability and resilience into infrastructure development and upgrade;
- a Resilience and Sustainability Credit Rating;
- Capacity building services to enable infrastructure developers, financiers, and public sector actors to develop the skills and knowledge necessary to create green infrastructure; and
- consultancy and tailored services to municipalities and their stakeholders.

GIB also organizes the GIB Sustainable Infrastructure Summit and is regularly asked to provide input at sustainable infrastructure events.

GIB has also developed the SmartScan, an infrastructure self- assessment tool that provides a rapid assessment of an infrastructure project against sustainability and resilience criteria covering Environmental, Social and Governance (ESG) issues.

== Publications ==
GIB and UNEP Inquiry have partnered to publish the often-cited working paper "Sustainable Infrastructure and Finance" (published 2016). In August 2016, GIB and the UN Global Compact Cities Programme signed a Memorandum of Understanding with a view to developing synergies and collaboration as well as sharing knowledge and expertise on a range of topics.

== Organisational affiliations ==
GIB is supported by the Swiss Government and many other partners, such as WWF, ICLEI and the European Investment Bank. GIB is an Observer of the Green Bond Principles. Since 2016, GIB is member of the Steering Committee of the Cities Climate Finance Leadership Alliance (CCFLA), which was launched at the United Nations Secretary-General's Climate Summit in September 2014.
