= Better Cities Film Festival =

- Location: Detroit, Michigan
- Founded: 2013 (as New Urbanism Film Festival)
- Festival date: October 5–8, 2023
- Website: bettercitiesfilmfestival.com

The Better Cities Film Festival (formerly New Urbanism Film Festival) is an annual film festival focused on urban planning and design. Founded in 2013 by Joshua Paget, the Festival is based in Detroit.

In 2020 and 2022, the Better Cities Film Festival collaborated with UN-Habitat to showcase films on cities at the Tenth World Urban Forum in Abu Dhabi, United Arab Emirates and the Eleventh in Katowice, Poland.

In February 2024, the festival expanded to Durham, North Carolina in collaboration with Southern Urbanism.
