= Francis Birungi =

Human rights advocate

- Citizenship: Ugandan
- Occupations: Executive Director; Chairperson
- Known for: human rights advocate

Frances Birungi - Odong also known as Francis Birungi is a Ugandan, human rights advocate commonly known for her campaigns to secure women's land and property rights.

She is also known for challenging the gap between Uganda's constitutional property laws and the cultural barriers that leave only about 16% of Uganda women owning land. Her advocacy is also in sexual and reproductive health rights, climate resilience and ending gender based violence.

== Education Background ==
She has a Master of Arts in Human Rights which she earned from Makerere University where she specialized in women's and children's rights. She also has a Bachelor of Arts in Social Sciences which she also earned from Makerere University majoring in Sociology and Social Administration.

== Career ==
She is currently the executive director for the Uganda Community Based Association for Women and Children's Welfare (UCOBAC), where she oversees the direction, policy advocacy and community based welfare programs across Uganda. Before becoming the executive director, she was the programs director at UCOBAC. She is also serving as the Chairperson of the National Land Coalition Uganda, coordinating civil society organisations, researchers and state actors to advocate for gender responsive land governance.

She also leads the Ugandan chapter of the global Stand for Her Land Campaign, working with traditional leaders, local governments, and women to eliminate discriminatory inheritance and land registration practices in Uganda. She also once served as a Policy Unit Expert for the United Nations Habit III conference on housing and sustainable urban developement, helping integrate gender perspectives into the New Urban Agenda, and sat on the national task force evaluating the gender strategy of the Uganda National Land Policy.

== Awards and Recognition ==
She was recognized by the United nations as a Habitat III Policy Unit Expert for her work mainstreaming gender into urban and land governance frameworks.
