= Unlimited Cities =

Unlimited Cities (in French Villes sans limites) are methods and apps to facilitate civil society involvement in urban transformations. Unlimited Cities DIY is an open-source upgrade of the application linked with the New Urban Agenda of the United Nations "Habitat III" Conference.

== Use ==
These apps can be used on mobile devices (tablets and smartphones) for people to express their views on the evolution of a neighbourhood before future developments are outlined by professionals. "Through a simple interface, they make up a realistic representation of their expectations for a given site. Six cursors can be played with: urban density, nature, mobility, neighbourhood life, digital, and creativity/art in the city. Designed by the UFO urban planning agency in partnership with the HOST architectural and urban planning firm, the apps provide upstream information to urban project developers, as well as to people to query their design wishes and thus to appropriate the future project.”. Thus, the Unlimited Cities method gives civil society the opportunity to act and co-construct with professional urban developers without being subject to solutions predetermined by experts and public authorities.

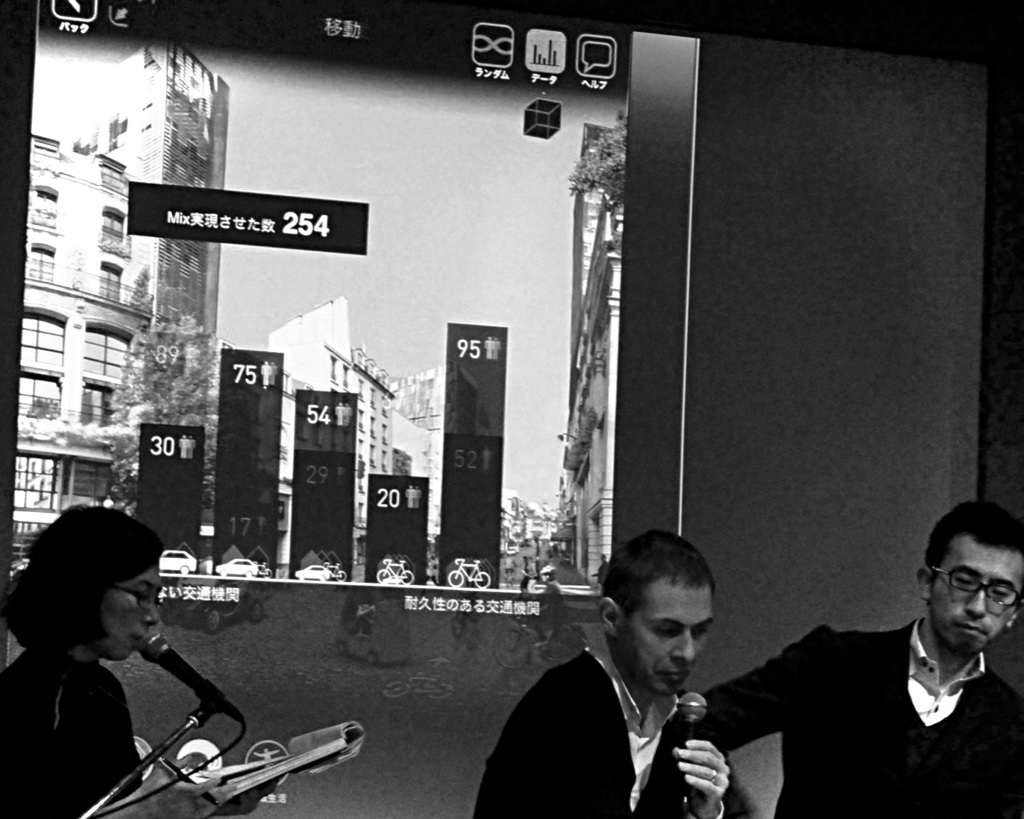
Japan, city of Tokyo, French Institute, November 2011. Unlimited Cities PRO prototype presentation. By Alain Renk and Daisuke Sugawara, architects.

According to one of its creators, the urban architect Alain Renk: "Today the future of cities and metropolises lies less in the poetic, imaginary and solitary techniques found in Jules Verne’s novels than in capacities offered by digital mediations to imagine, represent and openly share knowledge, through the collective intelligence, offering opportunities to consider less standardized and prioritized lifestyles, freer creativity, shorter design and manufacturing circuits of circular economies and, ultimately, preservation of common goods.

== Backgrounds ==
The project originates in 2002 at the Orleans ArchiLab international meetings, with the publication of the book named Construire la Ville Complexe? (Building the Complex City?), published by Jean Michel Place, a well-known editor in the world of architecture. Then, in 2007 with a research using digital urban ecosystem simulators on the Plan Construction Architecture du Ministère du développement durable (Construction Architecture Plan of the Ministry of Sustainable Development). A crossed interview with Alain Renk and the sociologist Marc Augé discusses the possibilities of simulators to operate the collective intelligence.

In 2009, the HOST Agency, responsible for the creation of the Civic-Tech UFO, got the certification of the Cap Digital and Advancity competitiveness clusters to mount the UrbanD collaborative research program, intended to lay the collaborative software theoretical and technical basis for the evaluation and representation of the quality of urban life to enlighten decisions. This 3-year program (from early 2010 to late 2012) was the basis for the creation of "Unlimited Cities", apps and required an 800 000 € budget that was half funded by European Regional Development Fund (ERDF) subsidies.

In June 2011, a beta version of Unlimited Cities PRO is presented in Paris in the Futur en Seine Festival with real-world tests with visitors, then shown in Tokyo in November and in Rio de Janeiro in December of the same year.

On October 2, 2012, the first operational deployment is implemented by the town hall of Rennes,: " the first tests were carried out in the area around the TGV1 train station and the prison demolition site in Rennes, and we discovered that when being able to build what they wanted, users quickly forgot reluctance such as for urban density, and they conceived urban projects that often went against conventional wisdom. The idea of urban density and tall buildings is often rejected, but it is accepted as soon as people can adapt it to their own logic.”.

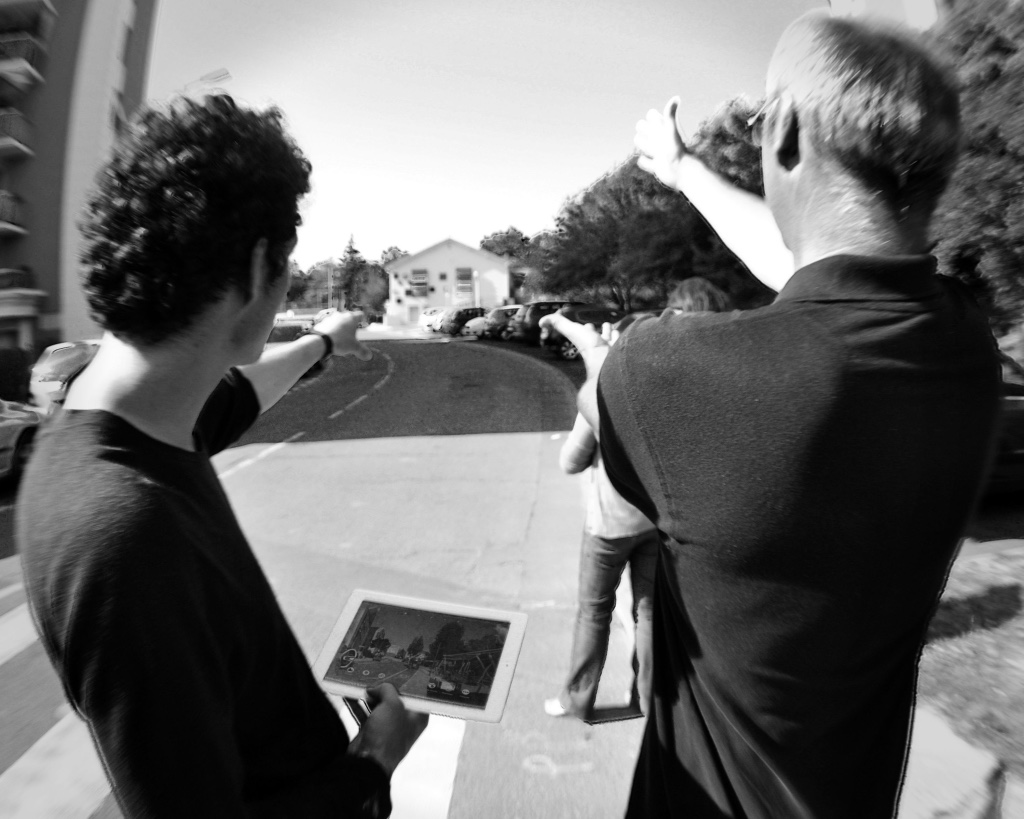
France, city of Montpellier, La Pompignane District, June 2013. Mediation with Unlimited Cities PRO. Local people with JM Bourgogne, digital city director Montpellier and Martin Cahen, Strate designer.

Then the tool was implemented in Montpellier in June 2013. Then in June, July and August in Evreux, where UFO worked on the conversion of the downtown former Saint-Louis Hospital.

In June 2015 in Grenoble, "the application is used to imagine, jointly with the population, solutions to give more visibility to the transport offer. It is a different way of working. We do not turn anymore only to the planners but we directly go to the locals and ask for their opinion, their vision. The purpose is obviously to increase buses utilization, but it is also to have people satisfied with the arrangements put in place. ".

The first cities to use Unlimited Cities PRO highlighted the mediators' ability to approach people in the street, often unprepared, with a tablet. The mediators stayed in the neighbourhoods for several weeks, close to where people live and work. Participation was considerably higher than with conventional consultation methods, which struggle to draw people to designated venues; in Evreux, more than 1,600 people took part. These results interested researchers analysing changes in attitudes among urban professionals and citizens. Researchers have raised several questions about the method: whether it amounts to a revival of participatory democracy, whether its hyperrealistic images are misleading or accessible to all kinds of people, and whether the open-source nature of the collected data and its availability in real time helps build trust between experts and non-experts. The method is the subject of several scientific articles and has received several awards in France, as well as the Open Cities Award from the European Commission.

== UN-Habitat and Unlimited Cities DIY ==
The first requests were initially applied for in Rio, in 2011, for associations to use the software in the favelas, and then recurrently in Africa, South America and India. In parallel associations and groups in Europe also wanted to be free to implement, in their territories and independently, the collaborative urban planning device without needing further financing than users’ support. In June 2013 the Civic-Tech UFO presented at the festival Futur en Seine the Unlimited Cities DIY prototype: an open source, free and easy to implement upgrade. Presentations of the beta version are then non-stop: September 2013 Nantes for Ecocity symposium; November 2013, Barcelona in the Open Cities Award Ceremony; January 2014 Rennes for a meeting at the Institute of Urbanism, March 2014 Le Havre at a conference of Urbanism collaboration; May 2014 London in the Franco-British symposium on Smart-Cities; July 2014 Berlin for the Open Knowledge Festival; early October 2014 Hyderabad, India for Congress Metropolis; late October 2014 Wuhan, China for the conference of the Sino-French ecocity Caiden; 2015 Wroclaw for the Hacking of the Social Operating System; September 2015, Lyon at the annual conference of the national Federation Planning Agencies and many other workshops that confirmed recurring applications for an open-source version easy to implement.

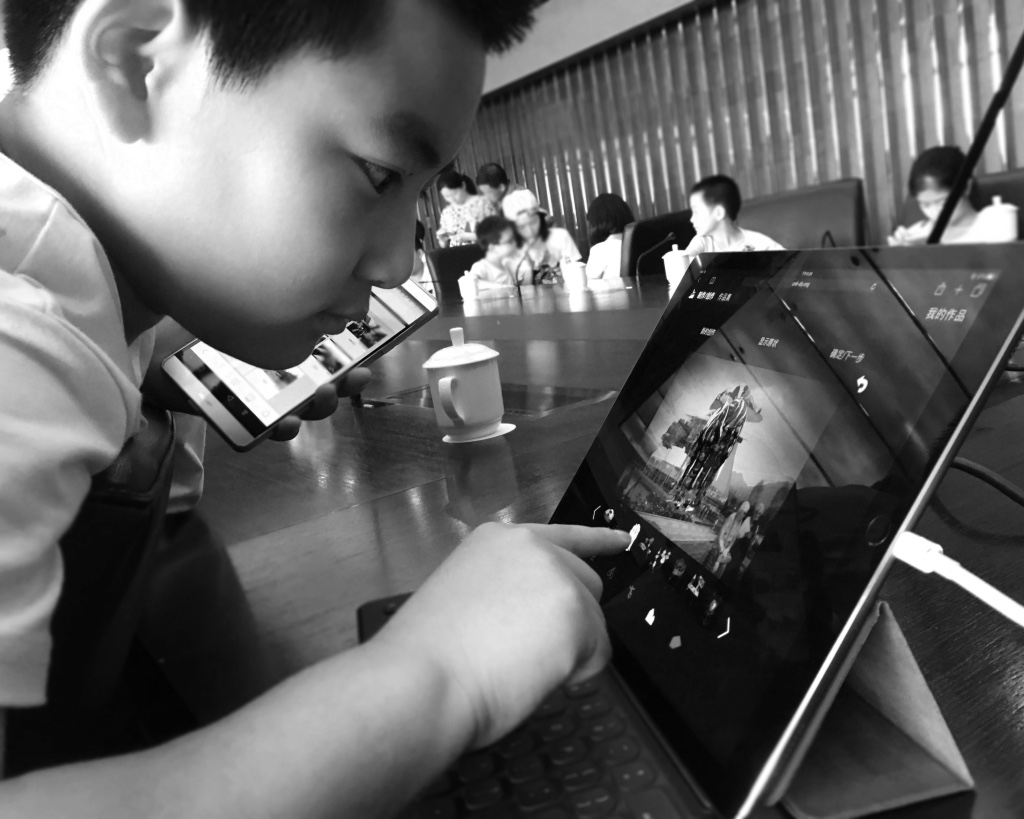
China, city of Wuhan, Huashan suburb, May 2016. Co-conception with Unlimited Cities DIY. Children of Natur project, Mu Wei, Sam Cho and Yu Hui architects.

2016 has been showing a strong acceleration of the open-source version expansion because several workshops were organized with the University of Lyon in April to redesign the campus of the Central School (Wikibuilding-campus project), and then again in China several conferences and use of the software with farmers (Wikibuilding-Village project), with children (project Wikibuilding Natur), and with students and faculty of the University of Wuhan HUST.

The first contacts between the agency UN-Habitat and Unlimited Cities DIY software were held in October 2014 in Hyderabad with the City Resilience Profiling Program and then in Barcelona in 2015. The connection is concretized in the following Habitat III Conference. Held every twenty years, Habitat conferences organized by the UN form a sounding board that accelerates the consideration of major urban issues in public policy. This year 2016, the preparatory document for the Habitat III Conference in Quito highlights the need to evolve towards urban planning construction carried together with civil society. The non-profit organisation "7 Milliards d'urbanistes (7 billion urban planners) " will be present in Quito to introduce the open source Unlimited Cities DIY software to delegates of the 197 countries member for collaborative urban planning to become available to the greatest possible number of people.

== Honours and awards ==
In 2015, the Wikibuilding project designed for the future Paris Rive gauche is preselected under the contest "Réinventer Paris."

- 2013 Winner of Printemps du numérique (Rural TIC)
- 2013 Winner of Territoires innovants (Interconnected)
- 2013 Winner of Open Cities Awards (European Commission)
- 2011 Winner of the call for projects for Futur en Seine (Cap digital)
- 2011 Nominee of the 2011 Prix de la croissance verte numérique Award (Acidd)
- 2010 Selection of the Carrefours Innovations&Territoires (CDC)

== Publications ==
- (fr) Créer virtuellement un urbanisme collectif by Julie Nicolas and Xavier Crépin, Le Moniteur - N°5813, April 2015.
- (fr) L’urbanisme collaboratif, expérience et contexte by Nancy Ottaviano, GIS Symposium Participation.
- (fr) Clément Marquet, Nancy Ottaviano and Alain Renk, « Pour une ville contributive », Urbanisme dossier "Villes numériques, villes intelligentes?", Autumn 2014, p. 53-55.
- (fr) L’appropriation de la ville par le numérique by Clément Marquet : Undergoing Thesis, Institut Mines Telecom.
- (fr) Et si on inventait l’enquête d’imagination publique? by Sylvain Rolland, La Tribune hors-série Grand-Paris.
- (fr) Villes sans limite, un outil pour stimuler l’imagination publique by Karim Ben Merien and Xavier Opige, Les Cahiers de l’IAU idf
- (fr) Wikibuilding : l’urbanisme participatif de demain ? by Ludovic Clerima, Explorimmo, 2015
- Alain Renk, Urban Diversity: Cities Of Differences Create Different Cities, in WorldCrunch.com, November 12, 2013 (visited on May 28, 2016)
- (fr) Philippe Gargov, Samsung et son safari imaginaire : l’urbanisme collaboratif is now mainstream, on pop-up-urbain.com, December 2012 (visited on June 13, 2016)
- July 8, 2011, radio broadcast: Qu’est-ce que la ville numérique? : The field of the possible, France Culture, 2011
