= Habitat Jam =

Online event organized by the UNHSP

Habitat Jam was an online event organized by the United Nations Human Settlements Programme (UN-HABITAT), the Government of Canada and IBM. It was held on December 1-4 2005 to help solve both potential and current problems related to urban areas.

Habitat Jam was created for the World Urban Forum 3 conference, which was held in Vancouver in June 2006. Ideas collected through the Jam were used to help decide on themes and discussion topics for delegates attending the WUF 3 conference. Participation in Habitat Jam was open to public and private-sector organizations and individuals around the world with an interest in urban issues.

== Third Session of the World Urban Forum and the role of Habitat Jam ==
As the population increases, and cities expand, issues such as poverty and access to basic facilities, such as shelter, clean water and sanitation will become harder to manage. World Urban Forum 3 (WUF 3) was designed to bring together those with high relevance to urbanization concerns — such as experts and members of industry — to help adapt and prepare for potential population growth.

As a limited number of individuals can participate in the physical conference in Vancouver, Habitat Jam, was created, which incorporated six forums focused on the following themes:

- Improving the lives of people living in slums
- Sustainable access to water in urban areas
- Environmental sustainability in urban areas
- Finance and governance in urban areas
- Safety and security in urban areas
- Humanity: the future of our cities

== The Jam solution ==
IBM provided an Internet-based, collaborative environment that could accommodate up to 100,000 participants worldwide. The IBM team customized the Jam application, hosted Habitat Jam, provided advice and guidance to the World Urban Forum organization, analyzed the data collected, participated at the conference, and assisted in public relations and marketing activities. IBM had used online Jams internally since 2001 to enable global collaboration among IBMers.

== About UN-HABITAT ==
UN-HABITAT is the United Nations agency for human settlements. It is mandated by the UN General Assembly to promote socially and environmentally sustainable towns and cities, with the goal of providing adequate shelter for all.

== See also ==
- Habitat I
