= Doh Eain =

- ဒို့အိမ်
- Formation: 2017; 9 years ago
- Headquarters: Yangon, Myanmar
- Website: doheain.com

Doh Eain (Burmese: ဒို့အိမ်) is a placemaking social enterprise based in Yangon, Myanmar. Founded by Emilie Röell in 2017, Doh Eain focuses on urban regeneration and heritage conservation, leading projects to clean up trash-filled alleyways for conversion to playgrounds, and restoring heritage apartments. Doh Eain has also led the creation of parks and public spaces in Yangon.

In 2020 during the COVID-19 pandemic, Doh Eain launched a survey of 2,000 street vendors in Yangon to collect data on the city's informal economy, and launched a crowd funding campaign to support street vendors.

Doh Eain works with a range of partners, for example UN-Habitat
