= Habitat III =

2016 United Nation summit on housing

Habitat III, the United Nations Conference on Housing and Sustainable Urban Development, took place in Quito, Ecuador, from 17 to 20 October 2016.

The UN Conferences on Housing (Habitat) are occurring in a bi-decennial cycle (1976, 1996 and 2016). The United Nations General Assembly decided to convene The Habitat III Conference in its resolution 66/207. The Habitat III Conference reinvigorates the global commitment to sustainable urbanization, to focus on the implementation of a “New Urban Agenda”.

Habitat III was one of the first United Nations global summits after the adoption of the Post-2015 Development Agenda. It gave the opportunity to open discussions on important urban challenges and questions, such as how to plan and manage cities, towns and villages for sustainable development. The discussion of these questions shapes the implementation of new global development and climate change goals. In particular, the conference elaborates on Goal #11 of the Sustainable Development Goals: "Make cities and human settlements inclusive, safe, resilient, and sustainable."

== Background ==
Habitat I was the first United Nations Conference on Human Settlements, held in Vancouver, British Columbia, Canada, May 31 - June 11, 1976. At this conference, governments began to recognize the need for sustainable human settlements and the consequences of rapid urbanization, especially in the developing world. The conference outcomes were integrated into the Vancouver Declaration on Human Settlements, which carried an action plan with 64 recommendations for National Action. The Conference also established the United Nations Centre for Human Settlements - UNCHS (Habitat).

Habitat II, the Second United Nations Conference on Human Settlements, was held in Istanbul, Turkey from June 3–14, 1996. The conference outcomes were integrated in the Istanbul Declaration. World leaders also adopted the Habitat Agenda as a global plan of action for adequate shelter for all, with the notion of sustainable human settlements driving development in an urbanizing world.

== Structure ==
=== Secretary-General ===
Joan Clos, the 1997–2006 Mayor of Barcelona and Executive Director of UN-Habitat from 2010 to 2018, was also Secretary-General of the Habitat III.

=== Participants ===
Habitat III invited all Member States and relevant stakeholders, including parliamentarians, civil society organizations, regional and local government and municipality representatives, professionals and researchers, academia, foundations, women and youth groups, trade unions, and the private sector, as well as organizations of the United Nations system and intergovernmental organizations.

About 36,000 people in total attended the conference, which was based at the Casa de la Cultura Ecuatoriana in Quito.

=== Road Map ===
The first session of the Preparatory Committee (PrepCom1) for Habitat III was held in New York, United Nations Headquarters, from 17 to 18 September 2014. The second session of the Preparatory Committee (PrepCom2) for Habitat III was held in Nairobi, Kenya, from 14 to 16 April 2015. The PrepCom3 took place from 25 to 27 July 2016, in Surabaya, Indonesia.

=== Policy reports ===
The process towards Habitat III includes the elaboration of national and regional reports -that will converge in a Global Report- to provide evidence-based knowledge on the implementation of the Habitat Agenda and a comprehensive analysis on the global state of urbanization as well as good practices and tools both at the policy and intervention level.

22 stock taking papers on relevant topics, Habitat III Issue Papers, were developed through a collaborative exercise of the United Nations system coordinated by the Habitat III Secretariat.

A number of official Regional and Thematic High Level Meetings involving a wide range of participants are debating priorities for the New Urban Agenda and policy recommendations in the form of a final participants' declaration. The final declaration from Regional and Thematic meetings will be considered official inputs to the Habitat III process.

A total of 10 policy papers on relevant topics will be developed by Policy Units composed of 20 experts each, coming from different geographic areas and constituencies.

=== Engagement ===
The debate towards Habitat III is an ongoing process that includes past sessions of the World Urban Forums, especially the last one held in 2014 in Medellín, Colombia, and National Urban Forums to discuss and deliberate on national priority subjects including the preparation of the HIII National Reports. Beyond the governmental participation in the process through the General Assembly, the engagement to the Conference will include the General Assembly of Partners (GAP) to serve as a broad-based deliberative platform for non-governmental partners in order to develop a consensus for a joined outcome document and other related matters for Habitat III. Together Towards Habitat III campaign also promote a Global Citizenship Survey (2015/16) to embrace all contributions on the path to the final outcome of the Conference harvested through activities and initiatives to raise awareness on the New Urban Agenda. At Habitat III, SuRe® – The Standard for Sustainable and Resilient Infrastructure, a global voluntary standard which integrates key criteria of sustainability and resilience into infrastructure development and upgrade, was presented by Global Infrastructure Basel Foundation to the broader public.

== New Urban Agenda ==
The primary goal and outcome of the conference was the agreement by UN member states on the New Urban Agenda (NUA), which will serve as a guideline for urban development for the next twenty years.

A "zero draft" of the New Urban Agenda was released in May 2016 and subsequently edited. The United Nations General Assembly agreed on the final text in September 2016.

The NUA makes frequent references to related UN agreements, including the Rio Declaration on Environment and Development passed in 1992, and the 2030 Agenda for Sustainable Development, the International Guidelines on Urban and Territorial Planning, the Sendai Framework for Disaster Risk Reduction (2015–2030), and the Paris climate agreement, all issued in 2015.

The four mechanisms envisioned for effecting the New Urban Agenda are:

1. National urban policies promoting "integrated systems of cities and human settlements" in furtherance of "sustainable integrated urban development".
2. Stronger urban governance "with sound institutions and mechanisms that empower and include urban stakeholders" along with checks and balances, to promote predictability, social inclusion, economic growth, and environmental protection.
3. Reinvigorated "long-term and integrated urban and territorial planning and design in order to optimize the spatial dimension of the urban form and deliver the positive outcomes of urbanization"; and
4. Effective financing frameworks "to create, sustain and share the value generated by sustainable urban development in an inclusive manner."

=== Urban planning ===
Urban planning is the mechanism by which much of the New Urban Agenda can be accomplished. In particular NUA ¶51 calls for:

urban planning and design instruments that support sustainable management and use of natural resources and land, appropriate compactness and density, polycentrism, and mixed uses, through infill or planned urban extension strategies as applicable, to trigger economies of scale and agglomeration, strengthen food system planning, enhance resource efficiency, urban resilience, and environmental sustainability.

In ¶66 the parties endorse a smart city model:

We commit ourselves to adopting a smart-city approach that makes use of opportunities from digitization, clean energy and technologies, as well as innovative transport technologies, thus providing options for inhabitants to make more environmentally friendly choices and boost sustainable economic growth and enabling cities to improve their service delivery.

=== Right to the city ===
The NUA includes language about a "right to the city", a debated concept referring to popular control over urban processes, but without definite implications for who will prevail when different parties' interests are in conflict.

=== Financing ===
The NUA calls for both public and private financing. Public financing may be derived from the economic gains from urbanization, including land and property value and infrastructure projects. Development funds and development banks are envisioned as "intermediaries for urban financing". (NUA ¶130–153).

Private funding is envisioned especially for real estate and housing; the NUA encourages

the participation of a diverse range of multilateral financial institutions, regional development banks and development finance institutions, cooperation agencies, private-sector lenders and investors, cooperatives, moneylenders and microfinance banks to invest in affordable and incremental housing in all its forms. (NUA ¶140)

== Organizational responses ==
- Luisa Bravo & Mirko Guaralda, of the Queensland University of Technology, with Hendrik Tieben of the Chinese University of Hong Kong, launched the Journal of Public Space on 19 October 2016 at the Habitat III Urban Library. The journal deals with issues related to public space and its influence on culture, behavior, and development.
- The International Urban Development Association (Association Internationale du Développement Urbain, INTA) met on 27–30 November 2016 for one of a series of 18 "Initiative for Habitat III" conferences which began in May 2015. The conference discussed implementing the New Urban Agenda, emphasizing the importance of local governments and non-governmental organizations.
- A group of Multilateral Development Banks (African Development Bank, Asian Development Bank, CAF – Development Bank of Latin America and the Caribbean, European Bank for Reconstruction and Development, European Investment Bank, Inter-American Development Bank Group, Islamic Development Bank, and the World Bank Group) issued a joint statement in support of Habitat III and committing to "support the implementation of the UN's New Urban Agenda through direct financing, catalyzing other resources, as well as domestic resource mobilization."

== See also ==
- Agenda 21
- Our Common Future
- Millennium Development Goals
- Sustainable Development Goals
