= Habitat I =

1976 United Nations conference on housing

The term Habitat I refers to the first United Nations Conference on Human Settlements, in Vancouver, British Columbia in Canada, 31 May – 11 June 1976, which was convened by the United Nations as governments began to recognize the magnitude and consequences of rapid urbanization.

On 16 December 1976 the General Assembly adopted resolution 31/109. It took note of the conference report, the Vancouver Declaration on Human Settlements, which carried an action plan with 64 recommendations for National Action. As a further outcome of the conference, in 1977 the General Assembly resolution 36/162 established the United Nations Centre for Human Settlements – UNCHS (Habitat). It designated the Commission on Human Settlements, a functional commission of the Economic and Social Council (ECOSOC), as the governing body.

Habitat II met in Istanbul, Turkey, 3–14 June 1996.

Habitat III met in Quito, Ecuador, from 17 to 20 October 2016.

== The Vancouver Declaration ==
The Vancouver Declaration starts with a preamble stating that "unacceptable human settlements circumstances are likely to be aggravated by inequitable economic growth and uncontrolled urbanization, unless positive and concrete action is taken at national and international levels".

The first action is "to adopt bold, meaningful and effective human settlement policies and spatial planning strategies (...) considering human settlements as an instrument and object of development".

Among the general Principles, the Conference advocated improving the quality of life through more equitable distribution of development benefits, planning and regulating land use, protecting the environment, integrating women and youth, and rehabilitating people displaced by natural and man-made catastrophes. In the Guidelines for action, various elements of a human settlements policy are defined. Focus is placed on harmonious integration, reduction of disparities between rural and urban areas, orderly urbanization, progressive minimum standards and community participation.

The Declaration states that "adequate shelter and services are a basic human right" and that "governments should assist local authorities to participate to a greater extent in national development". The Declaration strongly emphasizes that "the use and tenure of land should be subject to public control".

== The Vancouver Action Plan ==
The substantive outcomes of the first Habitat Conference are a series of 64 recommendations for National Action and a 44-page "Action Plan". These recommendations are organized in six sections. Section A (Settlements policies and strategies), Section B (Settlement Planning), Section C (Shelter, infrastructure and services), Section D (Land) and Section E (Public Participation). (See more at the UN-Habitat Feature/Backgrounder prepared by UN-Habitat in 2006).

== Participants ==
- Lauchlin Currie
- Margaret Mead
- Paolo Soleri
- Buckminster Fuller
- Mother Teresa
- Barbara Ward, Baroness Jackson of Lodsworth
- Pierre Trudeau

== See also ==
- Habitat II
- Habitat Jam
- United Nations Conference on Housing and Sustainable Urban Development (Habitat III)
