= United Nations Human Settlements Programme =

United Nations agency

- Abbreviation: UN-Habitat
- Formation: 1977; 49 years ago
- Type: Programme
- Legal status: Active
- Headquarters: Nairobi, Kenya
- Head: Anacláudia Rossbach
- Parent organization: United Nations
- Website: www.unhabitat.org

The United Nations Human Settlements Programme (UN-Habitat) is the United Nations programme for human settlements and sustainable urban development. It was established in 1977 as an outcome of the first United Nations Conference on Human Settlements and Sustainable Urban Development (Habitat I) held in Vancouver, Canada, in 1976. UN-Habitat maintains its headquarters at the United Nations Office at Nairobi, Kenya. It is mandated by the United Nations General Assembly to promote socially and environmentally sustainable towns and cities with the goal of providing adequate shelter for all. It is a member of the United Nations Development Group. The mandate of UN-Habitat derives from the Habitat Agenda, adopted by the United Nations Conference on Human Settlements (Habitat II) in Istanbul, Turkey, in 1996. The twin goals of the Habitat Agenda are adequate shelter for all and the development of sustainable human settlements in an urbanizing world.

== Overview ==
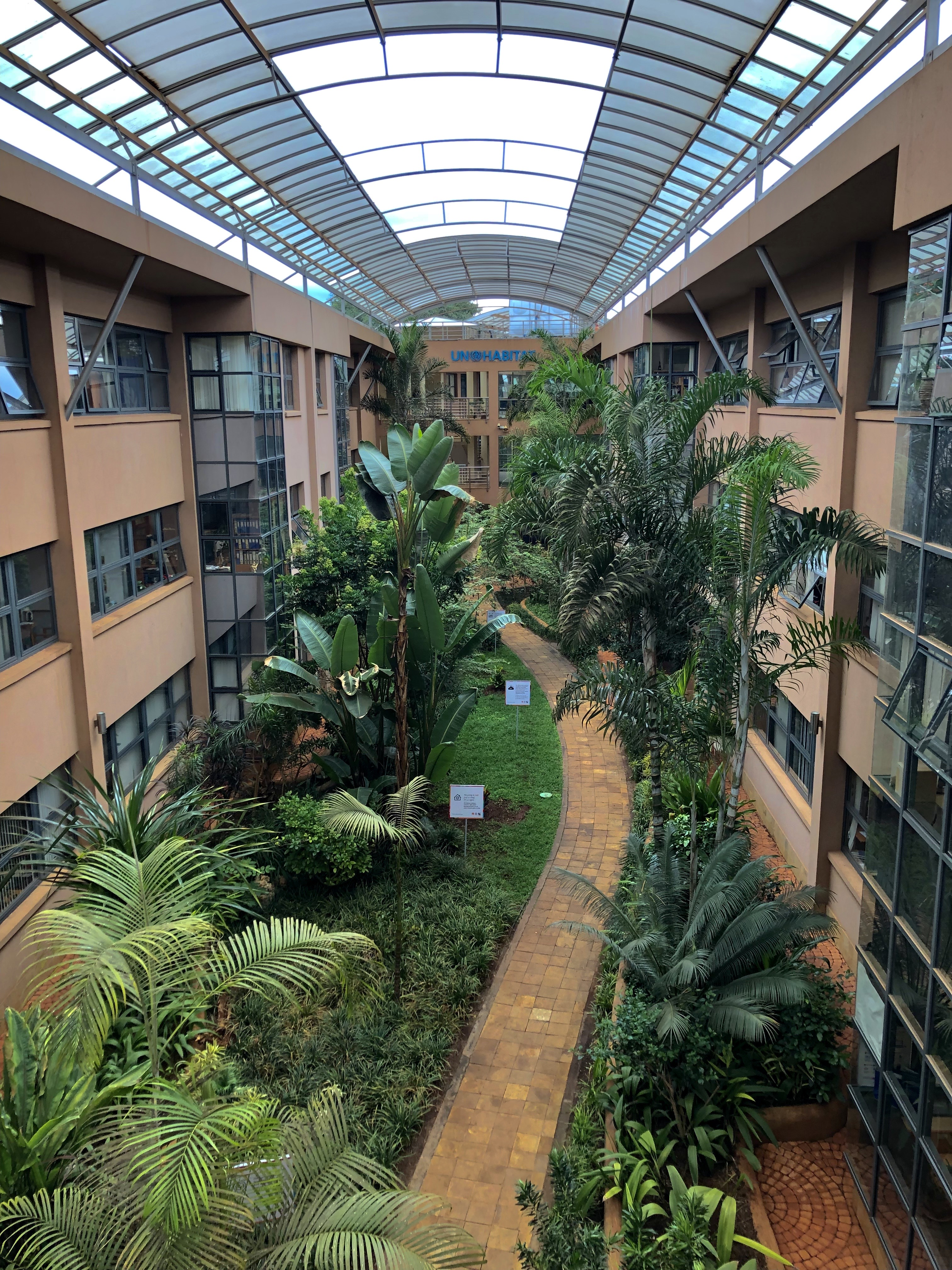
UN-Habitat headquarters at the United Nations Office at Nairobi

The UN-Habitat mandate is also derived from General Assembly resolution 3327 (XXIX), by which the Assembly established the United Nations Habitat and Human Settlements Foundation; resolution 32/162, by which the Assembly established the United Nations Centre for Human Settlements (Habitat); and resolution 56/206, by which the Assembly transformed the Commission on Human Settlements and the United Nations Centre for Human Settlements (Habitat), including the United Nations Habitat and Human Settlements Foundation, into UN-Habitat. The mandate of UN-Habitat is further derived from other internationally agreed development goals, including those contained in the United Nations Millennium Declaration (Assembly resolution 55/2), in particular the target of achieving a significant improvement in the lives of at least 100 million slum-dwellers by 2020; and the target on water and sanitation of the Plan of Implementation of the World Summit on Sustainable Development, which seeks to halve, by 2015, the proportion of people without sustainable access to safe drinking water and basic sanitation. Through Assembly resolution 65/1, Member States committed themselves to continue working towards cities without slums, beyond current targets, by reducing slum populations and improving the lives of slum-dwellers.

== Work and projects ==
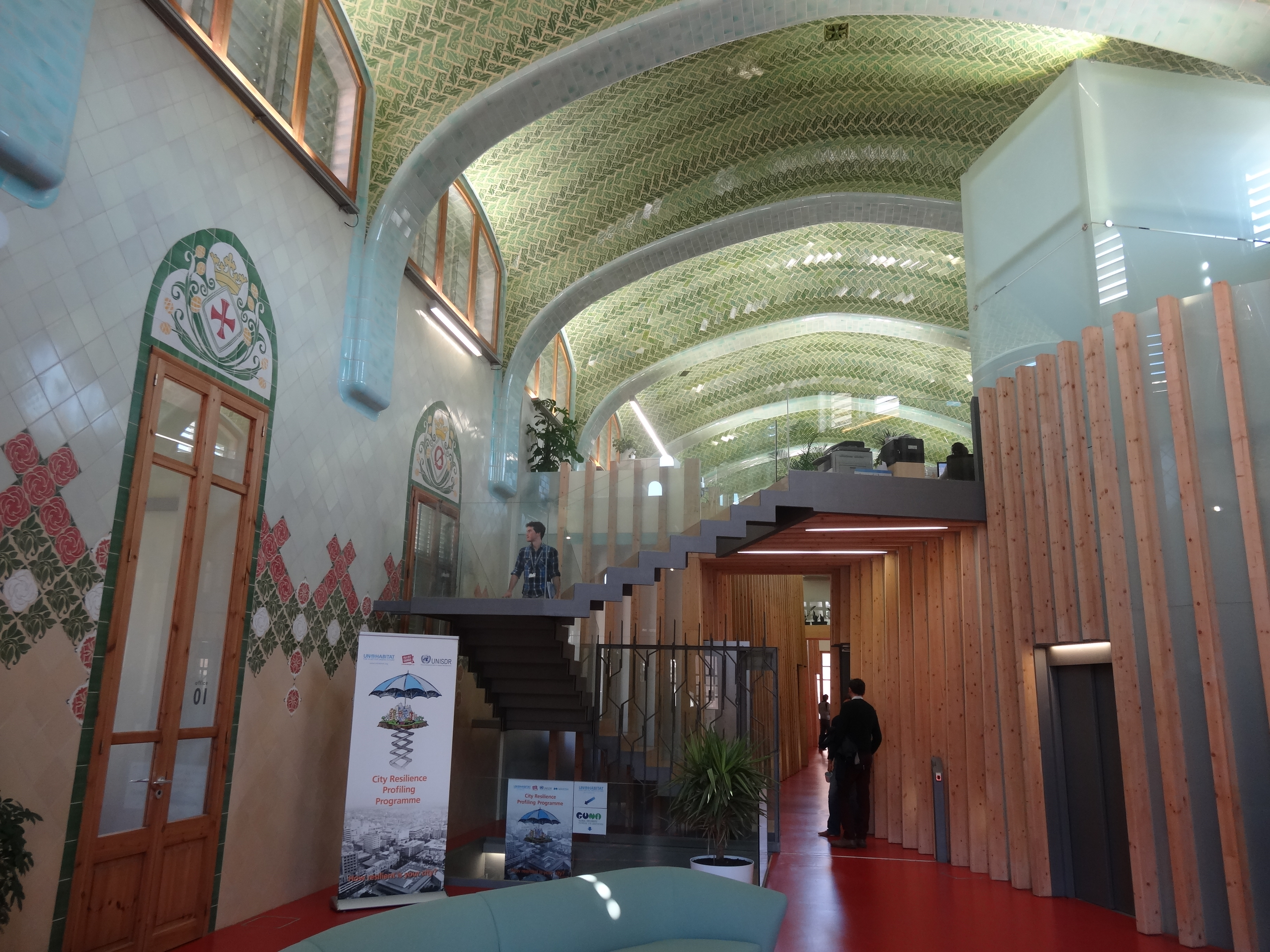
UN-Habitat office in Hospital de la Santa Creu i Sant Pau (Barcelona)

UN-Habitat works in more than 70 countries on five continents focusing on seven areas:

- Urban legislation, land and governance;
- Urban planning and design;
- Urban economy;
- Urban basic services;
- Housing and slum upgrading;
- Risk reduction and rehabilitation;
- Urban research and capacity development.

UN-Habitat works with local partners, for example Doh Eain in Yangon, Myanmar which focuses on urban regeneration and heritage conservation.

== Governance ==
The governance structure of the programme is made up of three decision-making bodies: the UN-Habitat Assembly, an executive board and a Committee of Permanent Representatives. Previously, The Governing Council was the decision-making body for the Programme, but it was dissolved following a resolution passed by the UN General Assembly.

The assembly is a universal body composed of the 193 member states of the United Nations and convenes every four years at the Headquarters of UN-Habitat in Nairobi. The first assembly was held in May 2019. The presidency of the first assembly was held by Mexico. Mexico's presidency was represented by Martha Delgado Peralta the Mexican Undersecretary of Multilateral Affairs and Human Rights.

The second decision-making body of the programme is the executive board, which is made up of 36 member states elected by the UN-Habitat Assembly with representatives from every regional group. The board meets three times annually. The Committee of Permanent Representatives of UN-Habitat (CPR) is composed of all Permanent Representatives accredited to the United Nations Office at Nairobi.

The UN-Habitat secretariat is headed by an executive director nominated by the UN Secretary-General with the approval of the UN General Assembly. The current executive director is Anacláudia Rossbach of Brazil, who was appointed in June 2024. The deputy executive director is Michal Mlynár of Slovakia who was appointed by in December 2022.

=== List of executive directors ===
1. Arcot Ramachandran, India, 1978–1992
2. Elizabeth Dowdeswell, Canada, 1993–1994
3. Wally N’Dow, Gambia, 1994–1997
4. Darshan Johal, Canada, 1997–1998
5. Klaus Töpfer, Germany, 1998–2000
6. Anna Tibaijuka, Tanzania, 2000–2010
7. Joan Clos, Spain, 2010–2018
8. Maimunah Mohd Sharif, Malaysia, 2018–2024
9. Anacláudia Rossbach, Brazil, 2024-

Before 2002, the title of the head of the programme was director of the United Nations Centre for Human Settlements.

== World Urban Forum (WUF) ==
The World Urban Forum was established by the United Nations in 2001 to examine one of the most pressing issues facing the world: rapid urbanization and its impact on communities, cities, economies and climate change. Over the past two decades, the World Urban Forum has evolved into the premier global conference on sustainable urbanization. Convened by the United Nations Human Settlements Programme (UN-Habitat), the forum is a unique non-legislative platform and one of the most inclusive international gatherings on urban issues. The first WUF was held in Nairobi, Kenya in 2002 and has been held around the world ever since. It is organized biennially in different locations around the world.

== World Urban Campaign (WUC) ==
The World Urban Campaign is an initiative led by UN-Habitat that seeks to promote sustainable urban development and livable cities around the world. Its primary objective is to advocate for the implementation of the New Urban Agenda, a global framework adopted by the United Nations in 2016 to guide urban development policies and strategies for the next 20 years. The campaign brings together a diverse range of partners, including governments, civil society organizations, private sector actors, and academic institutions, to collaborate on urban development issues. It focuses on a number of key themes, including affordable housing, sustainable mobility, resilient urban planning, and social inclusion.

== World Habitat Day ==
The United Nations has designated the first Monday of October every year as World Habitat Day. This is an occasion to reflect on the state of our towns and cities and the basic right of all to adequate shelter. It is also intended to remind the world of its collective responsibility for the future of human habitat.

== UN-Habitat Scroll of Honor Award ==
The UN-Habitat Scroll of Honour Award was launched in 1989 and is one of the world's most prestigious human settlements awards. It aims to acknowledge initiatives that have made outstanding contributions in the field of human settlements, provision of housing, highlighting the plight of people living in poverty or who have been displaced, developing and improving human settlements and the quality of urban life to leave no one behind echoing the Sustainable Development Goals 2030 with emphasis on Goal 11: Sustainable Cities and Communities.

== United Nations Advisory Committee of Local Authorities ==
The United Nations Advisory Committee of Local Authorities (UNACLA) was established in 2000 in line with the UN Habitat Governing Council Resolution 17/18 of 1999 as an advisory body to strengthen the dialogue of the UN System with local authorities in relation to the implementation of the Habitat Agenda. In September 2004, UN-HABITAT established a formal relationship with United Cities and Local Governments, which now chairs UNACLA and holds 10 of its 20 seats. UCLG co-hosts the UNACLA secretariat with UN-Habitat.

== Members ==
1. Institute for Housing and Urban Development Studies (IHS)
2. International Institute of Social Studies (ISS)

== See also ==
- Habitat I (1976), Habitat II (1996), Habitat III (2016)
- Right to housing
- Sustainable urbanism
- Urbanization
- World Urban Forum
