= World Urban Forum =

Conference on urban issues

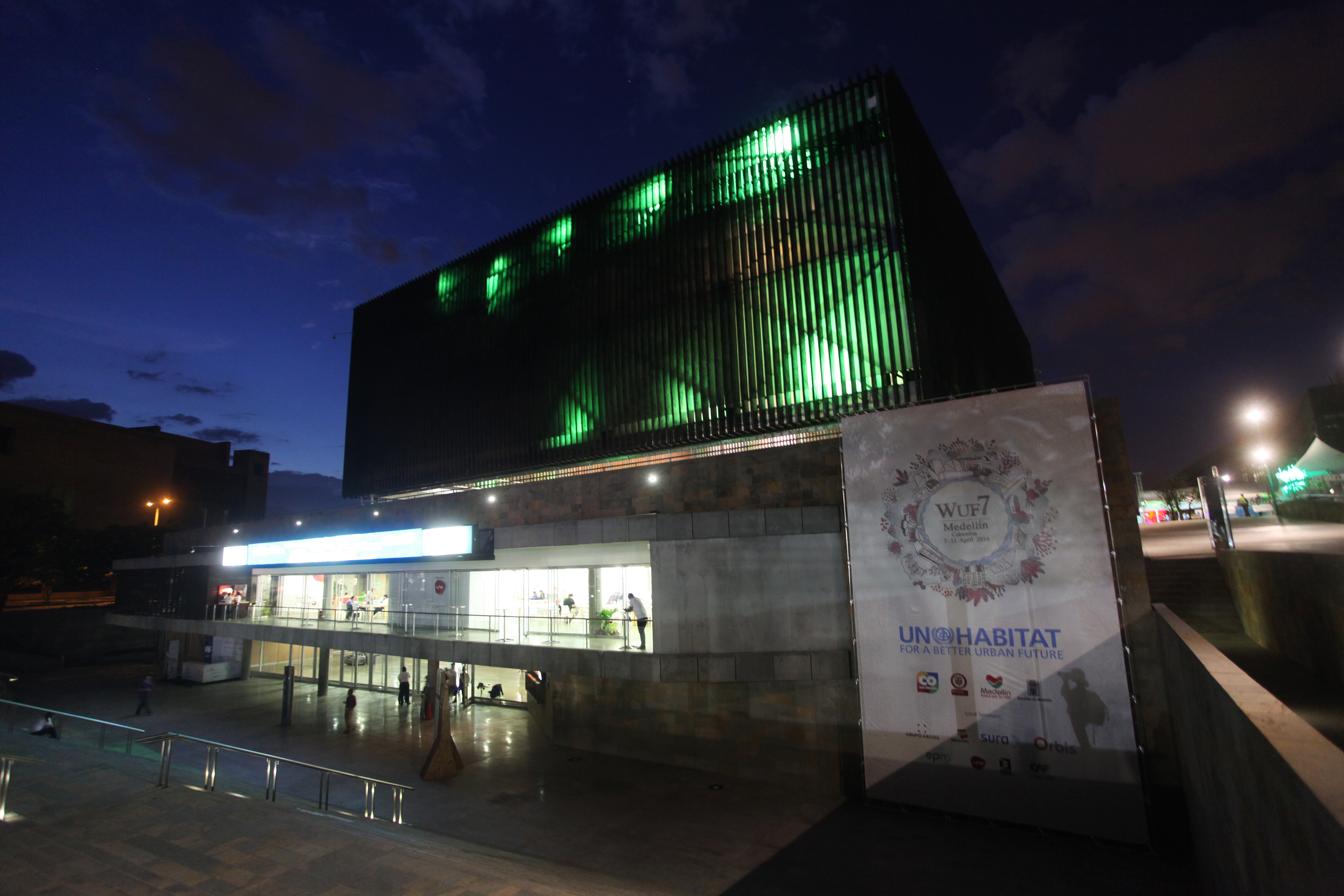
Plaza Mayor in Medellín, Colombia during the seventh World Urban Forum in 2014

The World Urban Forum (WUF) is the world’s premier conference on urban issues. It was established in 2001 by the United Nations to examine one of the most pressing issues facing the world today: rapid urbanisation and its impact on communities, cities, economies, climate change and policy.

The World Urban Forum is organised and run by the United Nations Human Settlements Programme (UN-HABITAT).

== History ==
The first World Urban Forum was held in Nairobi, Kenya in 2002 and has been held around the world ever since.

The forum has the following as its objectives:

- Raise awareness of sustainable urbanisation among stakeholders and constituencies, including the general public.
- Improve the collective knowledge of sustainable urban development through inclusive open debates, sharing of lessons learned and the exchange of best practices and good policies.
- Increase coordination and cooperation between different stakeholders and constituencies for the advancement and implementation of sustainable urbanisation.

== Conferences ==
| Edition | Year | Host City | Date | Theme | Ref. |
|---|---|---|---|---|---|
| I | 2002 | Nairobi, Kenya | 29 April – 3 May | Sustainable Urbanization | |
| II | 2004 | Barcelona, Spain | 13–17 September | Cities: Crossroads of Cultures, Inclusiveness, and Integration | |
| III | 2006 | Vancouver, Canada | 19–23 June | Sustainable Urbanization and Inclusive Cities | |
| IV | 2008 | Nanjing, China | 3–6 November | Harmonious Urbanization | |
| V | 2010 | Rio de Janeiro, Brazil | 22–26 March | The Right to the City: Bridging the Urban Divide | |
| VI | 2012 | Naples, Italy | 1–7 September | The Urban Future | |
| VII | 2014 | Medellín, Colombia | 5–11 April | Urban Equity in Development – Cities for Life | |
| IX (Note: In 2016, the eighth (VIII) edition was replaced with the United Nations Conference on Housing and Sustainable Urban Development in Quito, Ecuador to adapt the New Urban Agenda.) | 2018 | Kuala Lumpur, Malaysia | 7–13 February | Cities 2030, Cities for All: Implementing the New Urban Agenda | |
| X | 2020 | Abu Dhabi, United Arab Emirates | 8–13 February | Cities of Opportunities: Connecting Culture and Innovation | |
| XI | 2022 | Katowice, Poland | 26–30 June | Transforming Our Cities for a Better Urban Future | |
| XII | 2024 | Cairo, Egypt | 4–8 November | It All Starts at Home: Local Actions for Sustainable Cities and Communities | |
| XIII | 2026 | Baku, Azerbaijan | 17–22 May | Housing the World: Safe and Resilient Cities and Communities | |
| XIV | 2028 | Mexico City, Mexico | | | |

=== Forum 3 ===
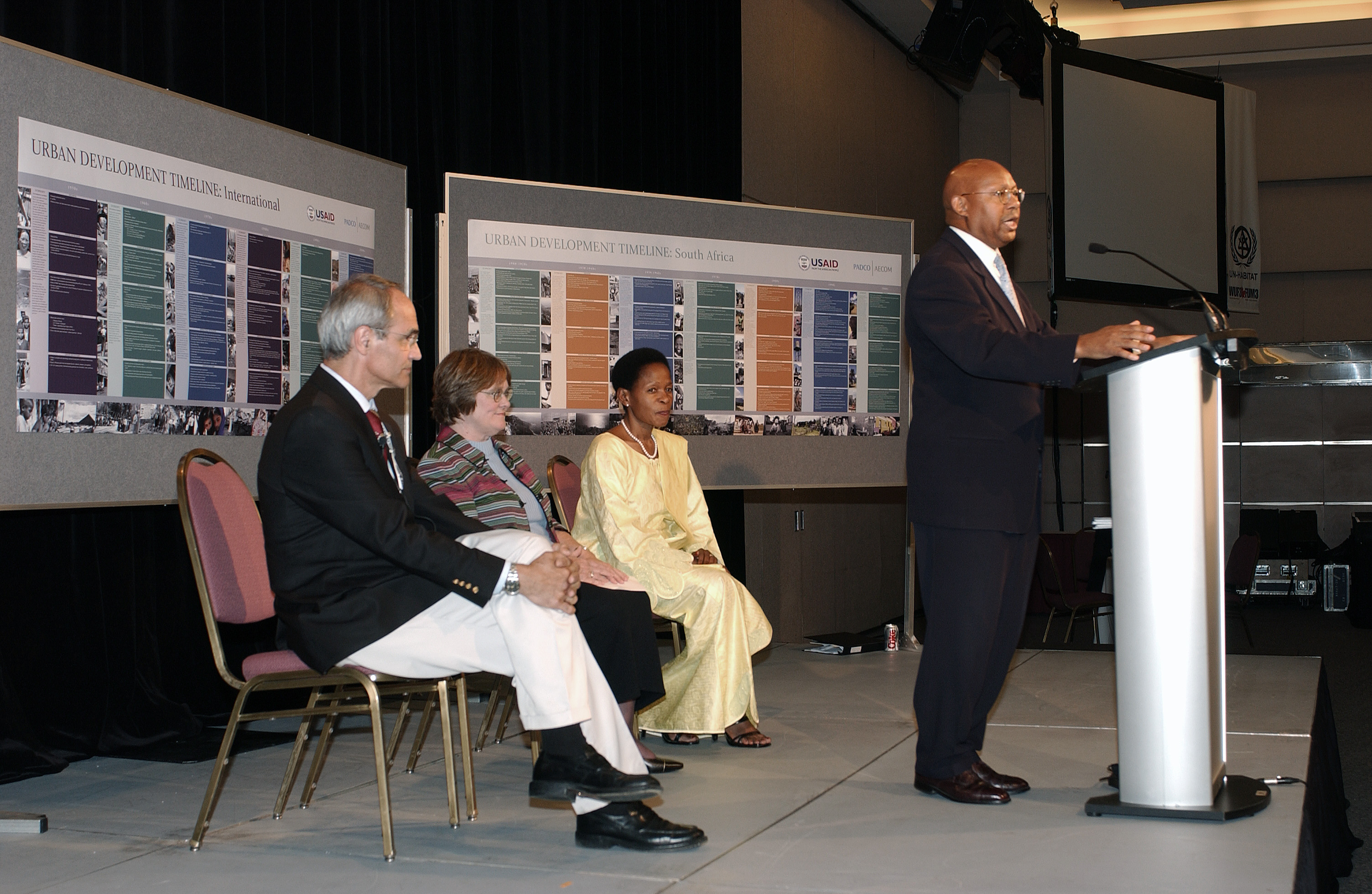
World Urban Forum in Vancouver, Alphonso Jackson

World Urban Forum III was an international UN-Habitat event on urban sustainability, also known as WUF3 (World Urban Forum) and FUM3 (Forum Urbain Mondial). WUF3 was organized by UN-Habitat and facilitated and funded by the Government of Canada. It was held on 19–23 June 2006 in Vancouver to help solve urgent problems of the world's cities.

The theme of the third session of the world urban forum was: "Sustainable Cities – Turning Ideas into Action". "From Ideas to Action" was the intended outcome of the conference. Officially it was suggested that this conference would be considered a success if every participant took home and implemented at least one new idea.

Within the next 50 years, two-thirds of the world's population will live in urban areas. As these cities expand, the world community faces the challenge of minimizing the growing poverty crisis and improving the urban poor's access to basic facilities, such as shelter, clean water and sanitation. World Urban Forum 3 brought together many of the world's thinkers on urbanization – experts, decision makers and members of public and private institutions – to zero in on solutions to these key 21st century challenges.

Habitat Jam, a three-day international online event, was conceived to set the stage for the WUF3 conference. Seventy actionable ideas were collected through the Jam and were used to define themes and shape discussion topics for delegates attending the forum. Participation in Habitat Jam was open to public and private-sector organizations and individuals around the world with an interest in urban issues. While the Jam is over the discussions remain available online.

Attendance at WUF3 was estimated at 11,418 people registered from more than 100 countries. The number of participants was 9,689 while 1,847 were support staff and volunteers. The gender ratios were 46.7% female and 52.1% male. Participants identified as Government, Parliamentarians, or Local Authority comprised 3,094 of the participants. The remaining participants were classified as Non-governmental organizations, Private Sector, Professional and Research Institutions, Foundations, Media, Inter-Governmental Organizations, Other Participants, Canada Secretariat and No Affiliation Indicated. Compared to previous forums there was a notable increase in private sector participation. Up from 203 to 1,187 private sector participants between WUF2 and WUF3 in Vancouver.

== Controversies ==
In 2023, the World Urban Forum faced criticism from the Ministry of Foreign Affairs of Ukraine for inviting the occupation authorities of Crimea to participate in a session. Ukrainian officials argued that the invitation could be perceived as an attempt to legitimize Russia's temporary occupation of Ukrainian territories.
