= Geothermal desalination =

Water desalination

Methods
- Distillation
  - Multi-stage flash distillation (MSF)
  - Multiple-effect distillation (MED)
  - Vapor-compression (VC)
- Ion exchange
- Membrane processes
  - Electrodialysis reversal (EDR)
  - Reverse osmosis (RO)
  - Nanofiltration (NF)
  - Membrane distillation (MD)
  - Forward osmosis (FO)
- Freezing desalination
- Geothermal desalination
- Solar desalination
  - Solar humidification–dehumidification (HDH)
  - Multiple-effect humidification (MEH)
  - Seawater greenhouse
- Methane hydrate crystallization
- High grade water recycling
- Wave-powered desalination

Geothermal desalination refers to the process of using geothermal energy to power the process of converting salt water to fresh water. The process is considered economically efficient, and while overall environmental impact is uncertain, it has potential to be more environmentally friendly compared to conventional desalination options. Geothermal desalination plants have already been successful in various regions, and there is potential for further development to allow the process to be used in an increased number of water scarce regions.

== Process explanation ==
Desalination is the process of removing minerals from seawater to convert it into fresh water. Desalination is divided into two categories in terms of processes: processes driven by thermal energy and processes driven by mechanical energy. Geothermal desalination uses geothermal energy as the thermal energy source to drive the desalination process.

There are two types of geothermal desalination: direct and indirect. Direct geothermal desalination heats seawater to boiling in an evaporator, then transferring to a condenser. In contrast, indirect geothermal desalination converts geothermal energy into electricity which is then used for membrane desalination. If the geothermal energy is used indirectly, it can be used to generate power for the water desalination process, as well as excess electricity that can be used for consumers. Similarly, if the geothermal energy is used directly, the excess geothermal energy can be used to drive heating and cooling processes.

== Applications ==
=== Current ===
One use of geothermal desalination is in producing fresh water for agriculture. One example of agricultural applications of geothermal energy is the Balcova-Naridere Geothermal Field (BNGF) in Turkey. However, arsenic and boron, two potentially toxic elements, have been found in the geothermal water used to generate electricity. Since the construction of the geothermal desalination plant in this region, these toxic elements have contaminated freshwater wells, rendering this water unusable for agriculture. Due to the increase in contamination in the surrounding environment, this project is not considered a success.

Another use of geothermal desalination is the production of drinking water, as shown by the Milos Island Project in Greece, which relied entirely on geothermal energy to produce desalinated water. This plant was constructed because geothermal energy is readily available in this region, as Milos Island is located in a volcanic region, which makes using geothermal energy a viable way to power the desalination of salt water. The Milos Island plant utilizes a combination of direct and indirect desalination. Unlike the BNGF project, this is considered a success as it produced drinkable water without polluting the environment at a low cost using only geothermal energy.

=== Future potential ===
Research indicates geothermal desalination can be implemented in some regions with water scarcity, as it is a relatively low cost solution to increasing available fresh water. In particular, two regions that have ample geothermal resources and are experiencing water scarcity are California and Saudi Arabia. Because these regions already have existing desalination plants, implementation of geothermal desalination plants would be relatively easy.

Furthermore, as the technology for producing geothermal energy improves, geothermal desalination will become possible in more regions. Technologies that are currently being developed will allow the geothermal water used to produce energy to be the water that becomes desalinated. This will allow regions that are not close to an ocean to perform geothermal desalination, which will widely expand the potential for regions to perform geothermal desalination.

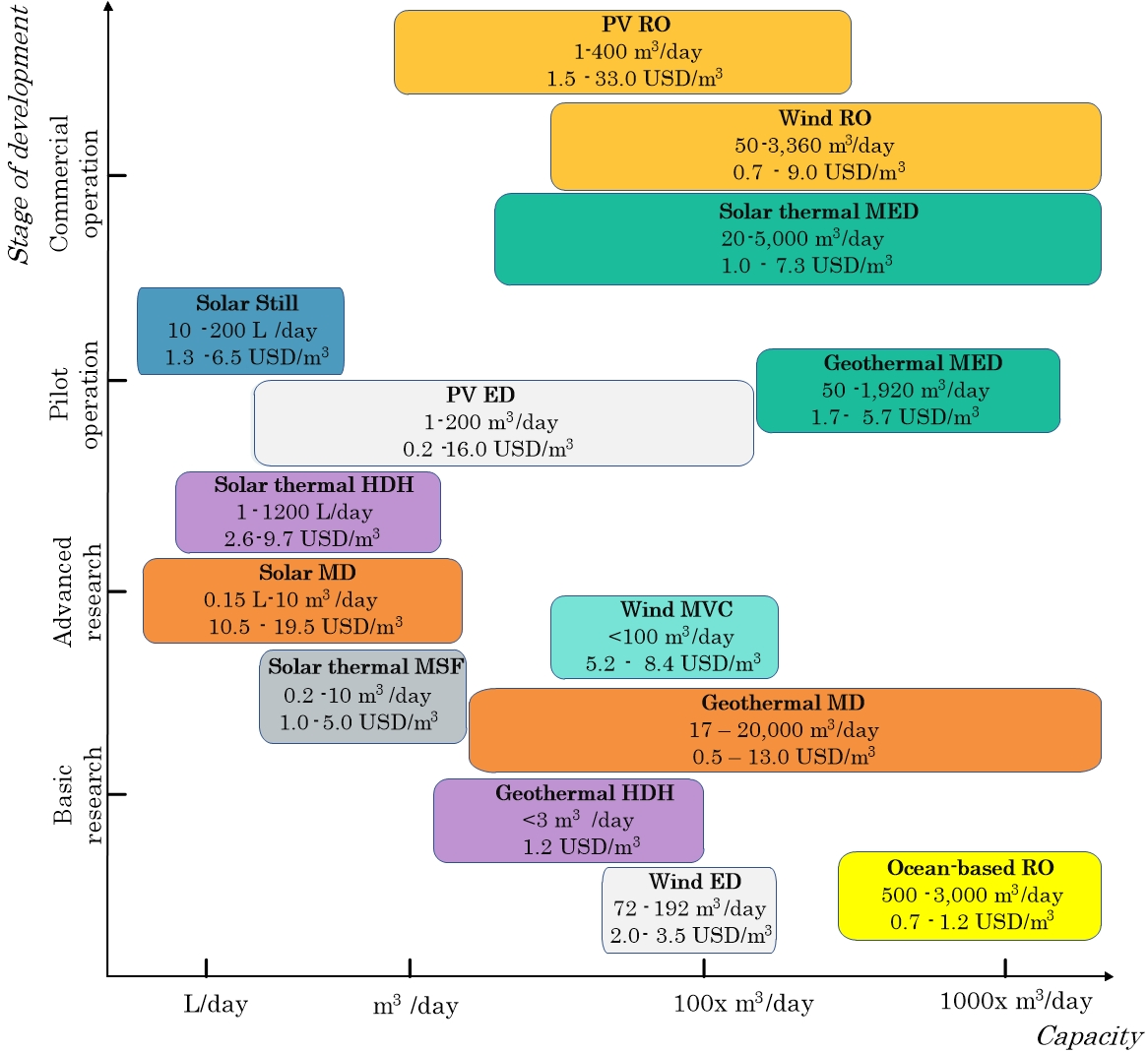
Various types of renewable desalination

== Environmental impacts ==
Much of the environmental impact in the geothermal desalination process stems from the use of geothermal energy, not from the desalination process itself. Geothermal desalination has both environmental benefits and drawbacks. One benefit is that geothermal energy is a renewable resource and emits fewer greenhouse gasses than non-renewable energy sources. Another benefit to the environment is that geothermal energy has a smaller land footprint compared to wind or solar energy. More specifically, the land usage required for geothermal desalination site has been estimated to be 1.2 to 2.7 square terameters are required for each megawatt of energy produced.

One environmental drawback is due to geothermal desalination being an energy intensive process; the energy consumption ranges from about 4 to 27 kWh per square meter of the desalination plant. Moreover, some researchers are concerned that due to lack of regulation on carbon dioxide (CO_{2}) emissions from geothermal plants, particularly in the United States, there are significant detrimental CO_{2} emissions from these plants that are not being measured. Geothermal power has been found to leak toxic elements such as mercury, boron, and arsenic into the environment, meaning geothermal desalination plants are a potential health hazard for their surrounding environment. Ultimately though, the long term environmental consequences of geothermal power desalination plants are still not clear.

== Economic factors ==
Geothermal energy is not dependent on day or night cycles and weather conditions, meaning it has a high-capacity factor, which is a measure of how often a plant is running at maximum power. This provides a stable and reliable energy supply. This also means that geothermal desalination plants can operate in any weather condition at any time of day. In terms of capacity, the United States, Indonesia, Philippines, Turkey, New Zealand, and Mexico accounted for 75% of the global geothermal energy capacity. It would be the most economically feasible to perform geothermal desalination in these countries due to their geothermal energy capacity.

For membrane desalination specifically, using geothermal energy reduces cost compared to using other energy sources. This is because geothermal power is traditionally produced at a competitive cost compared to other energy sources including fossil fuels; a 2011 study estimates the cost to be $0.10/kWh. Specifically, the US Department of Energy has estimated that geothermal desalination can produce desalinated water at a cost of $1.50 per cubic meter of desalinated water.

== History ==
The exact origins of geothermal desalination are unclear; however some early work is credited to Leon Awerbuch, a scientist working in Research & Development at the Bechtel Group at the time, who proposed the process of using geothermal energy for water desalination in 1972. In 1994, a prototype that used geothermal energy to power desalination was built by Caldor-Marseille. This prototype was able to produce a few cubic meters of desalinated water per day. In 1995, a geothermal desalination prototype plant was built in Tunisia, which is one of the earliest documented cases of a geothermal desalination plant. Its capacity was three cubic meters of water per day, which could meet the needs of the surrounding communities. The cost of water was estimated to be $1.20 per cubic meter.

== See also ==
- Geothermal power
- Desalination
