= Electrodialysis reversal =

Technique of separating salts from water

Water desalination

Methods
- Distillation
  - Multi-stage flash distillation (MSF)
  - Multiple-effect distillation (MED)
  - Vapor-compression (VC)
- Ion exchange
- Membrane processes
  - Electrodialysis reversal (EDR)
  - Reverse osmosis (RO)
  - Nanofiltration (NF)
  - Membrane distillation (MD)
  - Forward osmosis (FO)
- Freezing desalination
- Geothermal desalination
- Solar desalination
  - Solar humidification–dehumidification (HDH)
  - Multiple-effect humidification (MEH)
  - Seawater greenhouse
- Methane hydrate crystallization
- High grade water recycling
- Wave-powered desalination

Electrodialysis reversal (EDR) is an electrodialysis reversal water desalination membrane process that has been commercially used since the early 1960s. An electric current migrates dissolved salt ions, including fluorides, nitrates and sulfates, through an electrodialysis stack consisting of alternating layers of cationic and anionic ion exchange membranes. Periodically (3-4 times per hour), the direction of ion flow is reversed by reversing the polarity of the applied electric current.

Current reversal reduces clogging of membranes, as salt deposits in the membrane gets dissolved when the current flow is reversed. Electrodialysis reversal causes a small decrease in the diluted feed quality and requires increased complexity infrastructures, as reversible valves are required to change the flow direction of diluted and concentrated streams. However, it greatly increases ion exchange membranes durability, and membrane cleaning prevents electrical resistance increase of membrane as deposits accumulate in the membrane pores.

The polarity reversal of EDR alternately exposed membrane surfaces and the water flow paths to concentrate with a tendency to precipitate scale and desalted water that tends to dissolve scale. This allows the process to operate with supersaturated concentrate streams up to specific limits without chemical additions to prevent scale formation.

== See also ==
- Reversed electrodialysis (RED)
- Osmotic power
