= Forward osmosis =

Water purification process

Water desalination

Methods
- Distillation
  - Multi-stage flash distillation (MSF)
  - Multiple-effect distillation (MED)
  - Vapor-compression (VC)
- Ion exchange
- Membrane processes
  - Electrodialysis reversal (EDR)
  - Reverse osmosis (RO)
  - Nanofiltration (NF)
  - Membrane distillation (MD)
  - Forward osmosis (FO)
- Freezing desalination
- Geothermal desalination
- Solar desalination
  - Solar humidification–dehumidification (HDH)
  - Multiple-effect humidification (MEH)
  - Seawater greenhouse
- Methane hydrate crystallization
- High grade water recycling
- Wave-powered desalination

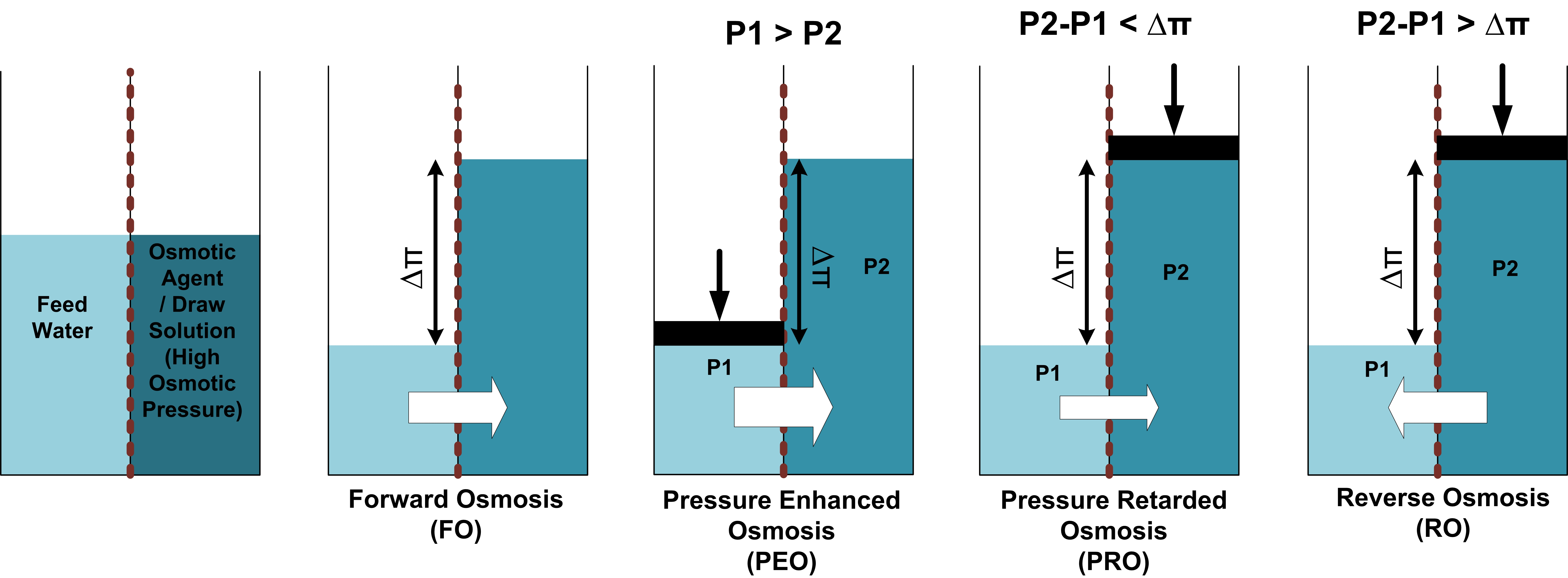
Osmotic Membrane Processes

Forward osmosis (FO) is an osmotic process that, like reverse osmosis (RO), uses a semi-permeable membrane to effect separation of water from dissolved solutes. The driving force for this separation is an osmotic pressure gradient, such that a "draw" solution of high concentration (relative to that of the feed solution), is used to induce a net flow of water through the membrane into the draw solution, thus effectively separating the feed water from its solutes. In contrast, the reverse osmosis process uses hydraulic pressure as the driving force for separation, which serves to counteract the osmotic pressure gradient that would otherwise favor water flux from the permeate to the feed. Hence significantly more energy is required for reverse osmosis compared to forward osmosis.

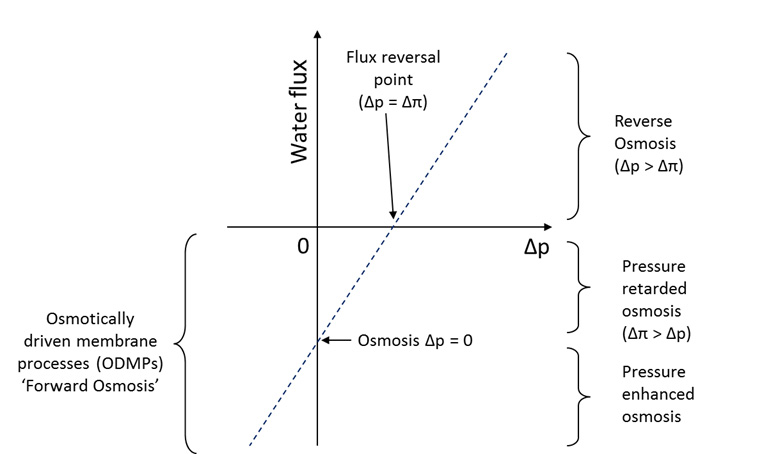
Family of osmotic membrane processes, including reverse osmosis and forward osmosis

The simplest equation describing the relationship between osmotic and hydraulic pressures and water (solvent) flux is:

$J_w = A \left(\Delta \pi - \Delta P \right)$

where $J_w$ is water flux, A is the hydraulic permeability of the membrane, Δπ is the difference in osmotic pressures on the two sides of the membrane, and ΔP is the difference in hydrostatic pressure (negative values of $J_w$ indicating reverse osmotic flow). The modeling of these relationships is in practice more complex than this equation indicates, with flux depending on the membrane, feed, and draw solution characteristics, as well as the fluid dynamics within the process itself.

Tsolute flux ($J_s$) for each individual solute can be modelled by Fick's law

$J_s = B \Delta c$

Where $B$ is the solute permeability coefficient and $\Delta c$ is the trans-membrane concentration differential for the solute. It is clear from this governing equation that a solute will diffuse from an area of high concentration to an area of low concentration if solutes can diffuse across a membrane. This is well known in reverse osmosis where solutes from the feedwater diffuse to the product water, however in the case of forward osmosis the situation can be far more complicated.

In FO processes we may have solute diffusion in both directions depending on the composition of the draw solution, type of membrane used and feed water characteristics. Reverse solute flux ($J_s$) does two things; the draw solution solutes may diffuse to the feed solution and the feed solution solutes may diffuse to the draw solution. Clearly these phenomena have consequences in terms of the selection of the draw solution for any particular FO process. For instance the loss of draw solution may affect the feed solution perhaps due to environmental issues or contamination of the feed stream, such as in osmotic membrane bioreactors.

An additional distinction between the reverse osmosis (RO) and forward osmosis (FO) processes is that the permeate water resulting from an RO process is in most cases fresh water ready for use. In FO, an additional process is required to separate fresh water from a diluted draw solution. Types of processes used are reverse osmosis, solvent extraction, magnetic and thermolytic. Depending on the concentration of solutes in the feed (which dictates the necessary concentration of solutes in the draw) and the intended use of the product of the FO process, the addition of a separation step may not be required. The membrane separation of the FO process in effect results in a "trade" between the solutes of the feed solution and the draw solution.

The forward osmosis process is also known as osmosis or in the case of a number of companies who have coined their own terminology 'engineered osmosis' and 'manipulated osmosis'.

== Applications ==
=== Emergency drinks ===
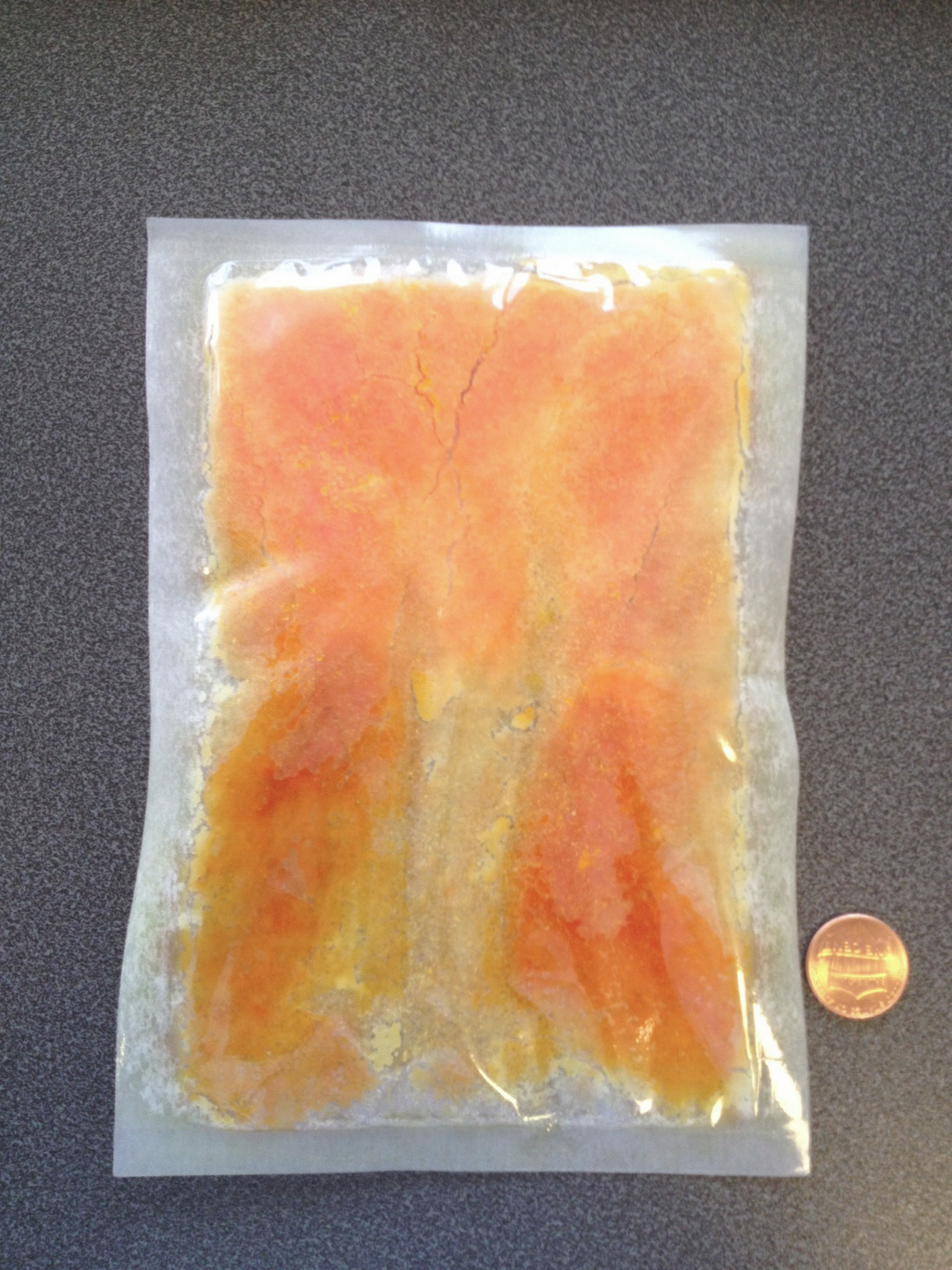
Hydration bag before use

One example of an application of this type may be found in "hydration bags", which use an ingestible draw solute and are intended for separation of water from dilute feeds. This allows, for example, the ingestion of water from surface waters (streams, ponds, puddles, etc.) that may be expected to contain pathogens or toxins that are readily rejected by the FO membrane. With sufficient contact time, such water will permeate the membrane bag into the draw solution, leaving the undesirable feed constituents behind. The diluted draw solution may then be ingested directly. Typically, the draw solutes are sugars such as glucose or fructose, which provide the additional benefit of nutrition to the user of the FO device. A point of additional interest with such bags is that they may be readily used to recycle urine, greatly extending the ability of a backpacker or soldier to survive in arid environments. This process may also, in principle, be employed with highly concentrated saline feedwater sources such as seawater, as one of the first intended uses of FO with ingestible solutes was for survival in life rafts at sea.

=== Desalination ===
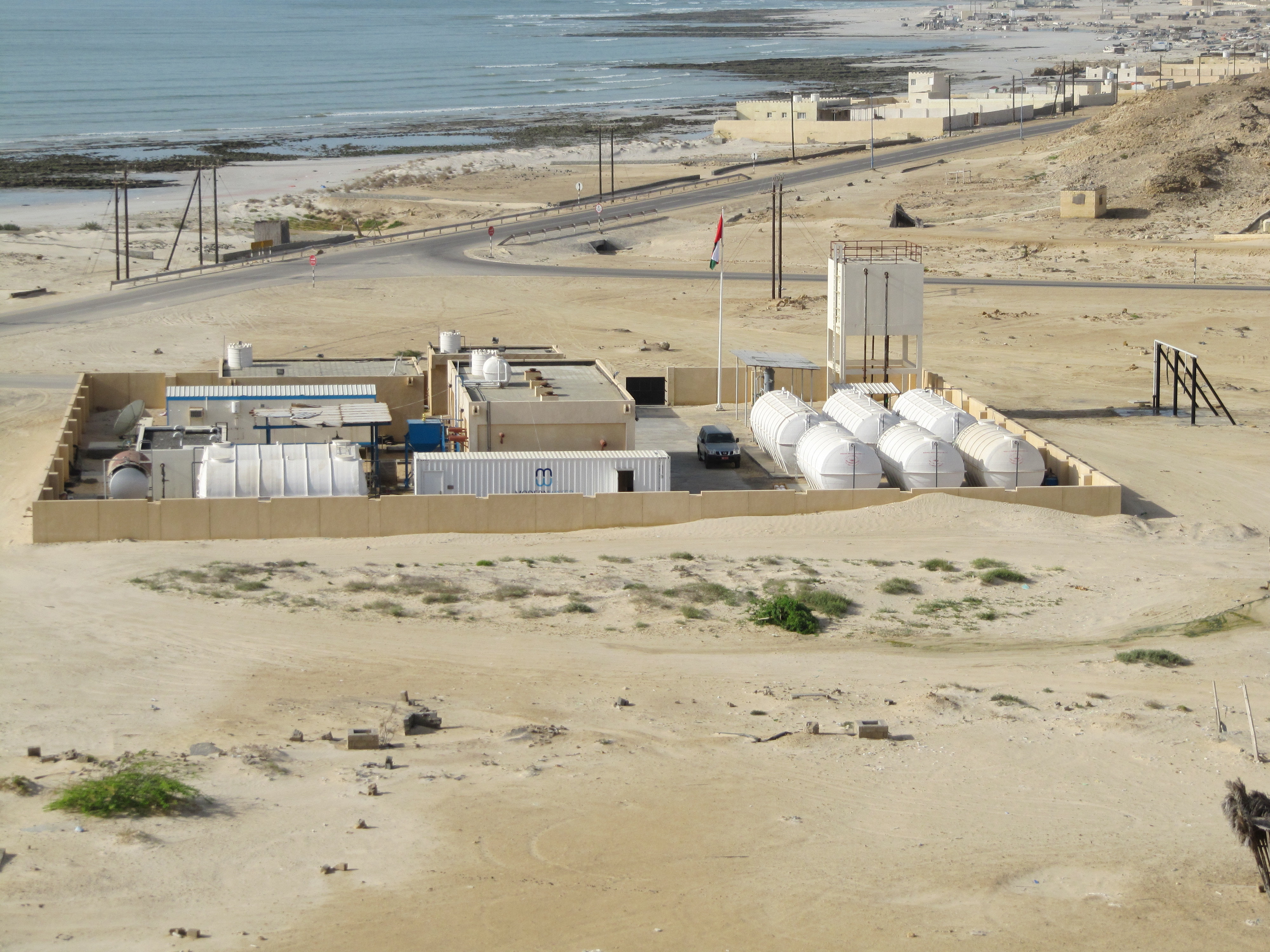
Modern Water's containerised forward osmosis desalination plant at Al Khaluf, Oman

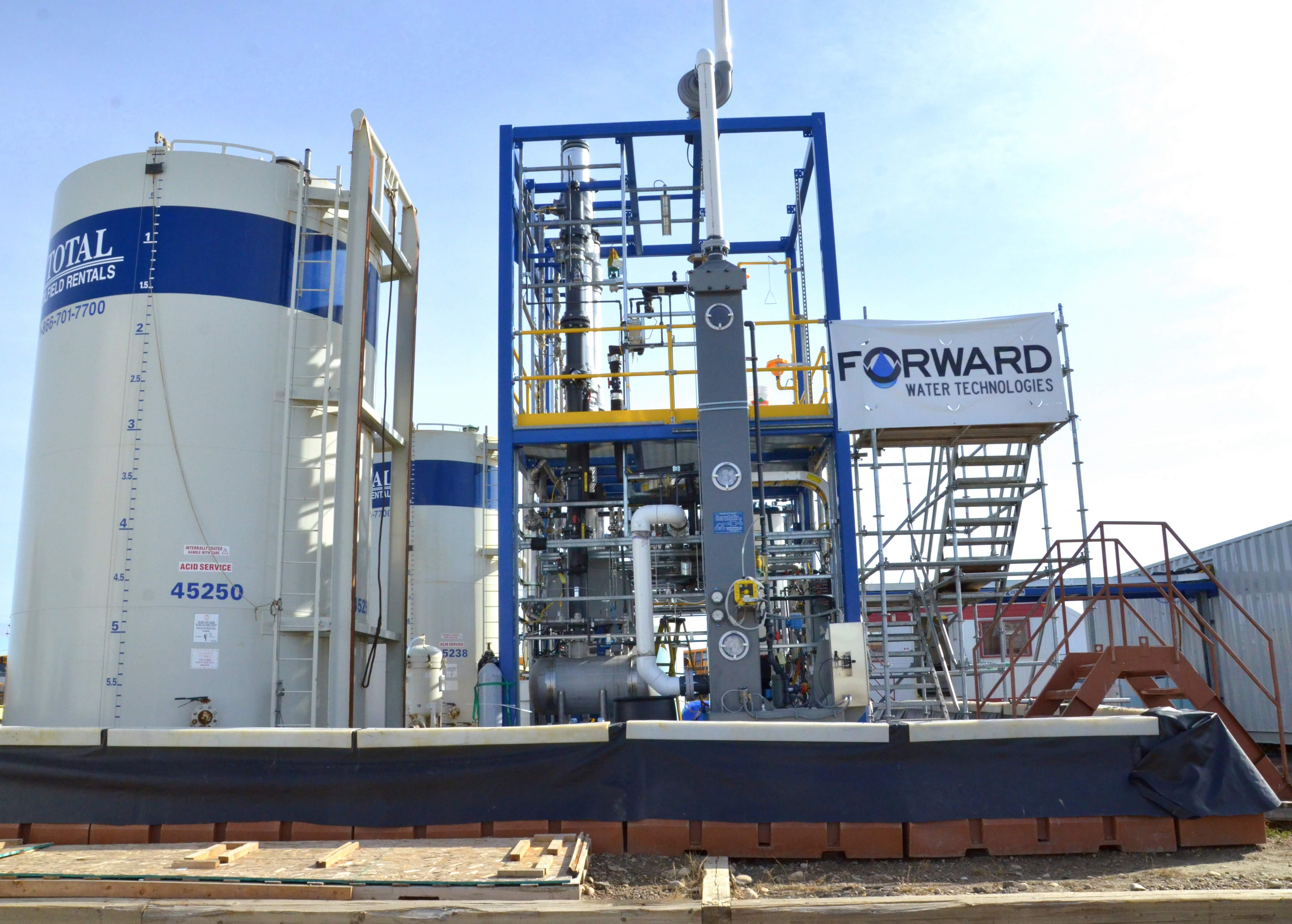
Forward Water Technologies Industrial FO Installation at Terrapure-2019

Desalinated water can be produced from the diluted draw / osmotic agent solution, using a second process. This may be by membrane separation, thermal method, physical separation or a combination of these processes. The process has the feature of inherently low fouling because of the forward osmosis first step, unlike conventional reverse osmosis desalination plants where fouling is often a problem. Modern Water has deployed forward osmosis based desalination plants in Gibraltar and Oman. In March 2010, National Geographic magazine cited forward osmosis as one of three technologies that promised to reduce the energy requirements of desalination.

=== Evaporative cooling tower – make-up water ===
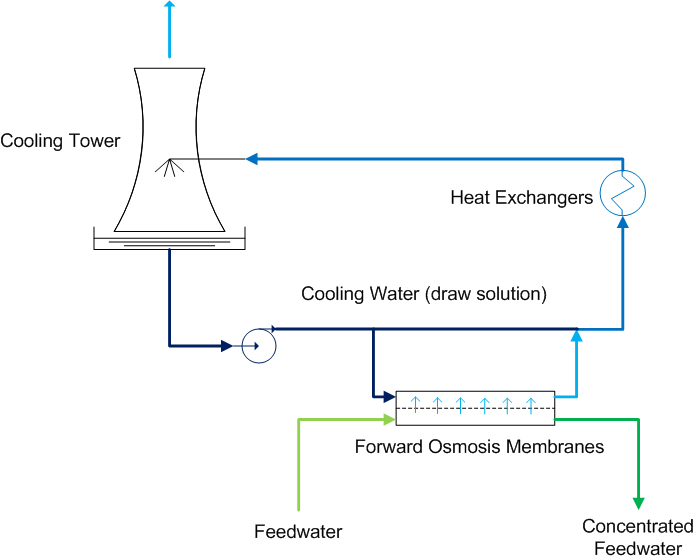
Simple diagram of forward osmosis applied to the production of make-up water for evaporative cooling

One other application developed, where only the forward osmosis step is used, is in evaporative cooling make-up water. In this case the cooling water is the draw solution and the water lost by evaporation is simply replaced using water produced by forward osmosis from a suitable source, such as seawater, brackish water, treated sewage effluent or industrial waste water. Thus in comparison with other ‘desalination’ processes that may be used for make-up water the energy consumption is a fraction of these with the added advantage of the low fouling propensity of a forward osmosis process.

=== Landfill leachate treatment ===
In the case where the desired product is fresh water that does not contain draw solutes, a second separation step is required. The first separation step of FO, driven by an osmotic pressure gradient, does not require a significant energy input (only unpressurized stirring or pumping of the solutions involved). The second separation step, however does typically require energy input. One method used for the second separation step is to employ RO. This approach has been used, for instance, in the treatment of landfill leachate. An FO membrane separation is used to draw water from the leachate feed into a saline (NaCl) brine. The diluted brine is then passed through a RO process to produce fresh water and a reusable brine concentrate. The advantage of this method is not a savings in energy, but rather in the fact that the FO process is more resistant to fouling from the leachate feed than a RO process alone would be. A similar FO/RO hybrid has been used for the concentration of food products, such as fruit juice.

=== Brine concentration ===
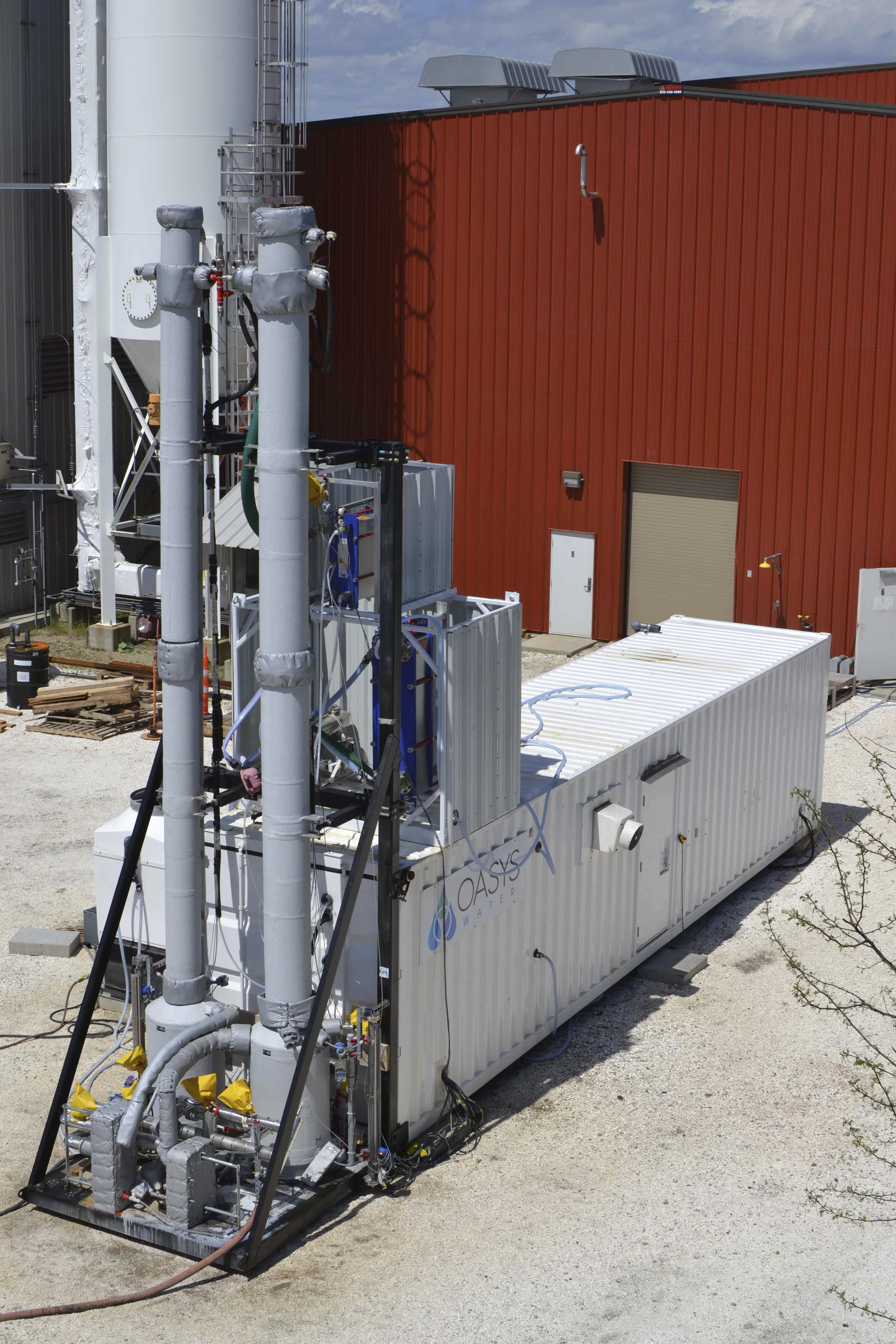
Oasys FO Pilot System

Brine concentration using forward osmosis may be achieved using a high osmotic pressure draw solution with a means to recover and regenerate it. One such process uses the ammonia-carbon dioxide (NH_{3}/CO_{2}) forward osmosis process invented at Yale University by Rob McGinnis, who subsequently founded Oasys Water to commercialize the technology. Because ammonia and carbon dioxide readily dissociate into gases using heat, the draw solutes can effectively be recovered and reused in a closed loop system, achieving separation through the conversion between thermal energy and osmotic pressure. NH_{3}/CO_{2} FO brine concentration was initially demonstrated in the oil and gas industry to treat produced water in the Permian Basin area of Texas, and is currently being used in power and manufacturing plants in China.

=== Feed water 'softening' / pre-treatment for thermal desalination ===
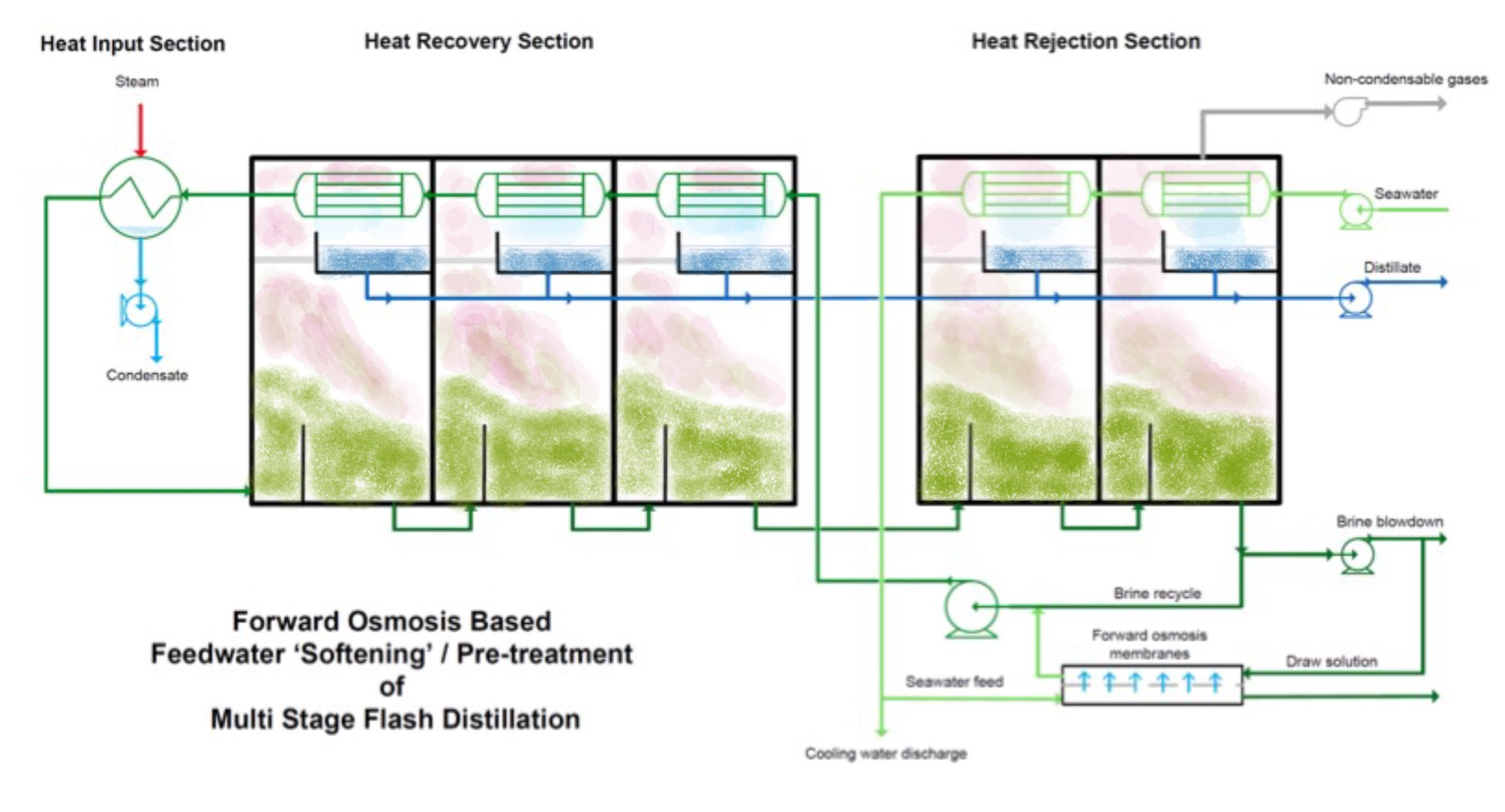
Forward osmosis based feedwater pre-treatment for multi stage flash distillation

One unexploited application is to 'soften' or pre-treat the feedwater to multi stage flash (MSF) or multiple effect distillation (MED) plants by osmotically diluting the recirculating brine with the cooling water. This reduces the concentrations of scale forming calcium carbonate and calcium sulphate compared to the normal process, thus allowing an increase in top brine temperature (TBT), output and gained output ratio (GOR). Darwish et al. showed that the TBT could be raised from 110 °C to 135 °C whilst maintaining the same scaling index for calcium sulphate.

=== Food Processing ===
Although osmotic treatment of food products (e.g., preserved fruits and meats) is very common in the food industry, FO treatment for concentration of beverages and liquid foods has been studied at laboratory-scale only. FO has several advantages as a process for concentrating beverages and liquid foods, including operation at low temperatures and low pressures that promote high retention of sensory (e.g., taste, aroma, color) and nutritional (e.g., vitamin) value, high rejection, and potentially low membrane fouling compared to pressure-driven membrane processes.

=== Osmotic power ===
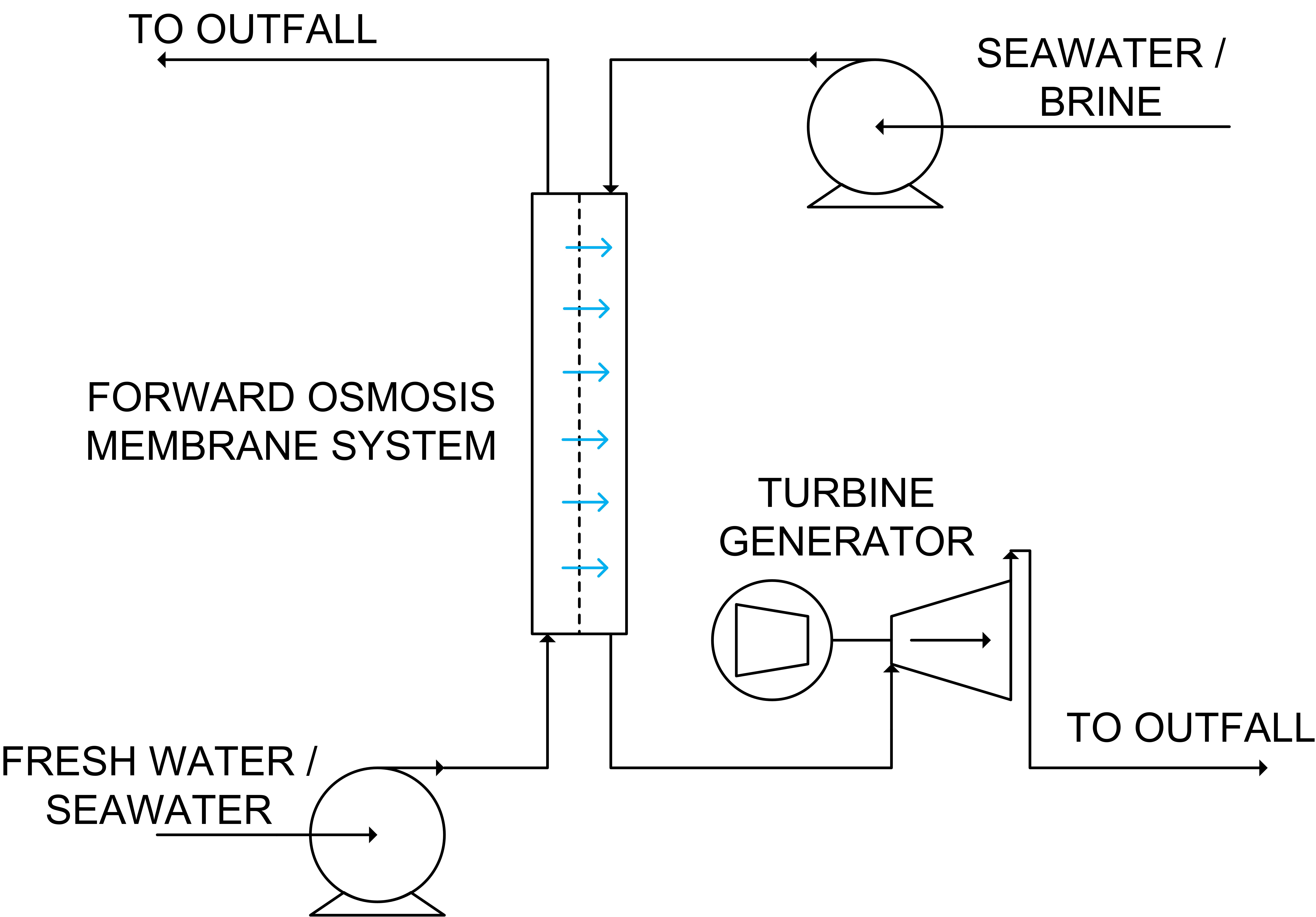
Simple PRO power generation scheme

In 1954 Pattle suggested that there was an untapped source of power when a river mixes with the sea, in terms of the lost osmotic pressure, however it was not until the mid ‘70s where a practical method of exploiting it using selectively permeable membranes by Loeb and independently by Jellinek was outlined. This process was referred by Loeb as pressure retarded osmosis (PRO) and one simplistic implementation is shown opposite. Some situations that may be envisaged to exploit it are using the differential osmotic pressure between a low brackish river flowing into the sea, or brine and seawater. The worldwide theoretical potential for osmotic power has been estimated at 1,650 TWh / year.

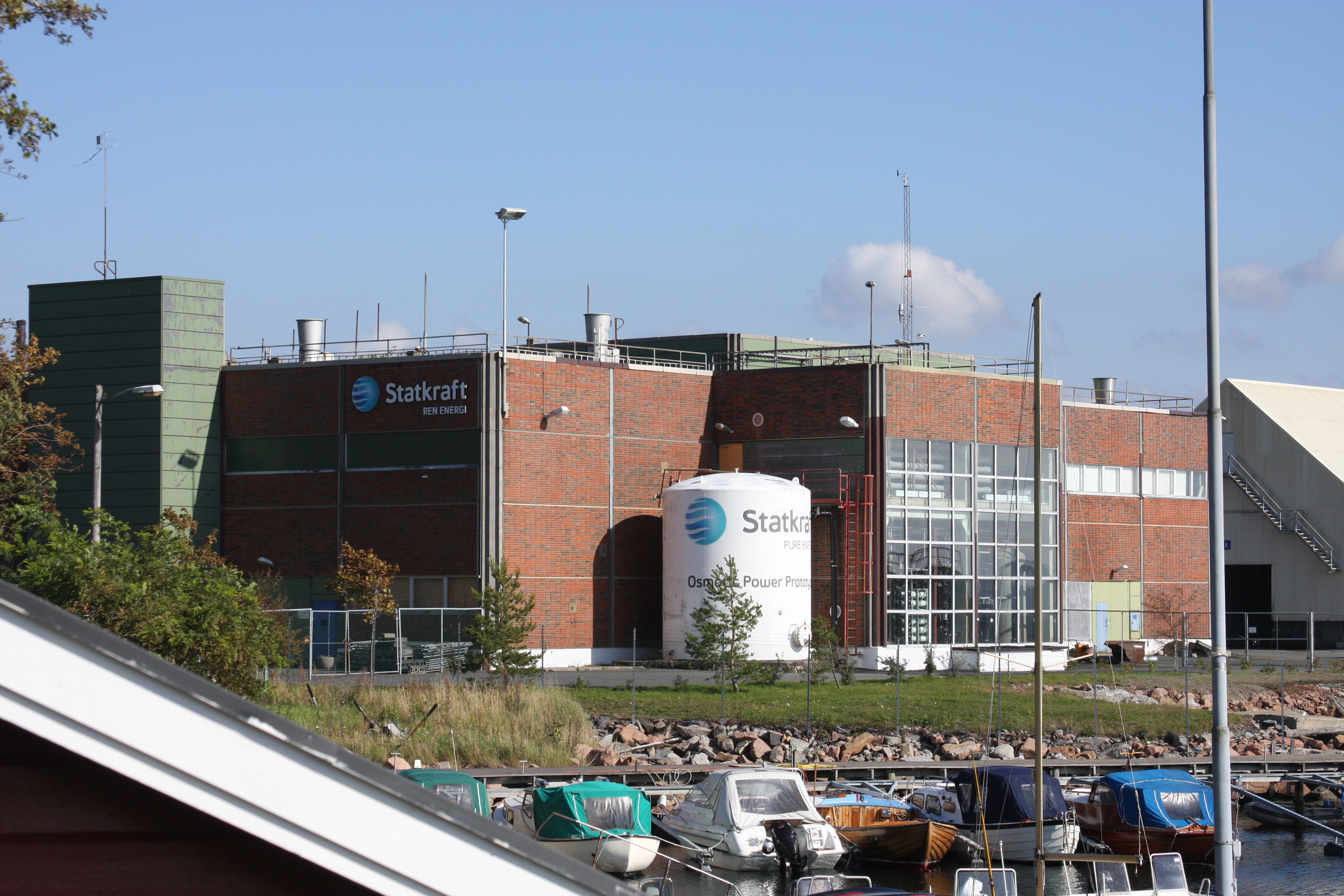
Statkraft PRO pilot plant

In more recent times a significant amount of research and development work has been undertaken and funded by Statkraft, the Norwegian state energy company. A prototype plant was built in Norway generating a gross output between 2 – 4 kW; see Statkraft osmotic power prototype in Hurum. A much larger plant with an output of 1 – 2 MW at Sunndalsøra, 400 km north of Oslo was considered but was subsequently dropped. The New Energy and Industrial Technology Development Organisation (NEDO) in Japan is funding work on osmotic power.

== Industrial usage ==
=== Advantages ===
Forward osmosis (FO) has many positive aspects in the treating of industrial effluents containing many different kinds of contaminants and also in the treating of salty waters. When these draw effluents have moderate to low concentrations of removable agents, the FO membranes are really efficient and have the flexibility of adapting the membrane depending on the quality desired for the product water. FO systems are also really useful when using them combined with other kinds of treatment systems as they compensate the deficiencies that the other systems may have. This is also helpful in processes where the recovery of a certain product is essential to minimize costs or to improve efficiency such as biogas production processes.

=== Disadvantages ===
The main disadvantage of the FO processes is the high fouling factor that they may experience. This occurs when treating a high saturated draw effluent, resulting in the membrane getting obtruded and no longer making its function. This implies that the process has to be stopped and the membrane cleaned. This issue happens less in other kind of membrane treatments as they have artificial pressure forcing to trespass the membrane reducing the fouling effect. Also there's an issue with the yet to be developed membranes technology. This affects to the FO processes as the membranes used are expensive and not highly efficient or ideal for the desired function. This means that many times other cheaper and simpler systems are used rather than membranes.

=== Industrial market and future ===
Currently the industry uses few FO membranes processes (and membranes technologies in general) as they're complex processes which are also expensive and require a lot of cleaning procedures and that sometimes only work under certain conditions that in industry can't always be ensured. For that reason the focus for the future in membranes is to improve the technology so it's more flexible and suitable for general industrial usage. This will be done by investing in research and by slowly getting these developments into the market so the production cost is lowered as more membranes are produced. Keeping with the current development it can be ensured that in few years from now, membranes will be spread-used in many different industrial processes (not only water treatments) and that there will appear many fields where FO processes can be used.

== Research ==
An area of current research in FO involves direct removal of draw solutes, in this case by means of a magnetic field. Small (nanoscale) magnetic particles are suspended in solution creating osmotic pressures sufficient for the separation of water from a dilute feed. Once the draw solution containing these particles has been diluted by the FO water flux, they may be separated from that solution by use of a magnet (either against the side of a hydration bag, or around a pipe in-line in a steady state process).
