= Solar humidification =

Thermal water desalination method

Water desalination

Methods
- Distillation
  - Multi-stage flash distillation (MSF)
  - Multiple-effect distillation (MED)
  - Vapor-compression (VC)
- Ion exchange
- Membrane processes
  - Electrodialysis reversal (EDR)
  - Reverse osmosis (RO)
  - Nanofiltration (NF)
  - Membrane distillation (MD)
  - Forward osmosis (FO)
- Freezing desalination
- Geothermal desalination
- Solar desalination
  - Solar humidification–dehumidification (HDH)
  - Multiple-effect humidification (MEH)
  - Seawater greenhouse
- Methane hydrate crystallization
- High grade water recycling
- Wave-powered desalination

The solar humidification–dehumidification method (HDH) is a thermal water desalination method. It is based on evaporation of sea water or brackish water and subsequent condensation of the generated humid air, mostly at ambient pressure. This process mimics the natural water cycle, but over a much shorter time frame.

== Overview ==
The simplest configuration is implemented in the solar still, evaporating the sea water inside a glass covered box and condensing the water vapor on the lower side of the glass cover but not below the unevaporated seawater. More sophisticated designs separate the solar heat gain section from the evaporation-condensation chamber. An optimized design comprises separated evaporation and condensation sections. A significant part of the heat consumed for evaporation can be regained during condensation. An example for such an optimized thermal desalination cycle is the multiple-effect humidification (MEH) method of desalination.

Solar humidification takes place in every greenhouse. Water evaporates from the surfaces of soil, water and plants because of thermal input. In this way the humidification process is naturally integrated within the architecture of the greenhouse. Several companies like Seawater greenhouse utilize this inherent feature of a greenhouse in order to conduct desalination inside the atmosphere of the facility.

== Design ==
The method can be optimized by using various effects in the categories of thermal energy collection and storage for continued nocturnal operation, choice of site location, various evaporation effects, as well as condensator design and provision of cooling energy to harvest distillate from the moist air. A Desalination Greenhouse using all of the effects in all categories, with an emphasis on the optimized combination of the effects including synergies, is the IBTS Greenhouse. The Global water cycle also includes all sub-effects of HDH, like increased evaporation over the oceans surface and surface increase by wind, making the generation of freshwater on the planet so efficient.

== Tests ==
There are successful small-scale agricultural experimentation done in arid regions such as Israel, West Africa, and Peru. The major difficulty lies in effectively concentrating the energy of sun on a small area to speed up evaporation.
