= Multiple-effect humidification =

Method for sea water desalination

Water desalination

Methods
- Distillation
  - Multi-stage flash distillation (MSF)
  - Multiple-effect distillation (MED)
  - Vapor-compression (VC)
- Ion exchange
- Membrane processes
  - Electrodialysis reversal (EDR)
  - Reverse osmosis (RO)
  - Nanofiltration (NF)
  - Membrane distillation (MD)
  - Forward osmosis (FO)
- Freezing desalination
- Geothermal desalination
- Solar desalination
  - Solar humidification–dehumidification (HDH)
  - Multiple-effect humidification (MEH)
  - Seawater greenhouse
- Methane hydrate crystallization
- High grade water recycling
- Wave-powered desalination

Multiple-effect humidification (MEH) is a method used for thermal desalination of sea water. It uses multiple evaporation–condensation cycles at separate temperature levels to minimize the total energy consumption of solar humidification processes.
