= Modern Water =

Modern Water plc
- Traded as: AIM: MWG
- Headquarters: London, United Kingdom
- Key people: Simon Humphrey, CEO
- Revenue: £ 2,772 thousand (2014)
- Operating income: £ (17,895) thousand (2014)
- Net income: £ (17,747) thousand (2014)
- Number of employees: 50 - 100 (2014)
- Parent: Microsaic Systems; (2024–present)
- Subsidiaries: Modern Water Services Ltd, Modern Water Monitoring Ltd, Modern Water Inc, Modern Water Technologies LLC, MW Monitoring Ltd, Surrey Aquatechnology Ltd, Modern Water Holdings Ltd, Modern Water Technology (Shanghai) Co. Ltd
- Website: www.modernwater.com

Modern Water plc is a British company which was first listed on the AIM submarket of the London Stock Exchange on the 12 June 2007. It owns, installs and operates advanced membrane technologies and develops and supplies systems for water monitoring.

In December 2011, the company completed its acquisition of the water quality division of Strategic Diagnostics Inc. ("SDIX"), including its Microtox toxicity testing technology.

In January 2024, it was announced that Microsaic Systems had acquired the company.

== Divisions ==
=== Membrane Process Division ===
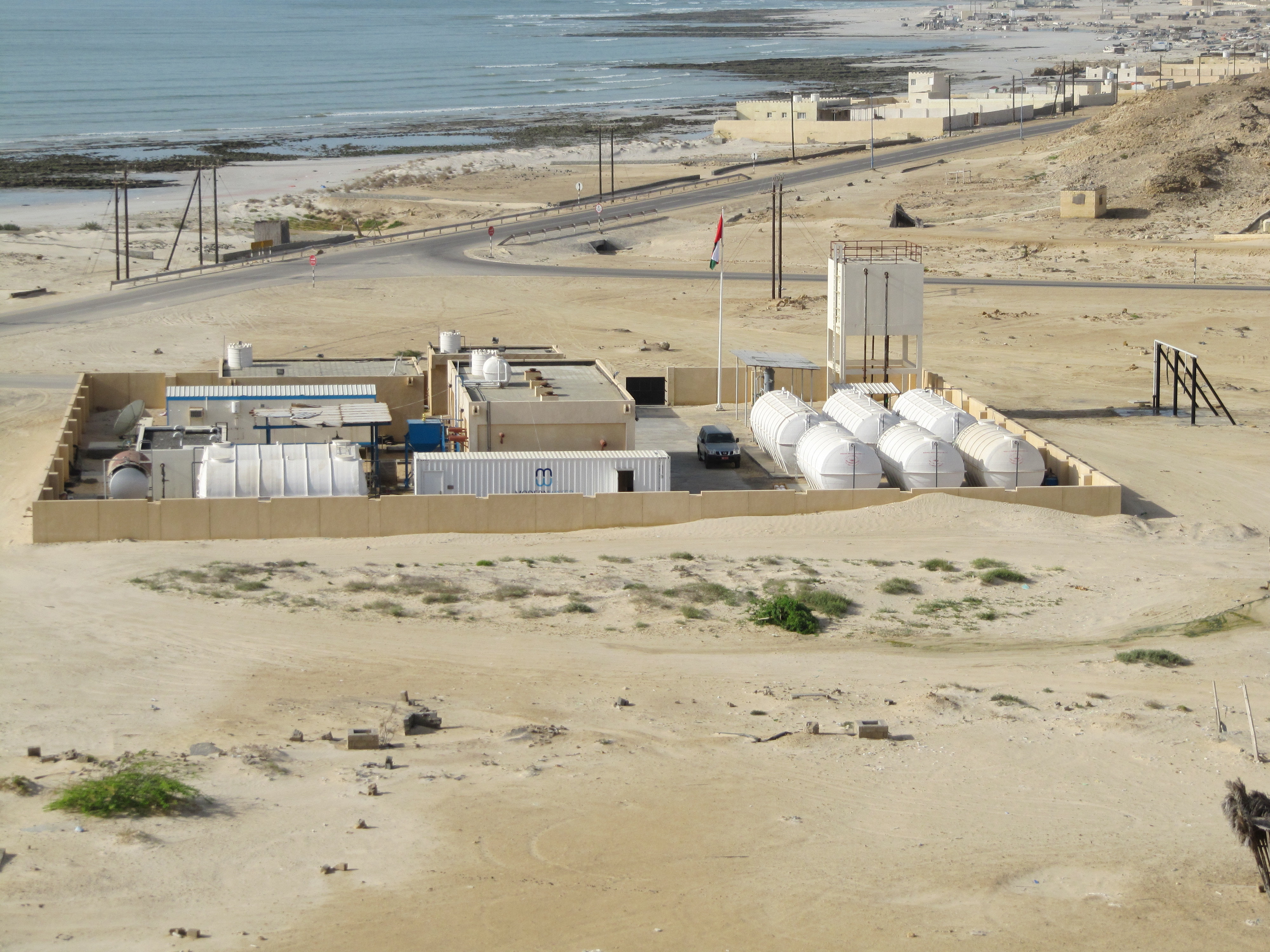
Modern Water's containerised forward osmosis desalination plant at Al Khaluf, Oman

Modern Water has developed a number of Forward Osmosis (FO) membrane processes including: desalination, evaporative cooling systems, enhanced oil recovery and hydro osmotic power (HOP).

Modern Water has deployed Forward Osmosis as a platform technology to produce both desalinated water and evaporative cooling make-up water , with sites in Oman and at a pilot plant in Gibraltar. In 2014, Modern Water is the only company in the world with a commercial Forward Osmosis plant which is located in Al Najdah in Oman. Construction of the plant was completed in September 2012 and it is now being operated by Modern Water.

In March 2010, National Geographic magazine cited forward osmosis as one of three technologies that promised to reduce the energy requirements of desalination.

In 2013, Modern Water contracted to build desalination projects in China, which require more water in some areas for drinking and for irrigation. One of the company's main competitors in Asia is Consolidated Water.

Following the success of its Gibraltar forward osmosis pilot plant, In 2014, Modern Water and Northumberland Services signed a 22 million pound, 20-year contract to build and operate a wastewater plant on the rock of Gibraltar.

=== Monitoring Division ===
The Monitoring division develops systems for monitoring and improving water quality. It provides acute toxicity monitoring systems for online, portable and lab use, together with on-line and portable trace metal measurement technology. Modern Water has installed its systems in various countries worldwide, from local installations in the UK and as far away as Argentina.
