= Solar desalination =

Desalination technique powered by solar energy

Solar desalination is a desalination technique powered by solar energy. The two common methods are direct (thermal) and indirect (photovoltaic).

== History ==
Solar distillation has been used for thousands of years. Early Greek mariners and Persian alchemists produced both freshwater and medicinal distillates. Solar stills were the first method used on a large scale to convert contaminated water into a potable form.

In 1870 the first US patent was granted for a solar distillation device to Norman Wheeler and Walton Evans. Two years later in Las Salinas, Chile, Swedish engineer Charles Wilson began building a solar distillation plant to supply freshwater to workers at a saltpeter and silver mine. It operated continuously for 40 years and distilled an average of 22.7 m^{3} of water a day using the effluent from mining operations as its feed water.

Solar desalination in the United States began in the early 1950s when Congress passed the Conversion of Saline Water Act, which led to the establishment of the Office of Saline Water in 1955. Its main function was to administer funds for desalination research and development projects. One of five demonstration plants was located in Daytona Beach, Florida. Many of the projects were aimed at solving water scarcity issues in remote desert and coastal communities. In the 1960s and 1970s several distillation plants were constructed on the Greek isles with capacities ranging from 2000 to 8500 m^{3}/day. In 1984 a plant was constructed in Abu-Dhabi with a capacity of 120 m^{3}/day that is still in operation. In Italy, an open source design called "the Eliodomestico" by Gabriele Diamanti was developed for personal costing $50.

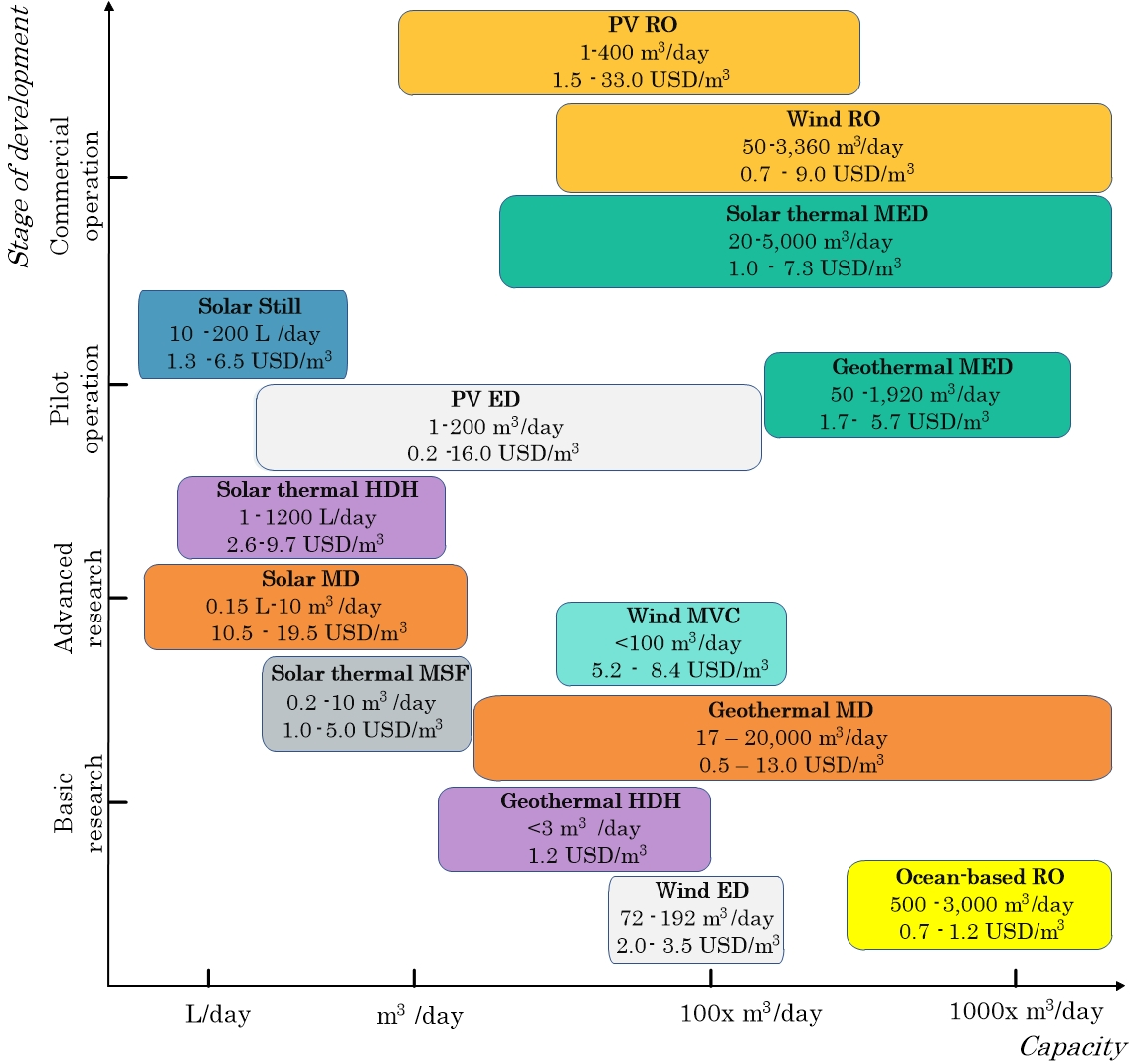
The status of renewable-powered desalination technologies

Of the estimated 22 million m^{3} daily freshwater produced through desalination worldwide, less than 1% uses solar energy. The prevailing methods of desalination, MSF and RO, are energy-intensive and rely heavily on fossil fuels. Because of inexpensive methods of freshwater delivery and abundant low-cost energy resources, solar distillation has been viewed as cost-prohibitive and impractical. It is estimated that desalination plants powered by conventional fuels consume the equivalent of 203 million tons of fuel a year.

== Methods ==
Solar desalination is a technique that harnesses solar energy to convert saline water into fresh water, making it suitable for human consumption and irrigation. The process can be categorized based on the type of solar energy source utilized. In direct solar desalination, saline water absorbs solar energy and evaporates, leaving behind salt and other impurities. An example of this is solar stills, where an enclosed environment allows for the collection and condensation of pure water vapor. On the other hand, indirect solar desalination involves the use of solar collectors that capture and transfer solar energy to saline water. This energy is then used to power desalination processes such as Humidification-Dehumidification (HDH) and diffusion-driven methods.

=== Direct ===
In the direct (distillation) method, a solar collector is coupled with a distilling mechanism. Solar stills of this type are described in survival guides, provided in marine survival kits, and employed in many small desalination and distillation plants.

Water production is proportional to the area of the solar surface and solar incidence angle and has an average estimated value of 3–4 litres per square metre per day (0.074–0.098 US gal/sq ft/d). Because of this proportionality and the relatively high cost of property and material for construction, distillation tends to favor plants with production capacities less than 200 m^{3}/d (53,000 US gal/d).

==== Single-effect ====
This uses the same process as rainfall. A transparent cover encloses a pan where saline water is placed. The latter traps solar energy, evaporating the seawater. The vapor condenses on the inner face of a sloping transparent cover, leaving behind salts, inorganic and organic components and microbes.

The direct method achieves values of 4–5 L/m^{2}/day and efficiency of 30–40%. Efficiency can be improved to 45% by using a double slope or an additional condenser.

==== Types ====
===== Wick still =====
In a wick still, feed water flows slowly through a porous radiation-absorbing pad. This requires less water to be heated and is easier to change the angle towards the sun which saves time and achieves higher temperatures.

===== Diffusion still =====
A diffusion still is composed of a hot storage tank coupled to a solar collector and the distillation unit. Heating is produced by the thermal diffusion between them.

==== Challenges ====
Thermal methods are relatively simple and require little space. They are typically used in small systems. Production is limited due to low operating temperature and pressure, so they are targeted for systems that yield ~200 m^{3}/day.

System efficiency is governed by heat and mass transfer rates during evaporation and condensation.

Condensation heat is valuable because of the amount of solar energy needed to evaporate water and generate saturated, vapor-laden hot air. This energy is transferred to the condenser's surface during condensation. With most solar stills, this heat is emitted as waste heat.

Heat recovery allows the heat input to be reused, providing several times the water. One solution is to reduce the reservoir pressure. This can be accomplished using a vacuum pump, which significantly decreases the required heat energy. For example, water at a pressure of 0.1 atmospheres boils at 50 °C (122 °F) rather than 100 °C (212 °F).

=== Solar humidification–dehumidification ===
The solar humidification–dehumidification (HDH) process (also called the multiple-effect humidification–dehumidification process, solar multistage condensation evaporation cycle (SMCEC) or multiple-effect humidification (MEH) mimics the natural water cycle on a shorter time frame by distilling water. Thermal energy produces water vapor that is condensed in a separate chamber. In sophisticated systems, waste heat is minimized by collecting the heat from the condensing water vapor and pre-heating the incoming water source.

=== Indirect ===
Indirect desalination employs a solar collection array, consisting of photovoltaic and fluid-based thermal collectors, and a separate conventional desalination plant. Many arrangements have been analyzed, experimentally tested and deployed. Categories include multiple-effect humidification (MEH), multi-stage flash distillation (MSF), multiple-effect distillation (MED), multiple-effect boiling (MEB), humidification–dehumidification (HDH), reverse osmosis (RO), and freeze-effect distillation.

Large solar desalination plants typically use indirect methods. Indirect solar desalination processes are categorized into single-phase processes (membrane based) and phase change processes (non-membrane based). Single-phase indirect solar desalination use photovoltaics or heat engines like Sterling or Rankine cycles to produce electricity that drive pumps. Phase-change (or multi-phase) solar desalination is not membrane-based.

==== Indirect single-phase ====
Indirect solar desalination systems using photovoltaic (PV) panels and reverse osmosis (RO) have been in use since 2009. Output by 2013 reached 1,600 litres (420 US gal) per hour per system, and 200 litres (53 US gal) per day per square metre of PV panel. Utirik Atoll in the Pacific Ocean has been supplied with fresh water this way since 2010.

Single-phase desalination processes include reverse osmosis and membrane distillation, where membranes filter water from contaminants. As of 2014 reverse osmosis (RO) made up about 52% of indirect methods. Pumps push salt water through RO modules at high pressure. RO systems depend on pressure differences. A pressure of 55–65 bar is required to purify seawater. An average of 5 kWh/m^{3} of energy is typically required to run a large-scale RO plant. Membrane distillation (MD) utilizes pressure difference from two sides of a microporous hydrophobic membrane. Fresh water can be extracted through four MD methods: direct contact (DCMD), air gap (AGMD), sweeping gas (SGMD) and vacuum (VMD). An estimated water cost of $15/m^{3} and $18/m^{3} support medium-scale solar-MD plants. Energy consumption ranges from 200 to 300 kWh/m^{3}.

==== Indirect multi-phase ====
Phase-change (or multi-phase) solar desalination includes multi-stage flash, multi-effect distillation, and thermal vapor compression. It is accomplished by using phase-change materials to maximize latent heat storage and high temperatures. MSF phase change temperatures range 80–120 °C, 40–100 °C for thermal vapor compression, and 50–90 °C for the MED method. Multi-stage flash (MSF) requires seawater to travel through a series of vacuumed reactors held at successively lower pressures. Heat is added to capture the latent heat of the vapor. As seawater flows through the reactors, steam is collected and is condensed to produce fresh water. In multi-effect distillation, seawater flows through successively low pressure vessels and reuses latent heat to evaporate seawater for condensation. Multi-effect distillation requires less energy than MSF due to higher efficiency in thermodynamic transfer rates.

===== Multi-stage flash distillation (MSF) =====
The multi-stage flash (MSF) method is a widely used technology for desalination, particularly in large-scale seawater desalination plants. It is based on the principle of utilizing the evaporation and condensation process to separate saltwater from freshwater.

In the MSF desalination process, seawater is heated and subjected to a series of flashings or rapid depressurizations in multiple stages. Each stage consists of a series of heat exchangers and flash chambers. The process typically involves the following steps:

1. Preheating: Seawater is initially preheated to reduce the energy required for subsequent stages. The preheated seawater then enters the first stage of the MSF system.
2. Flashing: In each stage, the preheated seawater is passed through a flash chamber, where its pressure is rapidly reduced. This sudden drop in pressure causes the water to flash into steam, leaving behind concentrated brine with high salt content.
3. Condensation: The steam produced in the flash chamber is then condensed on the surfaces of heat exchanger tubes. The condensation occurs as the steam comes into contact with colder seawater or with tubes carrying cool freshwater from previous stages.
4. Collection and extraction: The condensed freshwater is collected and collected as product water. It is then extracted from the system for storage and distribution, while the remaining brine is removed and disposed of properly.
5. Reheating and repetition: The brine from each stage is reheated, usually by steam extracted from the turbine that drives the process, and then introduced into the subsequent stage. This process is repeated in subsequent stages, with the number of stages determined by the desired level of freshwater production and the overall efficiency of the system.

The multi-stage flash (MSF) method, known for its high energy efficiency through the utilization of latent heat of vaporization during the flashing process, accounted for approximately 45% of the world's desalination capacity and a dominant 93% of thermal systems as recorded in 2009.

In Margherita di Savoia, Italy a 50–60 m^{3}/day MSF plant uses a salinity gradient solar pond. In El Paso, Texas a similar project produces 19 m^{3}/day. In Kuwait a MSF facility uses parabolic trough collectors to provide solar thermal energy to produce 100 m^{3} of fresh water a day. And in Northern China an experimental, automatic, unmanned operation uses 80 m^{2} of vacuum tube solar collectors coupled with a 1 kW wind turbine (to drive several small pumps) to produce 0.8 m^{3}/day.

MSF solar distillation has an output capacity of 6–60 L/m^{2}/day versus the 3–4 L/m^{2}/day standard output of a solar still. MSF experience poor efficiency during start-up or low energy periods. Achieving highest efficiency requires controlled pressure drops across each stage and steady energy input. As a result, solar applications require some form of thermal energy storage to deal with cloud interference, varying solar patterns, nocturnal operation, and seasonal temperature changes. As thermal energy storage capacity increases a more continuous process can be achieved and production rates approach maximum efficiency.

===== Indirect solar desalination by humidification/dehumidification =====
Indirect solar desalination by a form of humidification/dehumidification is in use in the seawater greenhouse.

===== Freezing =====
Although it has only been used on demonstration projects, this indirect method based on crystallization of the saline water has the advantage of the low energy required. Since the latent heat of fusion of water is 6,01 kJ/mole and the latent heat of vaporization at 100 °C is 40,66 kJ/mole, it should be cheaper in terms of energy cost. Furthermore, the corrosion risk is lower too. There is however a disadvantage related with the difficulties of mechanically moving mixtures of ice and liquid. The process has not been commercialized yet due to cost and difficulties with refrigeration systems.

The most studied way of using this process is the refrigeration freezing. A refrigeration cycle is used to cool the water stream to form ice, and after that those crystals are separated and melted to obtain fresh water. There are some recent examples of this solar powered processes: the unit constructed in Saudi Arabia by Chicago Bridge and Iron Inc. in the late 1980s, which was shut down for its inefficiency.

Nevertheless, there is a recent study for the saline groundwater concluding that a plant capable of producing 1 million gal/day would produce water at a cost of $1.30/1000 gallons. Being this true, it would be a cost-competitive device with the reverse osmosis ones.

== Technological developments ==
=== Delignified wood ===
The use of delignified wood structures coated with carbon nanotubes improves both water transport and localized heating efficiency, done by removing lignin and adding conductive coatings. Wood-based absorbers can channel water more effectively, reducing energy loss during evaporation. This method makes use of wood's natural capillary channels, which serve as small water transport pathways. These channels become more absorbent when lignin is removed, speeding up capillary actions that push water upward. After efficiently absorbing sunlight, carbon nanotubes covering the channels transform it into heat that stays condensed at the evaporation surface instead of spreading through the water. This isolated heating allows for larger freshwater output under the same sunlight conditions while substantially reducing energy waste. The cost-effective and renewable nature of delignified-wood-based solar vaporizers make them a sustainable choice for large-scale desal.

=== Materials ===
Carbon-enhanced photocatalysts quicken the process of removing salt and organic pollutants by using a "dopamine electronic bridge" to more efficiently trap visible light. This bridge functions as a conductive connection that helps move electrons between the carbon material and the photocatalyst surface, which accelerates breakdown.

Photothermal materials can be more cost-effective. Substances such as, carbon black, biochar, and metal oxide combinations offer significant thermal conductivity and evaporation rates at affordable costs.

A porous, hollow multishelled structure (HoMS) interlocked to a polymer molecular chain yields a three-dimensional (3D) photothermal structure using solvents based on Hansen solubility parameters. The polymers precisely threaded through the HoMS, leading to uniform nanomaterial loading and creating a hierarchical "nanoforest". This structure exhibited 90.2% broadband solar absorption and reduced energy consumption of evaporation by 45.7%, achieving a record-high stable evaporation rate of 38.14 ± 0.57 kg/m^{2}/hr. A 0.75 m^{2} device produced 20.16 l of freshwater per day under natural sunlight.

=== Convection ===
Contrast in temperature and density between warm and cool air can drive convection. In systems such as passive cooling-tower-integrated systems, hot air from the evaporator travels through the tower and cools, creating droplets on insulated surfaces. This allows the tower to constantly supply fresh water even without external power. Such designs are reported to produce water throughout the day and night, with greater yield and less lost heat than basic solar stills.

== Case studies ==
Solar desalination has gone from small experiments to vast operating systems. Portuguese researchers have studied solar-thermal evaporators and photovoltaic-powered reverse osmosis systems in coast regions such as Peniche and Algarve. The purpose of these experiments is to figure out how the area's long term costs, stability, and energy efficiency would differ with varying amounts of sunlight. Researchers realized that solar-powered reverse osmosis systems can use less energy than a normal grid-powered system and use local sunlight for benefit. The study also discovered that the cost per cubic meter of water produced and the output quality was significantly affected by the system's capacity and certain times of the year. At busy times, such as summer, solar-powered systems helped keep the cost down, however, in the winter they needed more storage and energy to function. This study also found that solar desalination would positively impact Portugal's coastal areas if it received help from economic subsidies, stronger storage designs, and constant technological advancements.

Countries located in the Middle East and North Africa (MENA), such as Saudi Arabia, Morocco, and the United Arab Emirates are beginning to use more sustainable energy to create desalination foundations. Researchers state that the use of solar desalination has become more popular in energy-storage or hybrid power systems, which continue to work even when the sun is not shining. These hybrid systems are seemingly good for the environment since they lower greenhouse gas emissions and provide those found in remote desert areas with a source of fresh water. The Al Khafji solar-PV reverse plant in Saudi Arabia is a great example of this situation. Being one of the largest solar desalination plants on earth it makes millions of gallons of drinking water daily while using less electricity than other systems that are connected to the grid.

== Single-phase solar desalination ==
In indirect/single phase solar-powered desalination, a solar energy collection system (e.g. photovoltaic panels) is combined with a desalination system such as reverse osmosis (RO). The main single-phase processes consist of RO and electrodialysis (ED). Nearly 70% of the 15,000+ desalination plants around the world use RO, comprising 44% of desalination.

=== Reverse osmosis ===
RO is the most common desalination process due to its efficiency, despite the need for water pre-treatment. Most references to indirect solar RO refer to PV systems, although grid-connected CSP systems can also power RO, such as the solar towers powering grid-connected RO in Dubai (e.g. the Mohammed bin Rashid Al Maktoum Solar Park) and Spain (e.g. the Plataforma Solar de Almería). Energy efficiency comparisons report that high-temperature solar-powered RO systems are more energy efficient than PV-RO, although PV-powered systems typically win on cost.

PV-powered RO desalination is common in demonstration plants due to its modularity and scalability. Economic and reliability considerations are the main challenges to improving them. Plummeting PV panel costs improve the argument for solar-powered desalination. One economic analysis explored an optimisation strategy of PV-powered RO and reported favorable results.

PV converts solar radiation into direct-current (DC) electricity, which powers the pumps of RO systems, often requiring conversion to AC current. The intermittent nature of sunlight and its variable intensity throughout the day complicates PV efficiency prediction and limits night-time desalination. Studies have indicated that intermittent operations can increase biofouling.

Batteries can store solar energy for later use. Alternatively, thermal energy storage systems ensure constant performance after sunset and on cloudy days. However, batteries remain expensive and require ongoing maintenance. Also, storing and retrieving energy from the battery lowers efficiency.

Reported average cost of RO desalination is US$0.56/m^{3}. Using renewable energy, that cost could increase up to US$16/m^{3}., but the claimed record for cheapest solar-RO is $0.37/m^{3}, assisted by tariff rates.

=== Electrodialysis ===
Both electrodialysis (ED) and reverse electrodialysis (RED) use selective ion transport through ion exchange membranes (IEMs) due either to the influence of concentration difference (RED) or electrical potential (ED).

In ED, an electrical force is applied to the electrodes; the cations travel toward the cathode and anions travel toward the anode. The exchange membranes only allow the passage of its permeable type (cation or anion), hence with this arrangement, diluted and concentrated salt solutions are placed in the space between the membranes (channels). The configuration of this stack can be either horizontal or vertical. The feed water passes in parallel through all the cells, providing a continuous flow of permeate and brine. Although this is a well-known process electrodialysis is not commercially suited for seawater desalination, because it can be used only for brackish water (TDS < 1000 ppm). Due to the complexity for modeling ion transport phenomena in the channels, performance could be affected, considering the non-ideal behavior presented by the exchange membranes.

The basic ED process could be modified and turned into RED, in which the polarity of the electrodes changes periodically, reversing the flow through the membranes. This limits the deposition of colloidal substances, which makes this a self-cleaning process, almost eliminating the need for chemical pre-treatment, making it economically attractive for brackish water.

The use ED systems began in 1954, while RED was developed in the 1970s. These processes are used in over 1100 plants worldwide. The main advantages of PV in desalination plants is due to its suitability for small-scale plants. One example is in Japan, on Oshima Island (Nagasaki), which has operated since 1986 with 390 PV panels producing 10 m^{3}/day with dissolved solids (TDS) about 400 ppm.

== Environmental benefits ==
Environmental evaluations prove that solar desalination usually has less of a carbon footprint than traditional thermal desalination centers. A recent life-cycle analysis explains that greenhouse gas emissions from solar-driven multi-effect desalination could be almost halved in comparison to systems that run on fossil fuels.

Newer systems that use cooling towers have the ability to run at all times without external powers, lessening emissions and waste even more. As the salinity of the brine is released, these systems cool, protecting marine ecosystems that are nearby.

== See also ==
- Point Paterson Desalination Plant
