= Electrodialysis =

Applied electric potential transport of salt ions

Electrodialysis (ED) is used to transport salt ions from one solution through ion-exchange membranes to another solution using an applied electric potential difference. This is done in a configuration called an electrodialysis cell. The cell consists of a feed (dilute) compartment and a concentrate (brine) compartment formed by an anion exchange membrane and a cation exchange membrane placed between two electrodes. In almost all practical electrodialysis processes, multiple electrodialysis cells are arranged into a configuration called an electrodialysis stack, with alternating anion and cation-exchange membranes forming the multiple electrodialysis cells. Electrodialysis processes are different from distillation techniques and other membrane based processes (such as reverse osmosis (RO)) in that dissolved species are moved away from the feed stream, whereas other processes move away the water from the remaining substances. Because the quantity of dissolved species in the feed stream is far less than that of the fluid, electrodialysis offers the practical advantage of much higher feed recovery in many applications.

== Method ==
In an electrodialysis stack, the dilute (D) feed stream, brine or concentrate (C) stream, and electrode (E) stream are allowed to flow through the appropriate cell compartments formed by the ion-exchange membranes. Under the influence of an electrical potential difference, the negatively charged ions (e.g., chloride) in the dilute stream migrate toward the positively charged anode. These ions pass through the positively charged anion-exchange membrane, but are prevented from further migration toward the anode by the negatively charged cation-exchange membrane and therefore stay in the C stream, which becomes concentrated with the anions. The positively charged species (e.g., sodium) in the D stream migrate toward the negatively charged cathode and pass through the negatively charged cation-exchange membrane. These cations also stay in the C stream, prevented from further migration toward the cathode by the positively charged anion-exchange membrane. As a result of the anion and cation migration, electric current flows between the cathode and anode. Only an equal number of anion and cation charge equivalents are transferred from the D stream into the C stream and so the charge balance is maintained in each stream. The overall result of the electrodialysis process is an ion concentration increase in the concentrate stream with a depletion of ions in the dilute solution feed stream.

The E stream is the electrode stream that flows past each electrode in the stack. This stream may consist of the same composition as the feed stream (e.g., sodium chloride) or may be a separate solution containing a different species (e.g., sodium sulfate). The E stream is usually employed to prevent the reduction and/or oxidation of salt ions from the feed into the electrode plates. Depending on the stack configuration, anions and cations from the electrode stream may be transported into the C stream, or anions and cations from the D stream may be transported into the E stream. In each case, this transport is necessary to carry current across the stack and maintain electrically neutral stack solutions.

== Anode and cathode reactions ==
Reactions take place at each electrode. At the cathode,

2e^{−} + 2 H_{2}O → H_{2} (g) + 2 OH^{−}

while at the anode,

H_{2}O → 2 H^{+} + 1/2 O_{2} (g) + 2e^{−} or 2 Cl^{−} → Cl_{2} (g) + 2e^{−}

Small amounts of hydrogen gas are generated at the cathode and small amounts of either oxygen or chlorine gas (depending on composition of the E stream and end ion-exchange membrane arrangement) at the anode. These gases are typically subsequently dissipated as the E stream effluent from each electrode compartment is combined to maintain a neutral pH and discharged or re-circulated to a separate E tank. However, some (e.g.,) have proposed collection of hydrogen gas for use in energy production.

== Efficiency ==
Current efficiency is a measure of how effective ions are transported across the ion-exchange membranes for a given applied current. Typically current efficiencies >80% are desirable in commercial stacks to minimize energy operating costs. Low current efficiencies indicate water splitting in the diluate or concentrate streams, shunt currents between the electrodes, or back-diffusion of ions from the concentrate to the diluate could be occurring.

Current efficiency is calculated according to:

$$\xi=\frac{zFQ_f (C_{inlet}^d - C_{outlet}^d)}{N I}$$

where

$\xi$ = current utilization efficiency

$z$ = charge of the ion

$F$ = Faraday constant, 96,485 Amp-s/mol

$Q_f$ = dilute flow rate, L/s

$C_{inlet}^d$ = dilute ED cell inlet concentration, mol/L

$C_{outlet}^d$ = dilute ED cell outlet concentration, mol/L

$N$ = number of cell pairs

$I$ = current, Amps.

Current efficiency is generally a function of feed concentration.

As electrodialysis works by transporting salt ions from the diluted channels to the concentrated channels, energy consumption greatly increases as the feed salt concentration increases. Seawater desalination is usually more energy efficient by reverse osmosis than electrodialysis. However, for water streams with lower salt concentration electrodialysis may be the most energy efficient process. Additionally, water streams with very high salt concentrations, that cannot be separated by reverse osmosis, can be concentrated by electrodialysis up to concentrations near to saturation. This is very useful for Zero Liquid Discharge treatments, providing a reduction in energy consumption compared to evaporation.

== Applications ==
In application, electrodialysis systems can be operated as continuous production or batch production processes. In a continuous process, feed is passed through a sufficient number of stacks placed in series to produce the final desired product quality. In batch processes, the diluate and/or concentrate streams are re-circulated through the electrodialysis systems until the final product or concentrate quality is achieved.

Electrodialysis is usually applied to deionization of aqueous solutions. However, desalting of sparingly conductive aqueous organic and organic solutions is also possible. Some applications of electrodialysis include:

- Large scale brackish and seawater desalination and salt production.
- Small and medium scale drinking water production (e.g., towns & villages, construction & military camps, nitrate reduction, hotels & hospitals)
- Water reuse (e.g., desalination brine treatment, industrial laundry wastewater, produced water from oil/gas production, cooling tower makeup & blowdown, metals industry fluids, wash-rack water)
- Pre-demineralization (e.g., boiler makeup & pretreatment, ultrapure water pretreatment, process water desalination, power generation, semiconductor, chemical manufacturing, food and beverage)
- Food processing
- Agricultural water (e.g., water for greenhouses, hydroponics, irrigation, livestock)
- Glycol desalting (e.g., antifreeze / engine-coolants, capacitor electrolyte fluids, oil and gas dehydration, conditioning and processing solutions, industrial heat transfer fluids, secondary coolants from heating, venting, and air conditioning (HVAC))
- Glycerin purification
- Acid and base regeneration from salts
- Recovery of valuable dissolved substances from wastewater
- Zero Liquid Discharge (ZLD)

The major application of electrodialysis has historically been the desalination of brackish water or seawater as an alternative to RO for potable water production and seawater concentration for salt production (primarily in Japan). In normal potable water production without the requirement of high recoveries, reverse osmosis is generally believed to be more cost-effective when total dissolved solids (TDS) are 3,000 parts per million (ppm) or greater, while electrodialysis is more cost-effective for TDS feed concentrations less than 3,000 ppm or when high recoveries of the feed are required.

Another important application for electrodialysis is the production of pure water and ultrapure water by electrodeionization (EDI). In EDI, the purifying compartments and sometimes the concentrating compartments of the electrodialysis stack are filled with ion-exchange resin. When fed with low TDS feed (e.g., feed purified by RO), the product can reach very high purity levels (e.g., 18 MΩ-cm). The ion-exchange resins act to retain the ions, allowing these to be transported across the ion-exchange membranes. The main usage of EDI systems are in electronics, pharmaceutical, power generation, and cooling tower applications.

Electrodialysis can adapt to intermittent energy input and voltage variations, so it can be easily coupled to renewable electricity sources

== Selective electrodialysis ==
Selective electrodialysis uses selective ion-exchange membranes to concentrate only some ions, whereas other species remain in the diluted channel. Selective electrodialysis is usually done by employing monovalent anion and/or cation exchange membranes, that only allows migration of monovalent anion or cations, respectively. This is useful when only monovalent ions are required to be separated, reducing electricity consumption and desalination time. For example, this is useful for irrigation water. Monovalent cations usually are particularly (Na^{+}, Cl^{−}) harmful for crops, whereas most divalent ions (Ca^{+2}, Mg^{+2}, SO^{4-}_{2}) are beneficial nutrients for plants. Therefore, monovalent selective electrodialysis may provide water with an ideal composition for agriculture, reducing the necessity for minerals fertilization.

== Limitations ==
Electrodialysis has inherent limitations, working best at removing low molecular weight ionic components from a feed stream. Non-charged, higher molecular weight, and less mobile ionic species will not typically be significantly removed. Also, in contrast to RO, electrodialysis becomes less economical when extremely low salt concentrations in the product are required and with sparingly conductive feeds: current density becomes limited and current utilization efficiency typically decreases as the feed salt concentration becomes lower, and with fewer ions in solution to carry current, both ion transport and energy efficiency greatly declines. Consequently, comparatively large membrane areas are required to satisfy capacity requirements for low concentration (and sparingly conductive) feed solutions. Innovative systems overcoming the inherent limitations of electrodialysis (and RO) are available; these integrated systems work synergistically, with each sub-system operating in its optimal range, providing the least overall operating and capital costs for a particular application.

As with RO, electrodialysis systems may require feed pretreatment to remove species that coat, precipitate onto, or otherwise "foul" the surface of the ion-exchange membranes. This fouling decreases the efficiency of the electrodialysis system. Species of concern include calcium and magnesium hardness, suspended solids, silica, and organic compounds. Water softening can be used to remove hardness, and micrometre or multimedia filtration can be used to remove suspended solids. Hardness in particular is a concern since scaling can build up on the membranes. However, electrodialysis can support higher concentrations of those foulants than reverse osmosis. In addition, electrodialysis membranes, as they have rectangular shape, can be removed from the stack and cleaned, whereas reverse osmosis membranes can't be cleaned that way because of their spiral geometry. Various chemicals are also available to help prevent scaling. Also, electrodialysis reversal systems seek to minimize scaling by periodically reversing the flows of diluate and concentrate and polarity of the electrodes.

== See also ==
- Salinity gradient power
- Water desalination
- Electrodialysis reversal
- Electrochemical engineering
- Reverse osmosis
- Proton-exchange membrane

== Bibliography ==
- Inamuddin (2017-06-01). Applications of Adsorption and Ion Exchange Chromatography in Waste Water Treatment. Materials Research Forum LLC. ISBN 978-1-945291-33-3.
