= Seawater greenhouse =

Greenhouse technology for arid regions

A seawater greenhouse is a greenhouse structure that enables the growth of crops and the production of fresh water in arid regions. Arid regions constitute about one third of the Earth's land area. Seawater greenhouse technology aims to mitigate issues such as global water scarcity, peak water and soil becoming salted. The system uses seawater and solar energy, and has a similar structure to the pad-and-fan greenhouse, but with additional evaporators and condensers.

The seawater is pumped into the greenhouse to create a cool and humid environment, the optimal conditions for the cultivation of temperate crops. The freshwater is produced in a condensed state created by the solar desalination principle, which removes salt and impurities. The remaining humidified air is expelled from the greenhouse and used to improve growing conditions for outdoor plants.

== Projects ==
=== Seawater Greenhouse Ltd ===
The seawater greenhouse concept was first researched and developed in 1991 by Charlie Paton's company Light Works Ltd, which is now known as the Seawater Greenhouse Ltd. Charlie Paton and Philip Davies worked on the first pilot project commenced in 1992, on the Canary Island of Tenerife. A prototype seawater greenhouse was assembled in the UK and constructed on the site in Tenerife covering an area of 360 m^{2}. The temperate crops successfully cultivated included tomatoes, spinach, dwarf peas, peppers, artichokes, French beans, and lettuce.

The second pilot design was installed in 2000 on the coast of Al-Aryam Island, Abu Dhabi, United Arab Emirates. The design is a light steel structure, similar to a multi-span polytunnel, which relies purely on solar energy. A pipe array is installed to improve the design of the greenhouse by decreasing the temperature and increasing the freshwater production. The greenhouse has an area of 864 m^{2} and has a daily water production of 1 m^{3}, which nearly meets the crop's irrigation demand.

The third pilot seawater greenhouse, which is 864 m^{2}, is near Muscat in Oman which produces 0.3 to 0.6 m^{3} of freshwater per day. This project was created as a collaboration between Sultan Qaboos University. It provides an opportunity to develop a sustainable horticultural sector on the Batinah coast. These projects have enabled the validation of a thermodynamic simulation model which, given appropriate meteorological data, accurately predicts and quantifies how the seawater greenhouse will perform in other parts of the world.

The fourth project is the commercial installation in Port Augusta, Australia, installed in 2010. It is currently a 20 hectare seawater greenhouse owned and run by Sundrop Farms which has developed it further.

The fifth design was constructed in 2017 in Berbera, Somaliland. The design was researched to be simplified and inexpensive with advanced greenhouse modeling techniques. This design includes a shading system which retains core evaporative cooling elements.

=== Sahara Forest Project ===
The Sahara Forest Project (SFP) combines the seawater greenhouse technology and concentrated solar power and constructed pilot projects in Jordan and Qatar. The seawater greenhouse evaporates 50 m^{3} of seawater and harvests 5 m^{3} of fresh water per hectare per day. The solar power production capacity through PV panels produces 39 kW on the 3 hectares area with 1350 m^{2} growing area. The greenhouses are 15 degrees cooler than the outside temperatures which enables the production up to 130,000 of kg of vegetables per year and up to 20,000 liters of fresh water per day. The project includes revegetation by soil reclamation of nitrogen-fixing and salt-removing desert plants by repurposed waste products from agriculture and saltwater evaporation.

== Process ==
A seawater greenhouse uses the surrounding environment to grow temperate crops and produce freshwater. A conventional greenhouse uses solar heat to create a warmer environment to allow adequate growing temperature, whereas the seawater greenhouse does the opposite by creating a cooler environment. The roof traps infrared heat, while allowing visible light through to promote photosynthesis.

The design for cooling the microclimate primarily consists of humidification and dehumidification (HD) desalination process or multiple-effect humidification. A simple seawater greenhouse consists of two evaporative coolers (evaporators), a condenser, fans, seawater and distilled water pipes and crops in between the two evaporators. This is shown in schematic figures 1 and 2.

Figure 1. Front of Seawater Greenhouse on coast, Tenerife, August 2011	Figure 2. Back of Seawater Greenhouse on coast, Tenerife, August 2011

The process recreates the natural hydrological cycle within a controlled environment of the greenhouse by evaporating water from saline water source and regains it as freshwater by condensation. The first part of the system uses seawater, an evaporator, and a condenser. The front wall of the greenhouse consists of a seawater-wetted evaporator which faces the prevailing wind. These are mostly constituted of corrugated cardboard shown in Figure 3.

If the wind is not prevalent enough, fans blow the outside air through the evaporator into the greenhouse. The ambient warm air exchanges the heat with the seawater which cools it down and gets it humidified. The cool and humid air creates an adequate growing environment for the crops. The remaining evaporatively-cooled seawater is collected and pumped to the condenser as a coolant.

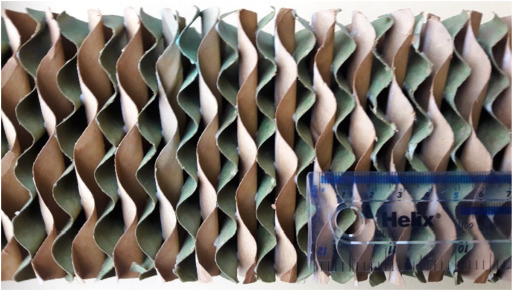
Figure 3: Seawater Greenhouse Cardboard

The second part of the system has another evaporator. The seawater flows from the first evaporator which preheats it and thereafter flows through the solar thermal collector on the roof to heat it up sufficiently before it flows to the second evaporator. The seawater, or coolant, flows through a circuit consisting of the evaporators, solar heating pipe, and condenser with an intake of seawater and an output of fresh water.

The fresh water is produced by hot and relatively high humidity air which can produce sufficient distilled water for irrigation. The volume of fresh water is determined by air temperature, relative humidity, solar radiation and the airflow rate. These conditions can be modeled with appropriate meteorological data, enabling the design and process to be optimized for any suitable location.

== Applicability ==
The technique is applicable to sites in arid regions near the sea. The distance and elevation from the sea must be evaluated considering the energy required to pump water to the site. There are numerous suitable locations on the coasts; others are below sea level, such as the Dead Sea and the Qattara Depression, where hydro schemes have been proposed to exploit the hydraulic pressure to generate power, e.g., Red Sea–Dead Sea Canal.

== Studies ==
In 1996, Paton and Davies used the Simulink toolkit under MATLAB to model forced ventilation of the greenhouse in Tenerife, Cape Verde, Namibia, and Oman. The greenhouse is assisted by the prevailing wind, evaporative cooling, transpiration, solar heating, heat transfer through the walls and roof, and condensation which is analyzed in the study. They found that the amount of water required by the plants is reduced by 80% and 2.6–6.4 kWh electrical energy is needed for m3 of fresh water produced.

In 2005, Paton and Davis evaluated design options with thermal modeling using the United Arab Emirates model as a baseline. They studied three options: perforated screen, C-shaped air path, and pipe array, to find a better seawater circuit to cool the environment and produce the most freshwater. The study found that a pipe array gave the best results: an air temperature decrease of 1 °C, a mean radiant temperature decrease of 7.5 °C, and a freshwater production increase of 63%. This can be implemented to improve seawater greenhouses in hot arid regions such as the second pilot design in the United Arab Emirates.

In 2018, Paton and Davis researched brine utilization for cooling and salt production in wind-driven seawater greenhouses to design and model it. The brine disposed by the seawater desalination may disturb the ecosystem as the same amount of brine is produced as freshwater. By using the brine valoristation method of wind-driven air flow by cooling the greenhouse with seawater evaporation, salt can be produced as shown in Figure 4. This brine is the by-product of the freshwater production, but can also be the ingredient to make salt, making it into a product that can be merchandised.

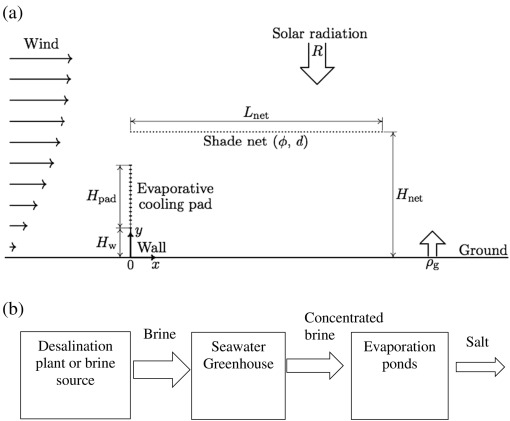
Figure 4: basic concept of seawater greenhouse for brine utilisation.

An additional finding of this research was the importance of the shade-net which is modelled by a thin film in the study shown in Figure 5. It not only provides cooling, but also elongates the cooling plume by containing the cold air plume from the evaporative cooling pad.

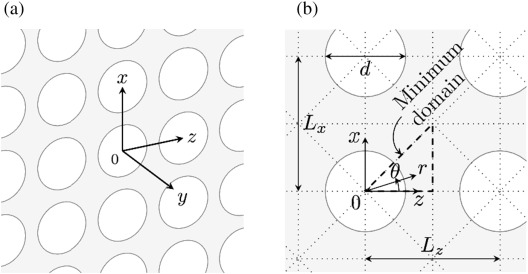
Figure 5: Geometric model of shade net for pressure drop determination showing (a) local co-ordinate system and (b) symmetry planes (dotted lines) used to simplify modelling.

== See also ==
- Agroforestry
- Climate change adaptation
- Concentrated solar power
- Desertec
- Ecological engineering
- Evaporation pond
- Evaporite
- Green Sahara
- IBTS Greenhouse
- Open-pan salt making
- Peak water
- Saltern
- Solar desalination
- Solar humidification
- Water scarcity
