= Vapor-compression desalination =

Vapor-compression desalination (VC) refers to a distillation process where the evaporation of sea or saline water is obtained by the application of heat delivered by compressed vapor.

== Overview ==
Since compression of the vapor increases both the pressure and temperature of the vapor, it is possible to use the latent heat rejected during condensation to generate additional vapor. The effect of compressing water vapor can be done by two methods.

The first method utilizes an ejector system motivated by steam at manometric pressure from an external source in order to recycle vapor from the desalination process. The form is designated ejectocompression or thermocompression.

Using the second method, water vapor is compressed by means of a mechanical device, electrically driven in most cases. This form is designated mechanical vapor compression (MVC). The MVC process comprises two different versions: vapor compression (VC), and vacuum vapor compression (VVC). VC designates those systems in which the evaporation effect takes place at manometric pressure, and VVC the systems in which evaporation takes place at sub-atmospheric pressures (under vacuum).

The compression is mechanically powered by something such as a compression turbine. As vapor is generated, it is passed over to a heat exchanging condenser which returns the vapor to water. The resulting fresh water is moved to storage while the heat removed during condensation is transmitted to the remaining feedstock.

The VVC process is the most efficient distillation process available in the market today in terms of energy consumption and water recovery ratio. As the system is electrically driven, it is considered a "clean" process which is highly reliable and simple to operate and maintain.

== See also ==
- Marine vapor-compression distillers
- Vapor-compression evaporation
