= Multiple-effect distillation =

Separation process used to purify sea water

Multiple-effect distillation or multi-effect distillation (MED) is a distillation process often used for sea water desalination. It consists of multiple stages or "effects". In each stage, the feed water is heated by steam in tubes, usually by spraying saline water onto them. Some of the water evaporates, and this steam flows into the tubes of the next stage (effect), heating and evaporating more water. Each stage essentially reuses the energy from the previous stage, with successively lower temperatures and pressures after each one. There are different configurations, such as forward-feed, backward-feed, etc. Additionally, between stages this steam uses some heat to preheat incoming saline water.

== Operating principles ==
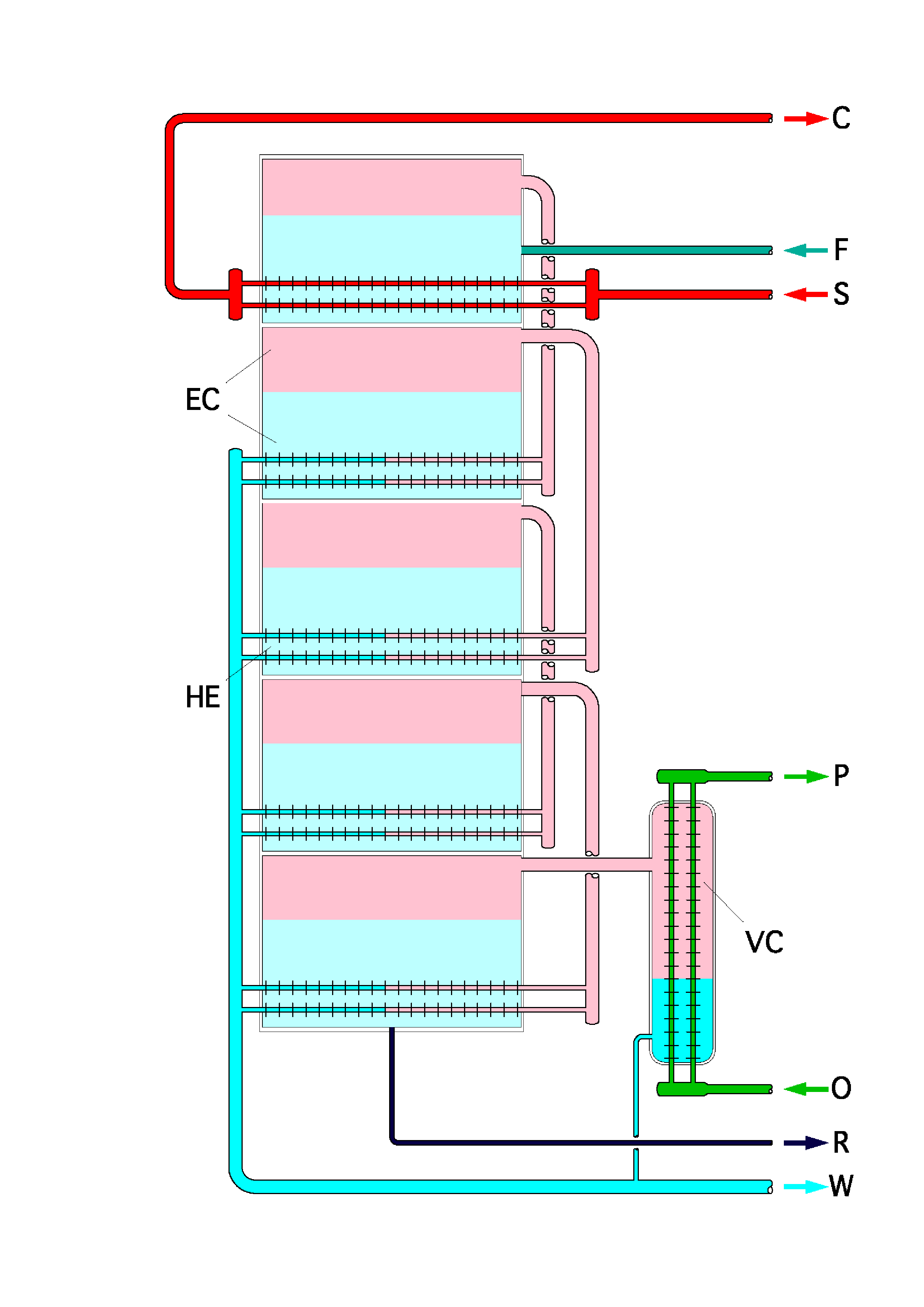
Schematic of a multiple effect desalination plant. The first stage is at the top. Pink areas are vapor, lighter blue areas are liquid feed water. Stronger turquoise is condensate. It is not shown how feed water enters other stages than the first. F – feed water in. S – heating steam in. C – heating steam out. W – Fresh water (condensate) out. R – brine out. O – coolant in. P – coolant out. VC is the last-stage cooler.

The plant can be seen as a sequence of closed spaces separated by tube walls, with a heat source in one end and a heat sink in the other end. Each space consists of two communicating subspaces, the exterior of the tubes of stage n and the interior of the tubes in stage n+1. Each space has a lower temperature and pressure than the previous space, and the tube walls have intermediate temperatures between the temperatures of the fluids on each side. The pressure in a space cannot be in equilibrium with the temperatures of the walls of both subspaces. It has an intermediate pressure. Then the pressure is too low or the temperature too high in the first subspace, and the water evaporates. In the second subspace, the pressure is too high or the temperature too low, and the vapor condenses. This carries evaporation energy from the warmer first subspace to the colder second subspace. At the second subspace, the energy flows by conduction through the tube walls to the colder next space.

== Trade-offs ==
The thinner the metal in the tubes and the thinner the layers of liquid on either side of the tube walls, the more efficient is the energy transport from space to space. Introducing more stages between the heat source and sink reduces the temperature difference between the spaces and greatly reduces the heat transport per unit surface of the tubes. The energy supplied is reused more times to evaporate more water, but the process takes more time. The amount of water distilled per stage is directly proportional to the amount of energy transport. If the transport is slowed down, one can increase the surface area per stage, i.e. the number and length of the tubes, at the expense of increased installation cost.

The salt water collected at the bottom of each stage can be sprayed on the tubes in the next stage, since this water has a suitable temperature and pressure near or slightly above the operating temperature and pressure in the next stage. Some of this water will flash into steam as it is released into the next stage at lower pressure than the stage it came from.

The first and last stages need external heating and cooling, respectively. The amount of heat removed from the last stage must nearly equal the amount of heat supplied to the first stage. For seawater desalination, even the first and warmest stage is typically operated at a temperature below 70–75 °C, to avoid scale formation.

The lowest pressure stages need relatively more surface area to achieve the same energy transport across the tube walls. The expense of installing this surface area limits the usefulness of using very low pressures and temperatures in the later stages. Gases dissolved in the feed water may contribute to reducing the pressure differentials if they are allowed to accumulate in the stages.

External feed water must be supplied to the first stage. The tubes of the first stage are heated using an external source of steam or though any other source of heat.

Condensate (fresh water) from all the tubes in all the stages must be pumped out from the respective pressures of the stages to the ambient pressure. The brine collected at the bottom of the last stage must be pumped out, since it has substantially lower pressure than the ambient pressure.

== Advantages ==
- Low energy consumption compared to other thermal processes
- Operates at low temperature (< 70 °C) and at low concentration (< 1.5) to avoid corrosion and scaling
- Does not need pre-treatment of sea water and tolerates variations in sea water conditions
- Highly reliable and simple to operate
- Low maintenance cost
- 24-hour-a-day continuous operation with minimum supervision
- Can be adapted to any heat source, including hot water, waste heat from power generation, industrial processes, or solar heating.
- Produce steadily high purity distillate.

== Disadvantages ==
- Incompatible with higher temperature heat sources due to scaling issues during spray evaporation.
- Difficult to scale down to small sizes due to complexity and large numbers of parts required.

== See also ==
- Multiple-effect evaporator
- Multi-stage flash distillation
