= Multi-stage flash distillation =

Water desalination process

Multi-stage flash distillation (MSF) is a water desalination process that distills sea water by flashing a portion of the water into steam in multiple stages of what are essentially countercurrent heat exchangers. Current MSF facilities may have as many as 30 stages.

Multi-stage flash distillation plants produce about 26% of all desalinated water in the world. Almost all new desalination plants use reverse osmosis due to much lower energy consumption.

== Principle ==
A schematic of a 5 stage 'once-through' multi-stage flash desalinator. Practical systems frequently have many more stages. A – Steam in B – Seawater in C – Potable water out D – Brine out (waste) E – Condensate out F – Heat exchange G – Condensation collection H – Brine heater

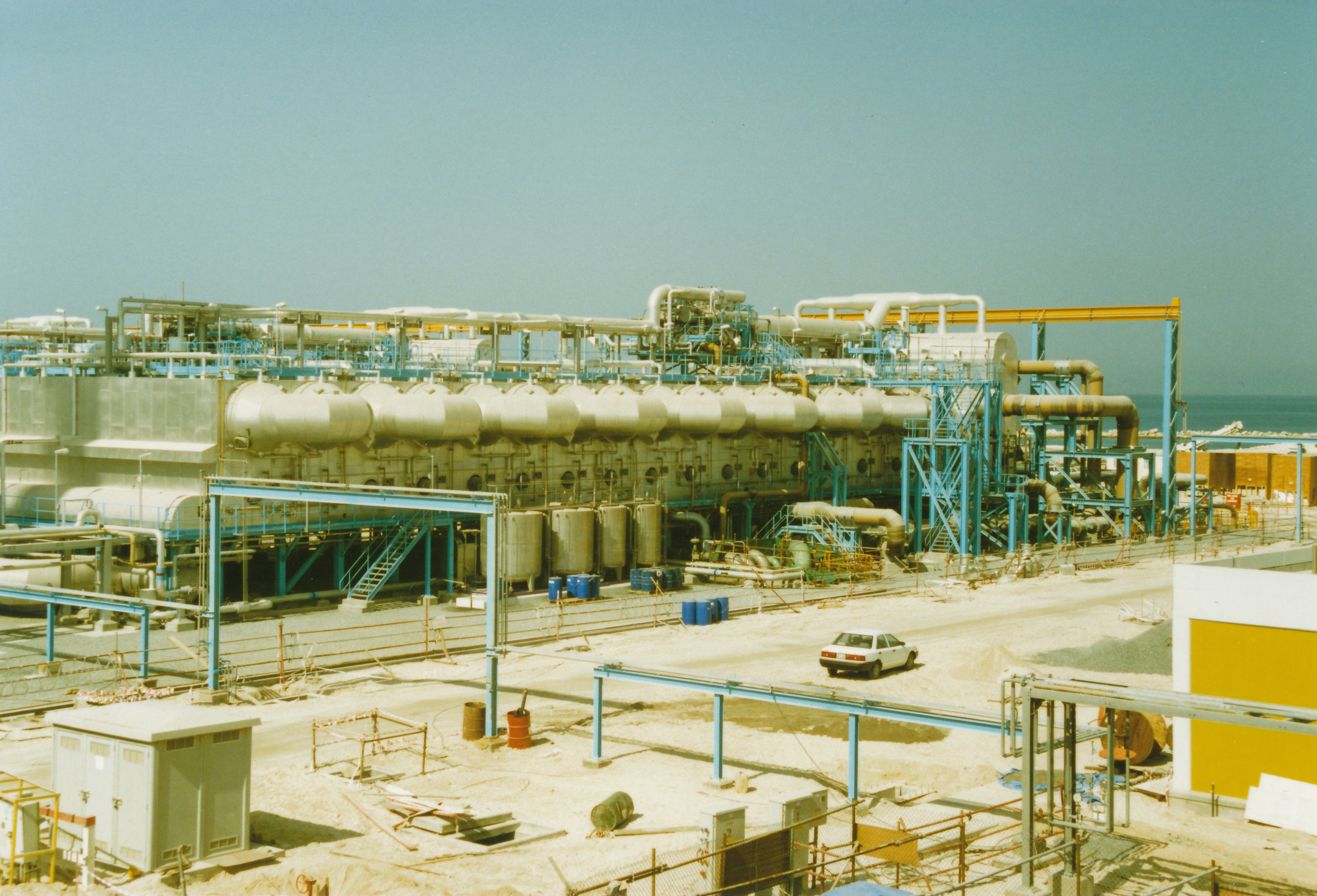
The MSF Desalination Plant at Jebel Ali G Station, Dubai

The plant has a series of spaces called stages, each containing a heat exchanger and a condensate collector. The sequence has a cold end and a hot end while intermediate stages have intermediate temperatures. The stages have different pressures corresponding to the boiling points of water at the stage temperatures. After the hot end there is a container called the brine heater.

The process goes through the following steps:

1. When the plant is operating in steady state, feed water at the cold inlet temperature flows, or is pumped, through the heat exchangers in stages and warms up.
2. When it reaches the brine heater, it already has nearly the maximum temperature; additional heat is added.
3. After the heater, the water flows through valves back into the stages that have ever lower pressure and temperature.
4. The water that flows back through the stages is called brine, to distinguish it from the inlet water. As the brine enters each stage, its temperature is above the boiling point at the pressure of the stage, and a small fraction of the brine water boils ("flashes") to steam thereby reducing the temperature until an equilibrium is reached.
5. The resulting steam is a little hotter than the feed water in the heat exchanger.
6. The steam cools and condenses against the heat exchanger tubes, thereby heating the feed water as described earlier.

The total evaporation in all the stages is up to approximately 85% of the water flowing through the system, depending on the range of temperatures used. With increasing temperature, there are growing difficulties of scale formation and corrosion; 110–120 °C appears to be a maximum, although scale avoidance may require temperatures below 70 °C.

The feed water carries away the latent heat of the condensed steam, maintaining the low temperature of the stage. The pressure in the chamber remains constant as equal amounts of steam are formed when new warm brine enters the stage and steam is removed as it condenses on the tubes of the heat exchanger. The equilibrium is stable, because if at some point more vapor forms, the pressure increases, reduces evaporation, and increases condensation.

In the final stage, the brine and the condensate has a temperature near the inlet temperature. Then the brine and condensate are pumped out from the low pressure in the stage to the ambient pressure. The brine and condensate still carry a small amount of heat that is lost from the system when they are discharged. The heat that was added in the heater makes up for this loss.

The heat added in the brine heater usually comes in the form of hot steam from an industrial process co-located with the desalination plant. The steam is allowed to condense against tubes carrying the brine (similar to the stages).

The energy that makes the evaporation possible is present in the brine as it leaves the heater. The reason for letting the evaporation happen in multiple stages rather than a single stage at the lowest pressure and temperature, is that in a single stage, the feed water would warm only to an intermediate temperature between the inlet temperature and the heater, while much of the steam would not condense and the stage would not maintain the lowest pressure and temperature.

Such plants can operate at 23–27 kWh/m^{3} (appr. 90 MJ/m^{3}) of distilled water.

Because the colder salt water entering the process counterflows with the saline waste water/distilled water, relatively little heat energy leaves in the outflow. Most of the heat is picked up by the colder saline water flowing toward the heater, thereby recycling the energy.

MSF distillation plants, especially large ones, are often paired with power plants in a cogeneration configuration. Waste heat from the power plant is used to heat the seawater, providing cooling for the power plant at the same time. This reduces the energy needed by half to two-thirds, which drastically alters the economics of the plant, since energy is by far the largest operating cost of MSF plants. Reverse osmosis, MSF distillation's main competitor, requires more pretreatment of the seawater and more maintenance, as well as energy in the form of work (electricity, mechanical power) as opposed to cheaper low-grade waste heat.

== See also ==
- Marine flash distillers
- Multi-effect distillation
- Multiple-effect distillation
- Reverse osmosis
- Reverse osmosis plant
- Regenerative heat exchanger
