= Membrane =

Thin, film-like structure separating two fluids, acting as a selective barrier

Schematic of size-based membrane exclusion

A membrane is a selective barrier; it allows some things to pass through but stops others. Such things may be molecules, ions, or other small particles. Membranes can be generally classified into synthetic membranes and biological membranes. Biological membranes include cell membranes (outer coverings of cells or organelles that allow passage of certain constituents); nuclear membranes, which cover a cell nucleus; and tissue membranes, such as mucosae and serosae. Synthetic membranes are made by humans for use in laboratories and industry (such as chemical plants).

This concept of a membrane has been known since the eighteenth century but was used little outside of the laboratory until the end of World War II. Drinking water supplies in Europe had been compromised by The War and membrane filters were used to test for water safety. However, due to the lack of reliability, slow operation, reduced selectivity and elevated costs, membranes were not widely exploited. The first use of membranes on a large scale was with microfiltration and ultrafiltration technologies. Since the 1980s, these separation processes, along with electrodialysis, are employed in large plants and, today, several experienced companies serve the market.

The degree of selectivity of a membrane depends on the membrane pore size. Depending on the pore size, they can be classified as microfiltration (MF), ultrafiltration (UF), nanofiltration (NF) and reverse osmosis (RO) membranes. Membranes can also be of various thickness, with homogeneous or heterogeneous structure. Membranes can be neutral or charged, and particle transport can be active or passive. The latter can be facilitated by pressure, concentration, chemical or electrical gradients of the membrane process.

== Membrane processes classifications ==
=== Microfiltration (MF) ===
Microfiltration removes particles higher than 0.08–2 μm and operates within a range of 7–100 kPa. Microfiltration is used to remove residual suspended solids (SS), to remove bacteria in order to condition the water for effective disinfection and as a pre-treatment step for reverse osmosis.

Relatively recent developments are membrane bioreactors (MBR) which combine microfiltration and a bioreactor for biological treatment.

=== Ultrafiltration (UF) ===
Ultrafiltration removes particles higher than 0.005–2 μm and operates within a range of 70–700 kPa. Ultrafiltration is used for many of the same applications as microfiltration. Some ultrafiltration membranes have also been used to remove dissolved compounds with high molecular weight, such as proteins and carbohydrates. Also, they can remove viruses and some endotoxins.

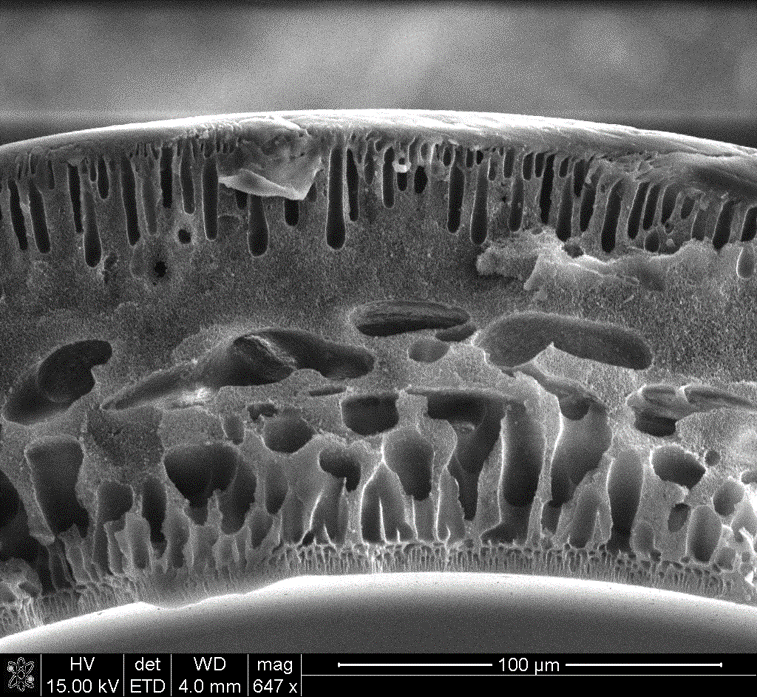
The wall of an ultrafiltration hollow fiber membrane, with characteristic outer (top) and inner (bottom) layers of pores

=== Nanofiltration (NF) ===
Nanofiltration is also known as "loose" RO and can reject particles smaller than 0.002 μm. Nanofiltration is used for the removal of selected dissolved constituents from wastewater. NF is primarily developed as a membrane softening process which offers an alternative to chemical softening.

Likewise, nanofiltration can be used as a pre-treatment before directed reverse osmosis. The main objectives of NF pre-treatment are: (1). minimize particulate and microbial fouling of the RO membranes by removal of turbidity and bacteria, (2) prevent scaling by removal of the hardness ions, (3) lower the operating pressure of the RO process by reducing the feed-water total dissolved solids (TDS) concentration.

=== Reverse osmosis (RO) ===
Reverse osmosis is commonly used for desalination. As well, RO is commonly used for the removal of dissolved constituents from wastewater remaining after advanced treatment with microfiltration. RO excludes ions but requires high pressures to produce deionized water (850–7000 kPa). RO is the most widely used desalination technology because of its simplicity of use and relatively low energy costs compared with distillation, which uses technology based on thermal processes. Note that RO membranes remove water constituents at the ionic level. To do so, most current RO systems use a thin-film composite (TFC), mainly consisting of three layers: a polyamide layer, a polysulphone layer and a polyester layer.

=== Nanostructured membranes ===
An emerging class of membranes rely on nanostructure channels to separate materials at the molecular scale. These include carbon nanotube membranes, graphene membranes, membranes made from polymers of intrinsic microporosity (PIMS), and membranes incorporating metal–organic frameworks (MOFs). These membranes can be used for size selective separations such as nanofiltration and reverse osmosis, but also adsorption selective separations such as olefins from paraffins and alcohols from water that traditionally have required expensive and energy intensive distillation.

== Membrane configurations ==
In the membrane field, the term module is used to describe a complete unit composed of the membranes, the pressure support structure, the feed inlet, the outlet permeate and retentate streams, and an overall support structure. The principal types of membrane modules are:

- Tubular, where membranes are placed inside a support porous tubes, and these tubes are placed together in a cylindrical shell to form the unit module. Tubular devices are primarily used in micro- and ultrafiltration applications because of their ability to handle process streams with high solids and high viscosity properties, as well as for their relative ease of cleaning.

- Hollow fiber membrane, consists of a bundle of hundreds to thousands of hollow fibers. The entire assembly is inserted into a pressure vessel. The feed can be applied to the inside of the fiber (inside-out flow) or the outside of the fiber (outside-in flow).

- Spiral wound, where a flexible permeate spacer is placed between two flat membranes sheet. A flexible feed spacer is added and the flat sheets are rolled into a circular configuration. In recent developments, surface patterning techniques have allowed for the integration of permeable feed spacers directly into the membrane, giving rise to the concept of an integrated membrane

- Plate and frame consist of a series of flat membrane sheets and support plates. The water to be treated passes between the membranes of two adjacent membrane assemblies. The plate supports the membranes and provides a channel for the permeate to flow out of the unit module.

- Ceramic and polymeric flat sheet membranes and modules. Flat sheet membranes are typically built-into submerged vacuum-driven filtration systems which consist of stacks of modules each with several sheets. Filtration mode is outside-in where the water passes through the membrane and is collected in permeate channels. Cleaning can be performed by aeration, backwash and CIP.

== Membrane process operation ==
The key elements of any membrane process relate to the influence of the following parameters on the overall permeate flux are:

- The membrane permeability (k)
- The operational driving force per unit membrane area (Trans Membrane Pressure, TMP)
- The fouling and subsequent cleaning of the membrane surface.

=== Flux, pressure, permeability ===
The total permeate flow from a membrane system is given by following equation:

$$Q_p=F_w \cdot A$$

Where Qp is the permeate stream flowrate [kg·s^{−1}], F_{w} is the water flux rate [kg·m^{−2}·s^{−1}] and A is the membrane area [m^{2}]

The permeability (k) [m·s^{−2}·bar^{−1}] of a membrane is given by the next equation:

$$k={F_w \over P_{TMP}}$$

The trans-membrane pressure (TMP) is given by the following expression:

$$P_{TMP}={(P_f+ P_c)\over 2}-P_p$$

where P_{TMP} is the trans-membrane pressure [kPa], P_{f} the inlet pressure of feed stream [kPa]; P_{c} the pressure of concentrate stream [kPa]; P_{p} the pressure if permeate stream [kPa].

The rejection (r) could be defined as the number of particles that have been removed from the feedwater.

$$r={(C_f-C_p)\over C_f} \cdot 100$$

The corresponding mass balance equations are:

$$Q_f=Q_p+Q_c$$

$$Q_f \cdot C_f=Q_p \cdot C_p + Q_c \cdot C_c$$

To control the operation of a membrane process, two modes, concerning the flux and the TMP, can be used. These modes are (1) constant TMP, and (2) constant flux.

The operation modes will be affected when the rejected materials and particles in the retentate tend to accumulate in the membrane. At a given TMP, the flux of water through the membrane will decrease and at a given flux, the TMP will increase, reducing the permeability (k). This phenomenon is known as fouling, and it is the main limitation to membrane process operation.

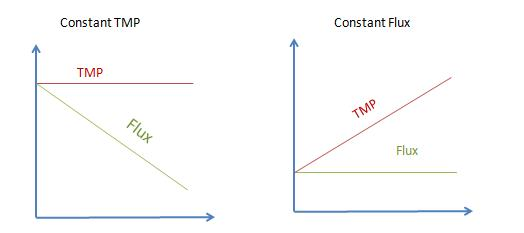

=== Dead-end and cross-flow operation modes ===
Two operation modes for membranes can be used. These modes are:

- Dead-end filtration where all the feed applied to the membrane passes through it, obtaining a permeate. Since there is no concentrate stream, all the particles are retained in the membrane. Raw feed-water is sometimes used to flush the accumulated material from the membrane surface.
- Cross-flow filtration where the feed water is pumped with a cross-flow tangential to the membrane and concentrate and permeate streams are obtained. This model implies that for a flow of feed-water across the membrane, only a fraction is converted to permeate product. This parameter is termed "conversion" or "recovery" (S). The recovery will be reduced if the permeate is further used for maintaining processes operation, usually for membrane cleaning.

$$S={Q_{permeate}\over Q_{feed}} = 1-{Q_{concentrate}\over Q_{feed}}$$

Filtration leads to an increase in the resistance against the flow. In the case of the dead-end filtration process, the resistance increases according to the thickness of the cake formed on the membrane. As a consequence, the permeability (k) and the flux rapidly decrease, proportionally to the solids concentration and, thus, requiring periodic cleaning.

For cross-flow processes, the deposition of material will continue until the forces of the binding cake to the membrane will be balanced by the forces of the fluid. At this point, cross-flow filtration will reach a steady-state condition , and thus, the flux will remain constant with time. Therefore, this configuration will demand less periodic cleaning.

== Fouling ==
Fouling can be defined as the potential deposition and accumulation of constituents in the feed stream on the membrane. The loss of RO performance can result from irreversible organic and/or inorganic fouling and chemical degradation of the active membrane layer. Microbiological fouling, generally defined as the consequence of irreversible attachment and growth of bacterial cells on the membrane, is also a common reason for discarding old membranes. A variety of oxidative solutions, cleaning and anti-fouling agents is widely used in desalination plants, and their repetitive and incidental exposure can adversely affect the membranes, generally through the decrease of their rejection efficiencies.

Fouling can take place through several physicochemical and biological mechanisms which are related to the increased deposition of solid material onto the membrane surface. The main mechanisms by which fouling can occur, are:

- Build-up of constituents of the feedwater on the membrane which causes a resistance to flow. This build-up can be divided into different types:

Pore narrowing, which consists of solid material that it has been attached to the interior surface of the pores.
Pore blocking occurs when the particles of the feed-water become stuck in the pores of the membrane.
Gel/cake layer formation takes places when the solid matter in the feed is larger than the pore sizes of the membrane.

- Formation of chemical precipitates known as scaling
- Colonization of the membrane or biofouling takes place when microorganisms grow on the membrane surface.

=== Fouling control and mitigation ===
Since fouling is an important consideration in the design and operation of membrane systems, as it affects pre-treatment needs, cleaning requirements, operating conditions, cost and performance, it should be prevented, and if necessary, removed. Optimizing the operation conditions is important to prevent fouling. However, if fouling has already taken place, it should be removed by using physical or chemical cleaning.

Physical cleaning techniques for membrane include membrane relaxation and membrane backwashing.

- Back-washing or back-flushing consists of pumping the permeate in the reverse direction through the membrane. Back-washing removes successfully most of the reversible fouling caused by pore blocking. Backwashing can also be enhanced by flushing air through the membrane. Backwashing increase the operating costs since energy is required to achieve a pressure suitable for permeate flow reversion.

- Membrane relaxation consists of pausing the filtration during a period, and thus, there is no need for permeate flow reversion. Relaxation allows filtration to be maintained for a longer period before the chemical cleaning of the membrane.

- Back pulsing high frequency back pulsing resulting in efficient removal of dirt layer. This method is most commonly used for ceramic membranes

Recent studies have assessed to combine relaxation and backwashing for optimum results.

Chemical cleaning. Relaxation and backwashing effectiveness will decrease with operation time as more irreversible fouling accumulates on the membrane surface. Therefore, besides the physical cleaning, chemical cleaning may also be recommended. It includes:

- Chemical enhanced backwash, that is, a low concentration of chemical cleaning agent is added during the backwashing period.
- Chemical cleaning, where the main cleaning agents are sodium hypochlorite (for organic fouling) and citric acid (for inorganic fouling). Every membrane supplier proposes their chemical cleaning recipes, which differ mainly in terms of concentration and methods.

Optimizing the operation condition. Several mechanisms can be carried out to optimize the operating conditions of the membrane to prevent fouling, for instance:

- Reducing flux. The flux always reduces fouling but it impacts on capital cost since it demands more membrane area. It consists of working at sustainable flux which can be defined as the flux for which the TMP increases gradually at an acceptable rate, such that chemical cleaning is not necessary.
- Using cross-flow filtration instead of dead-end. In cross-flow filtration, only a thin layer is deposited on the membrane since not all the particles are retained on the membrane, but the concentrate removes them.
- Pre-treatment of the feed water is used to reduce the suspended solids and bacterial content of the feed-water. Flocculants and coagulants are also used, like ferric chloride and aluminium sulphate that, once dissolved in the water, adsorbs materials such as suspended solids, colloids and soluble organic. Metaphysical numerical models have been introduced in order to optimize transport phenomena.

Membrane alteration. Recent efforts have focused on eliminating membrane fouling by altering the surface chemistry of the membrane material to reduce the likelihood that foulants will adhere to the membrane surface. The exact chemical strategy used is dependent on the chemistry of the solution that is being filtered. For example, membranes used in desalination might be made hydrophobic to resist fouling via accumulation of minerals, while membranes used for biologics might be made hydrophilic to reduce protein/organic accumulation. Modification of surface chemistry via thin film deposition can thereby largely reduce fouling. One drawback to using modification techniques is that, in some cases, the flux rate and selectivity of the membrane process can be negatively impacted.

== Recycling of RO membranes ==
=== Waste prevention ===
Once the membrane reaches a significant performance decline it is discarded. Discarded RO membrane modules are currently classified worldwide as inert solid waste and are often disposed of in landfills; although they can also be energetically recovered. However, various efforts have been made over the past decades to avoid this, such as waste prevention, direct reapplication, and ways of recycling. In this regard, membranes also follows the waste management hierarchy. This means that the most preferable action is to upgrade the design of the membrane which leads to a reduction in use at same application and the least preferred action is a disposal and landfilling.

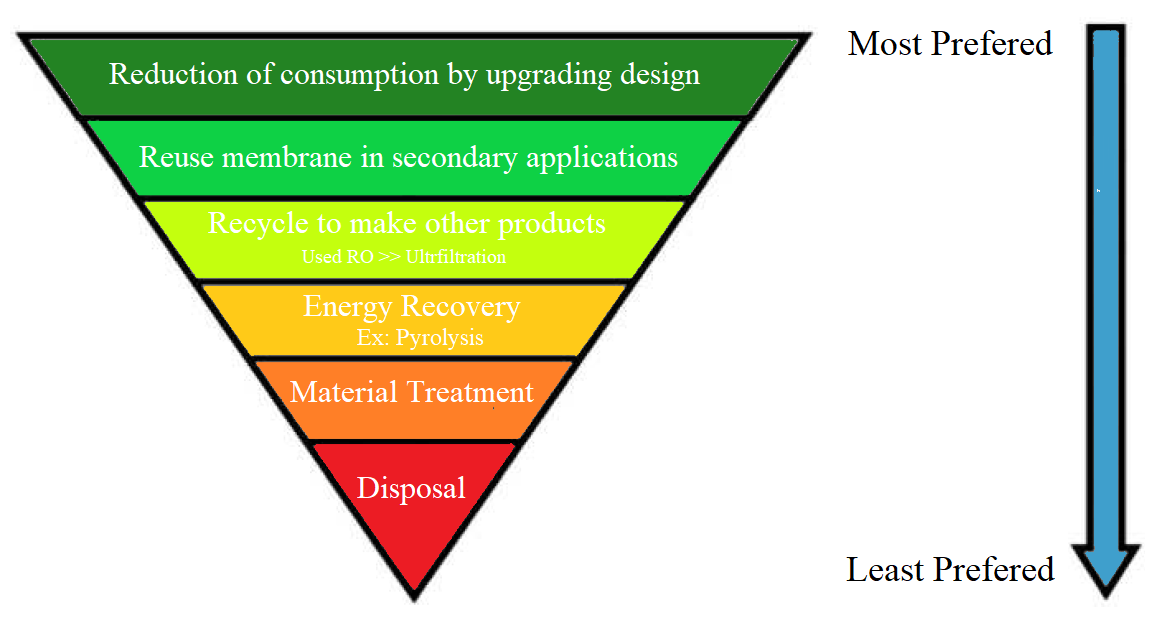

RO membranes have some environmental challenges that must be resolved in order to comply with the circular economy principles. Mainly they have a short service life of 5–10 years. Over the past two decades, the number of RO desalination plants has increased by 70%. The size of these RO plants has also increased significantly, with some reaching a production capacity exceeding 600,000 m^{3} of water per day. This means a generation of 14,000 tonnes of membrane waste that is landfilled every year. To increment the lifespan of a membrane, different prevention methods are developed: combining the RO process with the pre-treatment process to improve efficiency; developing anti-fouling techniques; and developing suitable procedures for cleaning the membranes. Pre-treatment processes lower the operating costs because of lesser amounts of chemical additives in the saltwater feed and the lower operational maintenance required for the RO system.

Four types of fouling are found on RO membranes: (i) Inorganic (salt precipitation), (ii) Organic, (iii) Colloidal (particle deposition in the suspension) (iv) Microbiological (bacteria and fungi). Thereby, an appropriate combination of pre-treatment procedures and chemical dosing, as well as an efficient cleaning plan that tackle these types of fouling, should enable the development of an effective anti-fouling technique.

Most plants clean their membranes every week (CEB – Chemically Enhanced Backwash). In addition to this maintenance cleaning, an intensive cleaning (CIP) is recommended, from two to four times annually.

=== Reuse ===
Reuse of RO membranes include the direct reapplication of modules in other separation processes with less stringent specifications. The conversion from the RO TFC membrane to a porous membrane is possible by degrading the dense layer of polyamide. Converting RO membranes by chemical treatment with different oxidizing solutions are aimed at removing the active layer of the polyamide membrane, intended for reuse in applications such as MF or UF. This causes an extended life of approximately two years. A very limited number of reports have mentioned the potential of direct RO reuse. Studies shows that hydraulic permeability, salt rejection, morphological and topographical characteristics, and field emission scanning electron and atomic force microscopy were used in an autopsy investigation conducted. The old RO element's performance resembled that of nanofiltration (NF) membranes, thus it was not surprising to see the permeability increase from 1.0 to 2.1 L m^{−2}h^{−1}bar^{−1} and the drop in NaCl rejection from >90% to 35–50%.

On the other hand, In order to maximize the overall efficiency of the process, it has lately been common practice to combine RO elements of varying performances within the same pressure vessel, which is called Multi-membrane vessel design. In principle, this innovative hybrid system recommends using high rejection, low productivity membranes in the upstream segment of the filtration train, followed by high productivity, low energy membranes in the downstream section. There are two ways in which this design can help: either by decreasing energy use due to decreased pressure needs or by increasing output. Since this concept would reduce the number of modules and pressure vessels needed for a given application, it has the potential to significantly reduce initial investment costs. It is proposed to adapt this original concept, by internally reusing older RO membranes within the same pressure vessel.

=== Recycle ===
Recycling of materials is a general term that involves physically transforming the material or its components so that they can be regenerated into other useful products. The membrane modules are complex structures, consisting of a number of different polymeric components and, potentially, the individual components can be recovered for other purposes. Plastic solid waste treatment and recycling can be separated into mechanical recycling, chemical recycling and energy recovery.

=== Techniques recycling ===
Mechanical recycling characteristics:

- A first separation of the components of interest is needed.
- Previous washing to avoid property deterioration during the process.
- Grinding of the polymeric materials into suitable size (loss of 5% of the material).
- Possible posterior washing.
- Melting and extrusion process (loss of 10 % of material).
- Membrane components than can be recycled (thermoplastics): PP, polyester, etc.
- Membrane sheets: constructed from a number of different polymers and additives and therefore inherently difficult to accurately and efficiently separate.
- Main advantage: it displaces virgin plastic production. • Main disadvantages: need to separate all components, large-enough amount of components to be viable.

Chemical recycling characteristics:

- Break down the polymers into smaller molecules, using depolymerisation and degradation techniques.
- Cannot be used with contaminated materials.
- Chemical recycling processes are tailored for specific materials.
- Advantage: that heterogeneous polymers with limited use of pre-treatment can be processed.
- Disadvantage: more expensive and complex than mechanical recycling.
- Polyester materials (such as in the permeate spacer and components of the membrane sheet) are suitable for chemical recycling processes, and hydrolysis is used to reverse the poly-condensation reaction used to make the polymer, with the addition of water to cause decomposition.

Energetic recovery characteristics:

- Volume reduction by 90–99%, reducing the strain on landfill.
- Waste incinerators can generally operate from 760 °C to 1100 °C and would therefore be capable of removing all combustible material, with the exception of the residual inorganic filler in the fiberglass casing.
- Heat energy can be recovered and used for electricity generation or other heat related processes, and can also offset the greenhouse gas emissions from traditional energy.
- If not properly controlled, can emit greenhouse gases as well as other harmful products.

Post-treatment

- After applying the chosen technique, it is necessary to carry out a post-treatment process to ensure that the membrane can function normally again.
- The first step in post-treatment involves removing all residual waste from the equipment. This ensures that no contaminants remain that could affect the membrane's performance.
- Separation techniques are employed to recover valuable materials from reverse osmosis membranes, such as polyamide or polysulfone, which can be recycled and reused in the production of new membranes or other products. During the material recovery stage, physical or chemical separation processes are conducted to isolate and purify these materials, ensuring their quality and facilitating their reintroduction into the production chain.
- Following waste removal, the membrane is tested in a pilot system. During this phase, its performance is carefully analyzed to determine if the output meets the defined parameters and limits. This step is crucial to verify that the membrane operates efficiently and effectively after treatment.

=== Advantages of RO membranes recycling ===
- Implementing a recycling process for RO membranes can incur additional costs, which many companies or organizations may be hesitant to accept. Moreover, recycled membranes often exhibit lower performance and efficiency. However, one significant advantage of recycling is the reduction of the environmental impact associated with producing new membranes from raw materials. RO membranes contain polymers derived from petroleum, a major source of greenhouse gases (GHGs) that contribute to climate change. Additionally, these polymers are not biodegradable, making them challenging to recycle.
- By recycling RO membranes, we reduce the need for new materials, thereby lessening the environmental footprint. Producing new membranes from petroleum-derived polymers increases GHG emissions. Recycling existing membranes helps mitigate this impact by reusing materials that would otherwise contribute to environmental degradation.
- The demand for RO membranes has surged due to stricter regulations on wastewater discharge. This demand could potentially surpass supply, making the recycling of current RO membranes a viable solution to address this challenge.
- The increasing demand for RO membranes has led to higher prices. In contrast, the recycling process is generally more cost-effective than purchasing new membranes. This cost advantage can help offset the initial investment required for setting up recycling operations.

== Applications ==
Distinct features of membranes are responsible for the interest in using them as additional unit operation for separation processes in fluid processes. Some advantages noted include:

- Less energy-intensive, since they do not require major phase changes
- Do not demand adsorbents or solvents, which may be expensive or difficult to handle
- Equipment simplicity and modularity, which facilitates the incorporation of more efficient membranes

Membranes are used with pressure as the driving processes in membrane filtration of solutes and in reverse osmosis. In dialysis and pervaporation the chemical potential along a concentration gradient is the driving force. Also perstraction as a membrane assisted extraction process relies on the gradient in chemical potential. A submerged flexible mound breakwater as a type of using membrane can be employed for wave control in shallow water as an advanced alternative to the conventional rigid submerged designs.

However, their overwhelming success in biological systems is not matched by their application. The main reasons for this are:

- Fouling – the decrease of function with use
- Prohibitive cost per membrane area
- Lack of solvent resistant materials
- Scale-up risks

== See also ==
- Collodion bag
- Interface (matter)

== Bibliography ==
- Metcalf and Eddy. Wastewater Engineering, Treatment and Reuse. McGraw-Hill Book Company, New York. Fourth Edition, 2004.
- Paula van den Brink, Frank Vergeldt, Henk Van As, Arie Zwijnenburg, Hardy Temmink, Mark C.M.van Loosdrecht. "Potential of mechanical cleaning of membranes from a membrane bioreactor". Journal of membrane science. 429, 2013. 259–267.
- Simon Judd. The Membrane Bioreactor Book: Principles and Applications of Membrane Bioreactors for Water and Wastewater Treatment. Elsevier, 2010.
