= Spinneret (polymers) =

Any structure natural or artificial used to extrude polymers into fibers

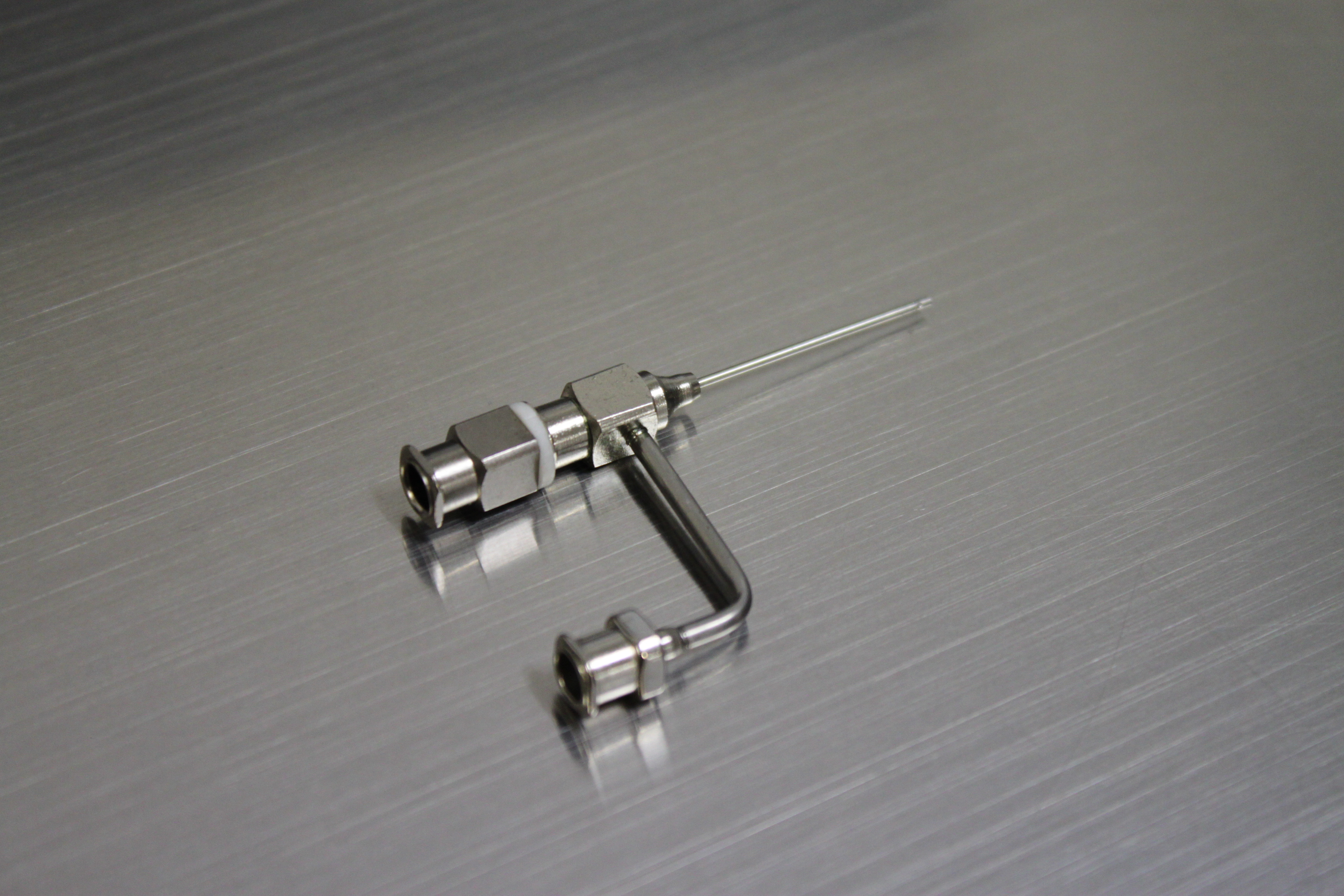
A stainless steel coaxial spinneret manufactured by the ramé–hart instrument co., Succasunna, New Jersey

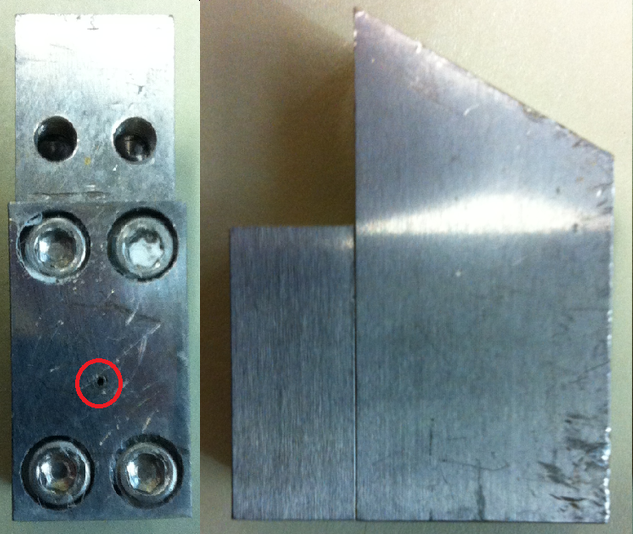
A hollow fiber membrane spinneret, with polymer outlet outlined in red.

A spinneret is a device used to extrude a polymer solution or polymer melt to form fibers. Streams of viscous polymer exit via the spinneret into air or liquid leading to a phase inversion which allows the polymer to solidify. The individual polymer chains tend to align in the fiber because of viscous flow. This airstream liquid-to-fiber formation process is similar to the production process for cotton candy. The fiber production process is generally referred to as "spinning". Depending on the type of spinneret used, either solid or hollow fibers can be formed. Spinnerets are also used for electrospinning and electrospraying applications. They are sometimes called coaxial needles, or coaxial emitters.

Spinnerets are usually made of metals with melting points too low to withstand the heating processes employed in industrial metallurgy, and thus are generally not used to form metallic fibers.

== See also ==
- Electrospinning
- Hollow fiber membrane
- Spinning (polymers)
- Textiles
- Thermal cleaning
- Spinneret
