= Anaerobic membrane bioreactor =

Anaerobic membrane bioreactor or AnMBR is the name of a technology utilized in wastewater treatment. It is a technology in membrane filtration for biomass retention. AnMBR works by using a membrane bioreactor (MBR) in a anaerobic environment. Anaerobic bacteria ( Mesophile or Thermophile) and archaea convert organic materials into carbon dioxide (CO_{2}) and methane (CH_{4}). The sewage is filtered and separated by membranes leaving the effluent and sludge apart. The produced biogas can later be combusted to generate heat or electricity. It can also be upgraded (purified) into Renewable natural gas of household quality. AnMBR is considered to be a sustainable alternative for sewage treatment because the energy that can be generated by methane combustion can exceed the energy required for maintaining the process.

== Process ==
The AnMBR technology goes through two stages to ensure maximum solid-liquid separation, adhering to increasing standards for effluent. First, the wastewater enters the anaerobic bioreactor unit, where the organic load goes through the anaerobic process to be transformed into biogas. Subsequently, the remaining liquid, which still has small amounts of solids, goes into the membrane unit, to separate the remaining, smaller solid particles from the anaerobically treated wastewater. This wastewater, otherwise known as effluent, can now either directly be recycled, or can further be treated by Reverse osmosis. The remaining solid particles are then cycled back to the anaerobic bioreactor unit where they can go through the biogas production process. Overall, this process removes 99% of the organic load contained within wastewater, and also produces biogas with a 70% purity.

=== Anaerobic process ===
The anaerobic aspect of this process, the process carried out without oxygen, is performed by anaerobic microorganisms degrading organic substances in the wastewater. An integral process within this part of the separation is hydrolysis, which decomposes the organic compounds into much simpler compounds which can then be passed through microbial cells. This is the first of a four-step process to complete the transformation of organic matter to biogases:

1. Hydrolysis: Specifically, enzymatic hydrolysis is used to release proteins from the microorganisms. These processes subsequently break down complex compounds, such as lipids, proteins, and polysaccharides, which have a large molecular mass, to simple compounds such as:
  - Lipids → fatty acids and glycerol
  - Proteins → amino acids
  - Polysaccharides → glucose, fructose, and galactose
2. Acidogenesis: Takes the products of hydrolysis, mentioned above, and utilizes acidogenic bacteria to transform them into:
  - Short-chain fatty acids: lactic acid, propionic acid, and butyric acids
  - Ethanol
  - Hydrogen gas
  - Carbon dioxide
3. Acetogenesis: Anaerobic bacteria are used to convert the products of acidogenesis to:
  - Acetic acid
  - Hydrogen gas
  - Carbon dioxide
  - Small organic molecules
4. Methanogenesis: In the final step, methanogenic bacteria transform the aforementioned intermediate products into biogas(methane and carbon dioxide).

This process has to be carried out under a specific range of temperatures and pH. Most of the time, an anaerobic process will be slowed down if the temperature of the process goes below 35 °C (mesophilic and thermophilic conditions). Since a distinguishing characteristic of anaerobic processes is their slow development, many other factors can further slow down this process such as the organic matter composition, nutrient concentration, and the presence of toxic substances. All of these factors can fully veer the treatment off its course if not analyzed properly.

=== Membrane Process ===
The membrane process utilizes biofilm, a naturally occurring substance found in lakes, rivers, rocks, and other natural formations. They are utilized by causing the necessary biomass/organic matter to attach to the desired area. The solid particles are too big to permeate the membrane, so only pure liquid is able to get through. This allows for a high retention rate, therefore allowing the wastewater to be reusable.

== Variants of the AnMBR ==
The first known variant of the AnMBR was developed by Dorr-Oliver in 1980, specifically to treat wastewater with high organic loads, specifically, dairy wastewater. Due to the high cost of membranes, the technology was never applied on a larger commercial scale, only going through laboratory and pilot scale trials.

There are three main configurations of the AnMBR, each with a different location of the membrane unit. The variants all have their own advantages and disadvantages both in terms of cost and operability.

=== Crossflow/ External AnMBR ===
This variant keeps the membrane unit outside of the main reactor unit, hence its name. In this configuration, the wastewater goes through the anaerobic process. After this step is complete, the remaining mixed liquor, put under a high amount of pressure, flows into the external membrane unit. Keeping the same pressure, crossflow filtration is utilized to separate the permeate and retentate, effluent and organic load respectively. Ultimately, the two end up settling on opposite sides of the membrane filtration system. From here, the effluent is released and the organic load cycles back to the main reactor unit where it can go through the anaerobic process to create more biogas.

=== Submerged AnMBR ===
This variant integrates the membrane unit directly into the bioreactor unit. This configuration varies from the other two in the fact that the raw influent enters the membrane unit instead of first going through the anaerobic process. In the membrane unit, a low negative pressure separates the retentate and permeate. The permeate, otherwise known as the effluent, leaves the system while the retentate goes through the anaerobic process to become biogas.

=== Externally Submerged AnMBR ===
This variant of the AnMBR combines the previous two variants, keeping the membrane unit external, but submerged within an external chamber. The anaerobic process takes place first, and then subsequently enters the membrane unit for filtration. Here, the influent(wastewater) is pumped into the externally submerged chamber where it is then filtered into the permeate(effluent) and the retentate(organic load). This variant, similar to the submerged AnMBR, also utilizes low negative pressure to separate the permeate and retentate. Following this process, the effluent leaves the system while the organic load recirculates into the bioreactor unit to then turn into biogas.

=== Advantages and Disadvantages of Each Variant ===
Between the three variants of the AnMBR, there are many factors that weigh into their industrial use.

Cost: The submerged AnMBR variant is the most cost-effective due to the low negative pressure requirements. In addition, the liquid does not need to be pumped into an external chamber to go through the filtration process. Due to both of these characteristics of the submerged AnMBR, it has a lower energy requirement, therefore costing less to operate than the external AnMBR variants.

Operability: The external AnMBR/ external submerged AnMBR variants are the most advantageous in terms of operability. In these variants, less membrane fouling occurs, and therefore these variants are functional for long periods of time. Additionally, due to the two units being separated, they are much simpler to clean when compared with the submerged AnMBR.

Size: While one of the main overall advantages of the AnMBR is its relatively compact size, the submerged AnMBR variant is the most compact of the three, keeping all of its operations within a single unit.

Despite the disadvantages that the submerged AnMBR harbors in terms of operability, its cost and size are both desirable traits to companies, subsequently making it the frequented variant in the industry.

== Environmental Impacts ==
This technology can be used to diminish the effect of droughts by effectively treating the wastewater in such a way that it can be reused, specifically for agricultural purposes.

In addition, the AnMBR properly treats the organic load in wastewater such that it is not being released into the environment. The technology also produces less sludge due to the conversion into biogas, which provides more of an opportunity for recycling.

When compared to its counterparts, the traditional Membrane Bioreactor and the Aerobic Membrane Bioreactor, the AnMBR comes up ahead due to the higher quality of effluent that it discharges as well as the lesser amount of sludge, due to biogas production.

== Shortcomings ==
While the AnMBR technology has many benefits for revolutionizing wastewater treatment, it does not come without its drawbacks. The AnMBR is prone to membrane fouling by aggregation of bacteria. This proves to be quite dangerous for the technology as it would drastically reduce the efficiency of filtration, in turn also increasing energy consumption, making the entire process more expensive. Membrane fouling also leads to the technology having to be replaced much more often, which is also expensive. In addition, the anaerobic bacteria are susceptible to entering the effluent, which leads to their loss in the reactor unit.

== Industrial Applications ==
While the AnMBR has not been applied at an industrial scale yet, there are a few companies that produce the technology and are marketing it as a viable alternative to current wastewater treatment technologies. Two prominent companies who are marketing the AnMBR system are Aquatech and Evoqua. Currently, Aquatech produces the external AnMBR configuration while Evoqua produces the submerged AnMBR configuration.
