= Hollow fiber membrane =

Class of artificial membranes containing a semi-permeable hollow fiber barrier

Hollow fiber membranes (HFMs) are a class of artificial membranes containing a semi-permeable barrier in the form of a hollow fiber. Originally developed in the 1960s for reverse osmosis applications, hollow fiber membranes have since become prevalent in water treatment, desalination, cell culture, medicine, and tissue engineering. Most commercial hollow fiber membranes are packed into cartridges which can be used for a variety of liquid and gaseous separations.

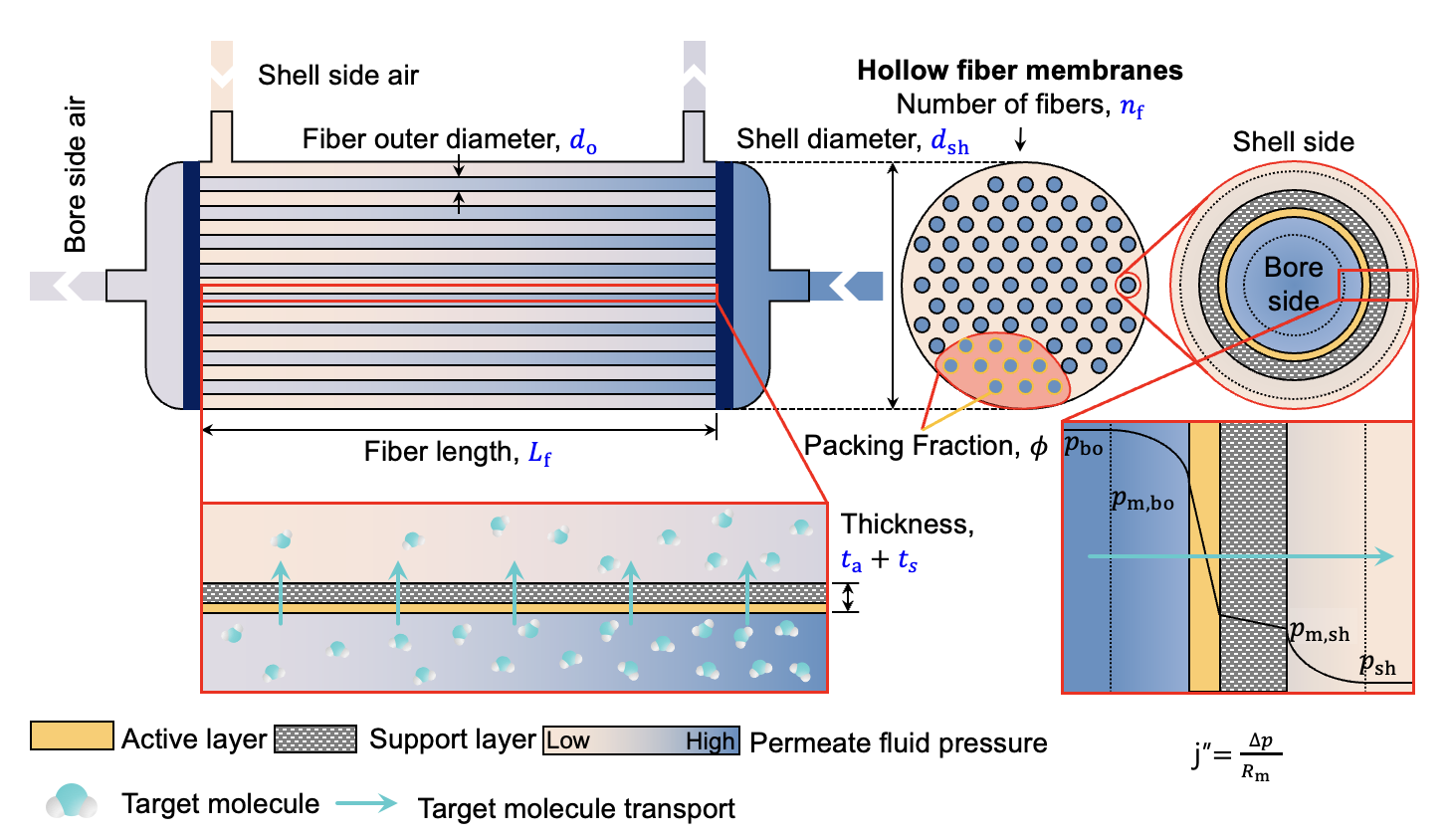
Schematic diagram of a hollow fiber membrane module, including call outs for a cross section (top right), membrane transport (bottom left) and partial pressure of the solute. Modified by authors from

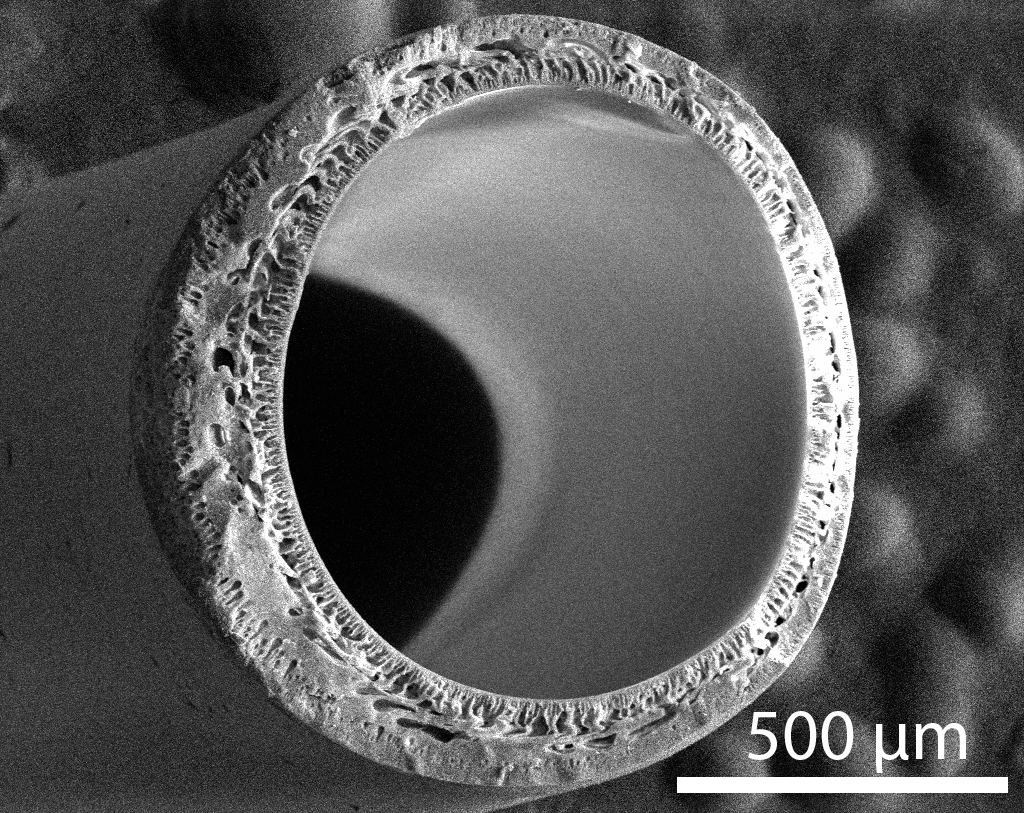
SEM cross-section of a polysulfone hollow fiber membrane fabricated by nonsolvent-induced phase separation.

Extrusion of nascent hollow fiber membrane polymer solution through the annulus of a spinneret.

An example dry-jet wet spinning hollow fiber fabrication system in operation.

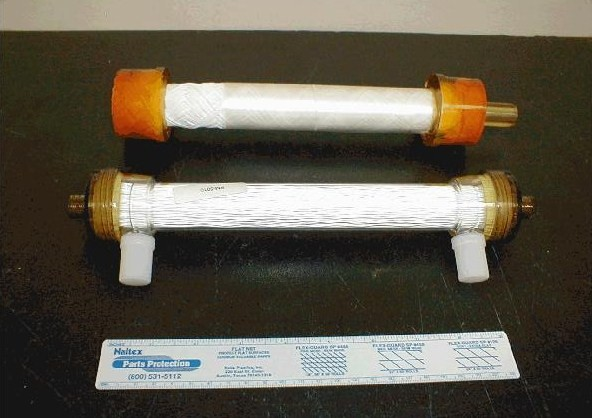
An example of a hollow fiber membrane cartridge.

== Manufacturing ==
HFMs are commonly produced using artificial polymers. The specific production methods involved are heavily dependent on the type of polymer used as well as its molecular weight. HFM production, commonly referred to as "spinning", can be divided into four general types:

- Melt Spinning, in which a thermoplastic polymer is melted and extruded through a spinneret into air and subsequently cooled.
- Dry Spinning, in which a polymer is dissolved in an appropriate solvent and extruded through a spinneret into air.
- Dry-Jet Wet Spinning, in which a polymer is dissolved in an appropriate solvent and extruded into air and a subsequent coagulant (usually water).
- Wet spinning, in which a polymer is dissolved and extruded directly into a coagulant (usually water).

Common to each of these methods is the use of a spinneret, a device containing a needle through which solvent is extruded and an annulus through which a polymer solution is extruded. As the polymer is extruded through the annulus of the spinneret, it retains a hollow cylindrical shape. As the polymer exits the spinneret, it solidifies into a membrane through a process known as phase inversion. The properties of the membrane -such as average pore diameter and membrane thickness- can be finely tuned by changing the dimensions of the spinneret, temperature and composition of "dope" (polymer) and "bore" (solvent) solutions, length of air gap (for dry-jet wet spinning), temperature and composition of the coagulant, as well as the speed at which produced fiber is collected by a motorized spool. Extrusion of the polymer and solvent through the spinneret can be accomplished either through the use of gas-extrusion or a metered pump. Some of the polymers most commonly used for fabricating HFMs include cellulose acetate, polysulfone, polyethersulfone, and polyvinylidene fluoride.

After fibers are created, they are typically assembled together in a membrane module, with many fibers in parallel. Fiber ends are fixed together in a resin or epoxy at both ends. This part may be cut clean through to more readily expose their entrance/exits. Typically, these are place inside a cylinder, which has inlets and outlets on opposite sides for the bore (Lumen) side, and side ports for allowing flow to go over the membranes on the shell side. Typically, the higher pressure feed is on the bore side, to avoid fiber collapse.

== Characterization ==
The properties of HFMs can be characterized using the same techniques commonly used for other types of membranes. The primary properties of interest for HFMs are average pore diameter and pore distribution, measurable via a technique known as porosimetry, a feature of several laboratory instruments used for measuring pore size. Pore diameter can also be measured via a technique known as evapoporometry, in which evaporation of 2-propanol through the pores of a membrane is related to pore size via the Kelvin equation. Depending on the diameters of pores in an HFM, scanning electron microscopy or transmission electron microscopy can be used to yield a qualitative perspective of pore size.

== Applications ==
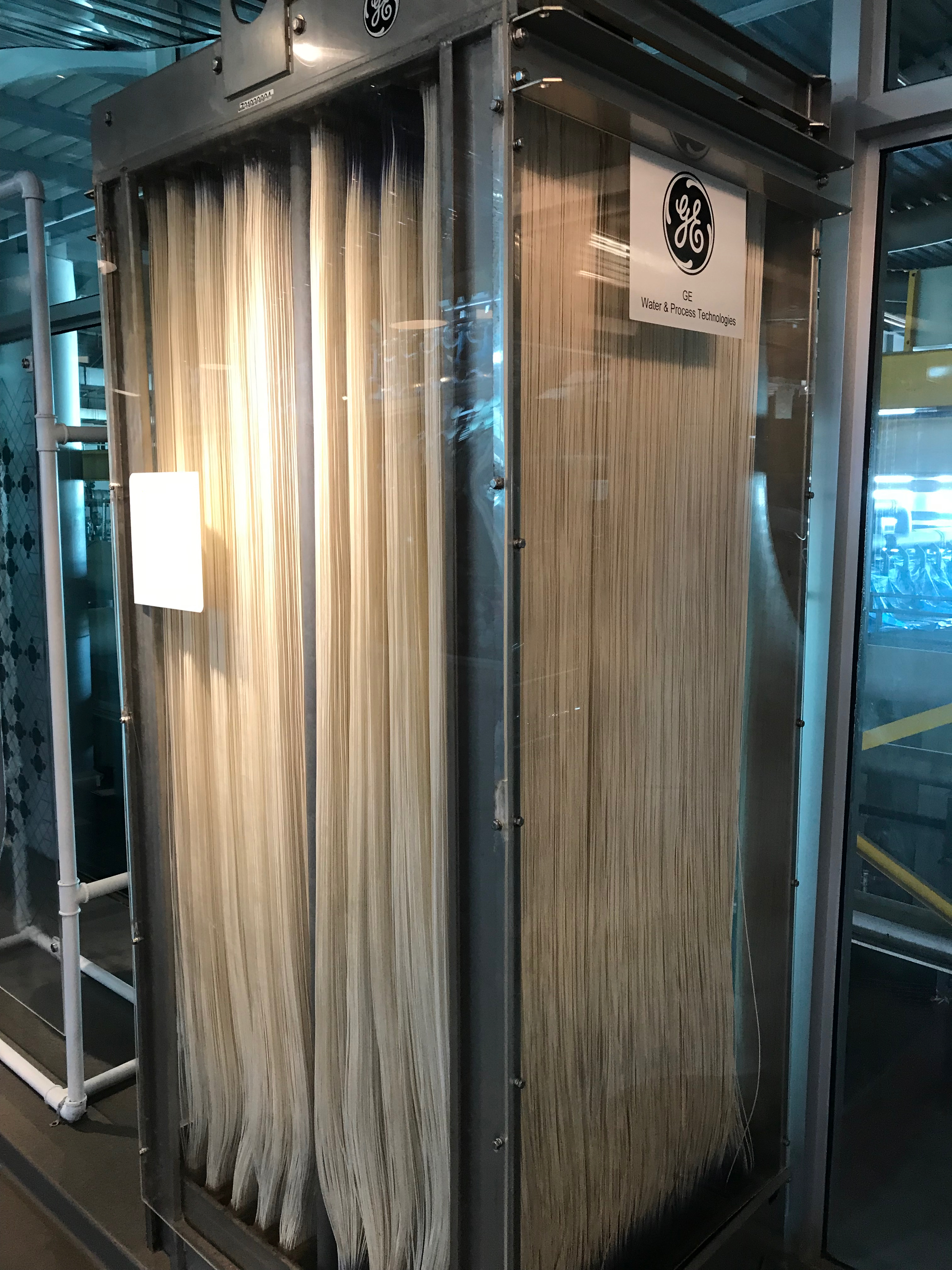
A reinforced immersed hollow fiber membrane cassette used in membrane bioreactor process for water treatment

Hollow fiber membranes are ubiquitously used in industrial separations, especially the filtration of drinking water. They are also widely used in biomedical applications, such as dialysis and extracorporeal membrane oxygenation.

Industrial water filters are mainly equipped with ultrafiltration hollow fiber membranes. Domestic water filtration systems have microfiltration hollow fiber membranes. In microfiltration a membrane pore diameter of 0.1 micrometers cuts-off microorganisms like germs and bacteria, Giardia cysts and other intestinal parasites, as well removing sediments. Ultrafiltration membranes are capable of removing not only bacteria, but also viruses.

Hollow fibers are commonly used substrates for specialized bioreactor systems, with the ability of some hollow fiber cartridges to culture billions of anchorage-dependent cells within a relatively low (<100 mL) bioreactor volume.

Hollow fibers can be used for drug efficacy testing in cancer research, as an alternative to the traditional, but more expensive, xenograft model.

Hollow fiber membranes are used in Membrane oxygenators in extracorporeal membrane oxygenation which oxygenates blood, replacing lungs in critically ill patients. They are also used in inerting systems which reduce the oxygen content within aircraft fuel tanks to prevent fuel vapor combustion. In dialysis, dialyzers with thousands of hollow fiber membranes are used to remove the uremic toxins from the bloodstream of patients with kidney failure. However, the low hemocompatibility of dialysis membranes leads to blood cell deposition and blood clot formation, which can reduce the efficiency of dialyzers. Current research aims to improve the hemocompatibility of these membranes by using new materials, or incorporating anticoagulants, such as Heparin or Danaparoid, directly into the membranes.

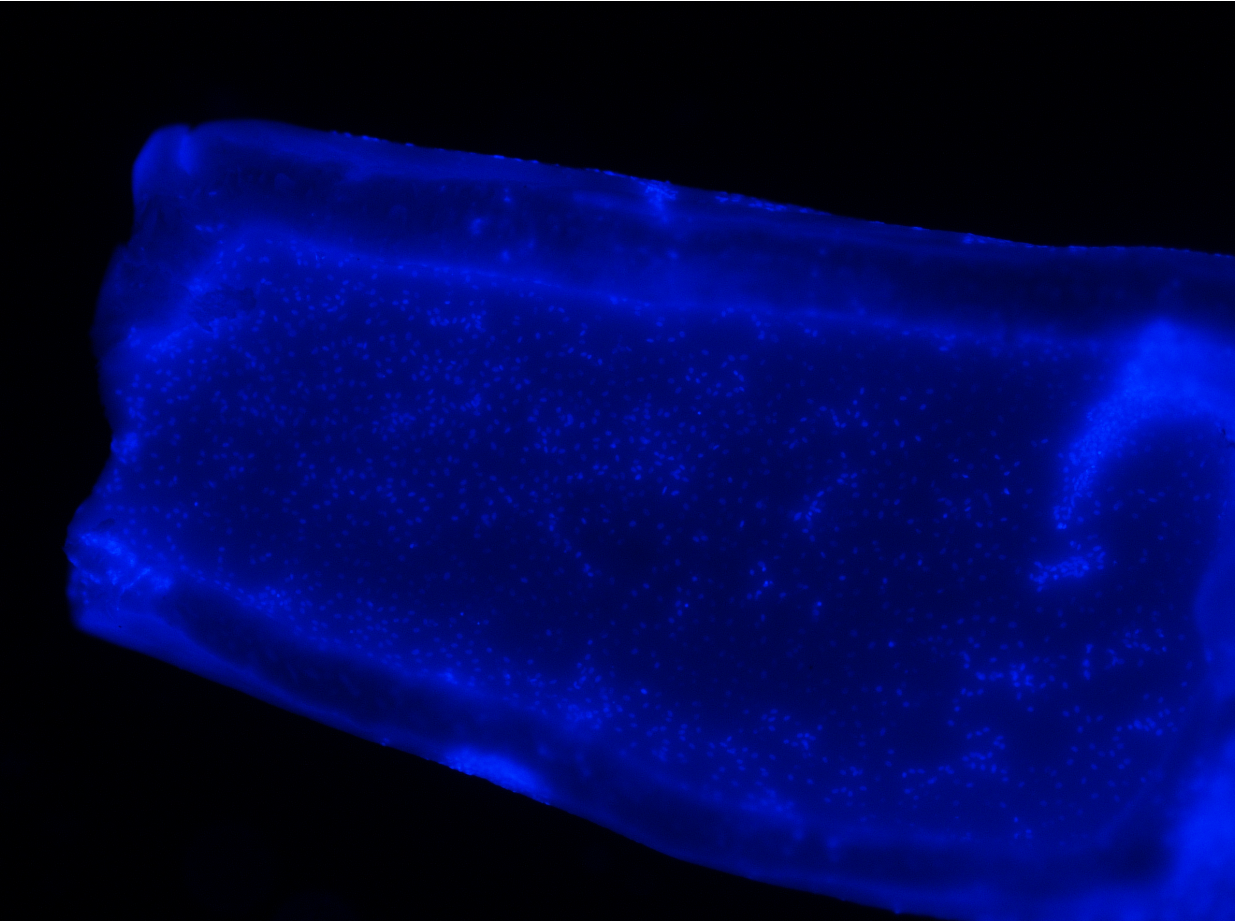
A longitudinal cross section of a polysulfone hollow fiber membrane intraluminally cultured with 3T3 fibroblasts and stained with DAPI.

== See also ==
- Membrane
- List of synthetic polymers
- Reverse osmosis
- Nanofiltration
- Ultrafiltration
- Microfiltration
