= Hollow-fiber bioreactor =

Cell-culturing system

A hollow-fiber bioreactor is a 3-dimensional cell-culturing system based on hollow fibers, which are small, semi-permeable capillary membranes arranged in a parallel array with a typical molecular weight cut-off (MWCO) range of 10–30 kDa. These hollow-fiber membranes are often bundled and housed within tubular polycarbonate shells to create hollow-fiber bioreactor cartridges. Within the cartridges, which are also fitted with inlet and outlet ports, are two compartments: the intracapillary (IC) space within the hollow fibers, and the extracapillary (EC) space surrounding the hollow fibers.

Cells are seeded into the EC space of the hollow fiber bioreactor and expand there. Cell-culture medium is pumped through the IC space and delivers oxygen and nutrients to the cells via hollow-fiber membrane perfusion. As the cells expand, their waste products and CO_{2} also perfuse the hollow fiber membranes and are carried away by the pumping of medium through the IC space. As waste products build up due to increased cell mass, the rate of medium flow can also be increased so that cell growth is not inhibited by waste-product toxicity.

Because thousands of hollow fibers may be packed into a single hollow-fiber bioreactor, they increase the surface area of the cartridge considerably. As a result, cells can fill up the EC space to densities greater than 10^{8} cells/ml. However, the cartridge itself takes up a very small volume (oftentimes the volume of a 12-ounce soda can). The fact that hollow-fiber bioreactors are very small and yet enable incredibly high cell densities has led to their development for both research and commercial applications, including monoclonal-antibody and influenza-vaccine production. Likewise, because hollow-fiber bioreactors use up significantly less medium and growth factors than traditional cell-culture methods such as stirred-tank bioreactors, they offer significant cost savings. Finally, hollow-fiber bioreactors are sold as single-use disposables, resulting in significant time savings for laboratory staff and technicians.

== History ==
In 1972, the Richard Knazek group at the NIH reported how mouse fibroblasts cultured on 1.5 cm^{3} hollow-fiber capillary membranes composed of cellulose acetate were able to form 1-millimeter-wide nodules in 28 days. The group recorded the final cell number as approximately 1.7×10^{7} cells from a starter batch of only 200000 cells. When the same group cultured human choriocarcinoma cells on polymeric and silicone polycarbonate capillary membranes totaling less than 3 cm^{3} in volume, the cells expanded to an amount approximating 2.17×10^{8} cells.

The Knazek group was awarded the patent for hollow-fiber bioreactor technology in 1974. Based on this patented technology, companies began building different and larger-scale hollow-fiber bioreactors, with significant development and technological improvement occurring in the late 1980s to early 1990s. By 1990, at least three companies were reported to offer commercially available hollow-fiber bioreactors.

One engineering advance included adding a gas-exchange cartridge, which enabled better control of system's pH and oxygen levels. Similar to a mammalian lung, the gas-exchange cartridge efficiently oxygenated the culture medium, allowing the bioreactor to support higher numbers of cells. Combined with the ability to add or remove CO_{2} for precise pH control, the limitations commonly associated with large-scale cell culture were eliminated, resulting in densely packed cell cultures that could be maintained for several months.

In addition, control of the fluid dynamics within each hollow-fiber bioreactor led to further optimization of the cell-culture environment. By alternating the pressure gradient across the hollow-fiber membrane, media could flow back and forth between the EC side (cell compartment) and the IC side (hollow-fiber lumen). This process, combined with the axial media flow created when media passes down the length of the fibers, optimized the growth environment throughout the entire bioreactor.

This concept is termed EC cycling, and was developed as a solution to the gradients that form within hollow-fiber bioreactors when media is pushed down the lengths of their fibers. Higher hydrostatic pressure at the axial end (media entering the fiber lumen) compared to the distal end of the bioreactor creates a Starling flow in the EC space, which is similar to what is observed in the body. This phenomenon also creates a nutrient-rich axial region and a nutrient-depleted distal region within the bioreactor. By incorporating EC cycling, the effects of Starling flow are eliminated, and the entire bioreactor becomes nutrient-rich and optimized for cell growth.

Optimal IC and EC space perfusion rates must be achieved to efficiently deliver media nutrients and growth supplements, respectively, and to collect supernatant. During the cell-growth phase within these bioreactors, the media feed rate is increased to accommodate the expanding cell population. More specifically, the IC media perfusion rate is increased to provide additional glucose and oxygen to the cells while continually removing metabolic wastes such as lactic acid. When the cell space is completely filled with cells, the media feed rate plateaus, resulting in constant glucose consumption, oxygen uptake, and lactate production rates.

== Applications ==
With the introduction of hybridoma technology in 1975, cell culture could be applied towards the generation of secreted proteins such as monoclonal antibodies, growth hormones, and even some categories of vaccines. In order to produce these proteins on a commercial scale, new methods for culturing large batches of cells had to be developed. One such technological development was the hollow-fiber bioreactor.

Hollow-fiber bioreactors are used to generate high concentrations of cell-derived products including monoclonal antibodies, recombinant proteins, growth factors, viruses, and virus-like particles. This is possible because the semi-permeable hollow-fiber membranes allow for the passage of low-molecular-weight nutrients and wastes from the cell-containing EC into the non-cell-containing IC space, but they do not allow the passage of larger products such as antibodies. Therefore, as a cell line (e.g., hybridoma) expands and expresses a target protein, that protein remains within the EC space and is not flushed out. At a given time point (or continually during the culture), the harvest supernatant (product) is collected, clarified, and refrigerated for a future downstream application.

Smaller hollow-fiber bioreactors are often used for selection and optimization of cell lines prior to stepping up to larger cell-culturing systems. Doing so saves on growth-factor costs because a significant portion of the cell-culture media does not require the addition of expensive components like fetal bovine serum. Likewise, the smaller hollow-fiber bioreactors can be housed in a laboratory incubator just like cell-culture plates and flasks.

Recently, hollow-fiber bioreactors have been tested as novel platforms for the commercial production of high-titer influenza A virus. In this study, both adherent and suspension Madin-Darby canine kidney epithelial cells (MDCK) were infected with two different strains of influenza: A/PR/8/34 (H1N1), and the pandemic strain A/Mexico/4108/2009 (H1N1). High titers were achieved for both the suspension and adherent strains; furthermore, the hollow-fiber bioreactor technology was found comparable in its production capacity to that of other commercial bioreactors on the market, including classic stirred-tank and wave bioreactors and ATF perfusion systems.
