= Phase inversion =

Phase inversion may refer to:

- Phase reversal
- Phase inversion (chemistry)
