= Evapoporometry =

Evapoporometry is a method used to determine pore-size in synthetic membranes. Based on the Kelvin equation, this technique is most accurate for detection of pore diameters between 4 nm to 150 nm.

== Theory ==
Evapoporometry uses modified forms of the Kelvin equation to relate the evaporation of a wetting liquid (usually 2-propanol) from a membrane to the average diameter of the pores in that membrane. The primary equation used in this technique is:

$d = -{4yV \over RT*ln(W_A/W^\circ_A) }$

Where $d$ is the pore diameter, $y$ is the surface tension, $V_\text{A}$ is the vapor molar volume, $R$ is the gas constant, $T$ is the absolute temperature, $W_A$ is the instantaneous evaporation rate in $mol/s$, and $W^\circ_A$ is the average evaporation rate of the free-standing liquid layer in $mol/s$.

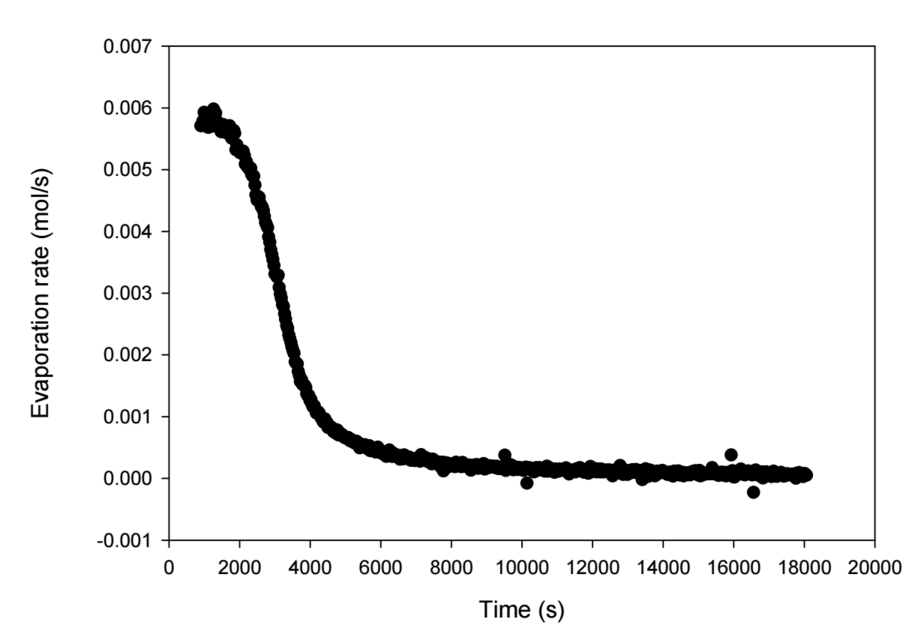
An example schematic of an evapoporometry curve for a synthetic polymeric membrane.

== Method ==
Evapoporometry has the significant advantage of requiring only a lab scale, 2-propanol (or another wetting fluid), and a cell in which to contain the sample and 2-propanol. The sample is immersed for some time in 2-propanol prior to measurement to ensure saturation of pores, and is then placed into the cell in an analytical balance and immersed again in 2-propanol, after which the change in mass due to evaporation of the free-standing liquid layer and then draining of liquid from pores is measured by the analytical balance. Instantaneous evaporation rates are calculated from the mass data and input into the above equation to yield a pore-size distribution for the sample. $W^\circ_A$ can be used to quantitatively determine value of $W_A$ at which pore draining begins, which is equal to $W^\circ_A - 3\sigma$, where $\sigma$ is the standard deviation of $W^\circ_A$. This analysis is enabled by the principle that evaporation from small pores will only occur after 2-propanol in larger pores has completely evaporated.

There exists a nanoscale layer of wetting fluid on both the membrane and the test cell material known as the "t-layer," the mass of which is to be excluded from measurement to increase accuracy, otherwise these points may be incorrectly attributed to subnanometer pores. Akhondi et al describe methods for correction of the t-layers of the test cell and membrane, as well as a correction for swelling of membranes during the experiment. The correction for the t-layer of the test cell itself can be made by performing the evapoporometry procedure as described above with an empty test cell, integrating from the start point of pore draining until the point at which $d$ = 4 nm to yield the mass of the t-layer. This mass plus the mass of the membrane's t-layer will constitute the endpoint of pore diameter calculation for the principal evapoporometry measurement.

== See also ==
- Synthetic membrane
- Porosimetry
- Hollow fiber membrane
