= Phase inversion (chemistry) =

Chemical demixing process used in membrane fabrication and emulsion chemistry

Phase inversion (also called phase separation or demixing) refers to two related phenomena in chemistry and materials science: (1) a controlled phase-separation process widely used to fabricate porous polymer membranes, and (2) the inversion of continuous and dispersed phases in an emulsion.

In membrane fabrication, phase inversion converts an initially homogeneous polymer solution into a solid, porous structure by inducing phase separation and solidification.

== Membrane fabrication ==
Phase inversion is one of the most common routes for producing polymeric membranes used in microfiltration, ultrafiltration, nanofiltration and related separations. In practice, a polymer is dissolved in a solvent (sometimes with additives), shaped as a film or hollow fiber, and then phase-separated to form a polymer-rich phase (matrix) and polymer-lean phase (pores).

=== Main methods ===
==== Diffusion-induced phase separation (DIPS) ====
DIPS is driven by mass transfer between the cast polymer solution and a contacting vapor or liquid, causing local composition changes that induce demixing.

Common DIPS variants include:

- Immersion precipitation (often called non-solvent induced phase separation, NIPS): a cast film/fiber is immersed in a non-solvent coagulation bath, causing solvent ↔ non-solvent exchange and phase separation.
- Vapor-induced phase separation (VIPS): the cast film is exposed to non-solvent vapor (e.g., humid air), allowing gradual uptake of non-solvent and demixing.
- Evaporation/air casting: solvent evaporation changes the composition until phase separation occurs (often used with polymer–solvent–non-solvent systems).

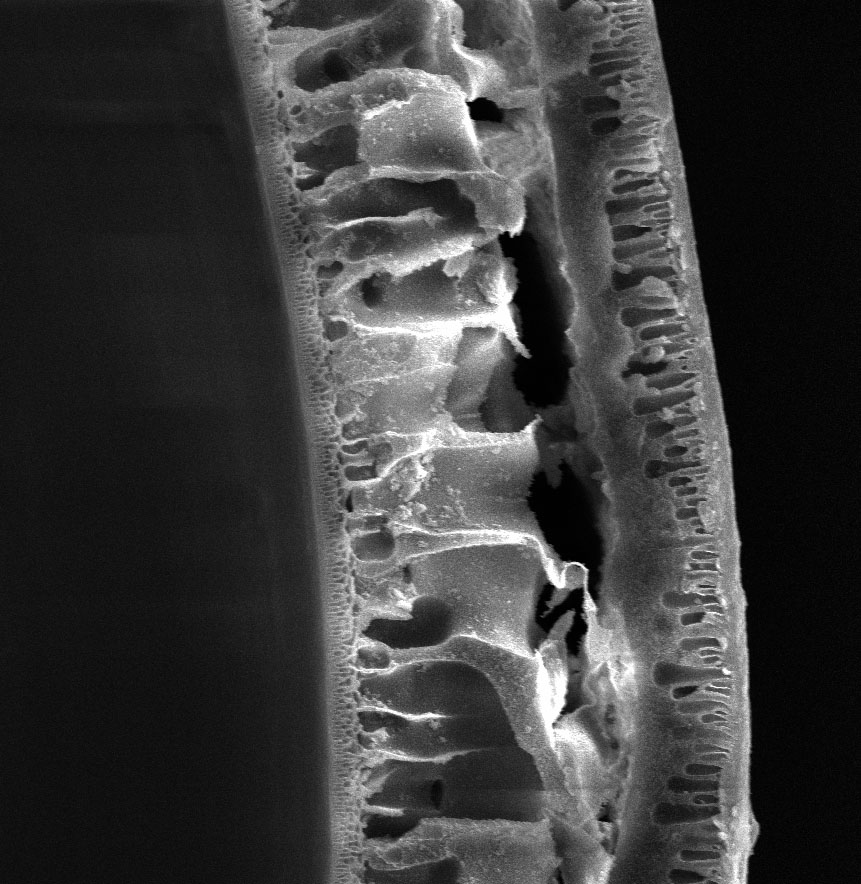
Transverse cross-section of a polysulfone hollow fiber membrane wall manufactured by nonsolvent-induced phase separation (NIPS).

==== Temperature-induced phase separation (TIPS) ====
In TIPS, phase separation is triggered primarily by changing temperature (e.g., cooling a polymer solution prepared at elevated temperature), causing demixing and solidification.

=== Factors affecting membrane morphology ===
The pore structure produced by phase inversion depends on thermodynamics and mass transfer during demixing and solidification, which are influenced by polymer concentration, solvent/non-solvent choice, additives, and process conditions (e.g., bath composition, temperature, exposure time to vapor/air).

== In emulsions ==
In emulsions, phase inversion occurs when the dispersed and continuous phases exchange roles (e.g., water-in-oil to oil-in-water), which can be driven by formulation changes (such as surfactant affinity) or by changing phase volume fractions.

== See also ==
- Membrane
- Membrane technology
- Demixing
- Emulsion
- Phase inversion temperature
- Hollow fiber membrane
