= Perstraction =

Perstraction is a membrane extraction process, where two liquid phases are contacted across a membrane. The desired species in the feed (solute), selectively crosses the membrane into the extracting solution. Perstraction was originally developed to overcome the downsides of liquid–liquid extraction, for example extractant toxicity and emulsion formation. Perstraction has been applied to many fields including fermentation, waste water treatment and alcohol-free beverage production.

== Introduction ==
Perstraction is the separation technique developed from liquid-liquid extraction. Due to the presence of the membrane a wider selection of extractants can be used, this can include the use of miscible solutions, for example the recovery of ammonia from waste water using sulphuric acid.

This process is analogous to pervaporation in some ways. But the permeate is in liquid phase. Perstraction technique eliminates the problem of phase dispersion and separation altogether.

A basic perstraction is called the single perstraction or membrane perstraction. An advantage is minimizing toxic damage to microorganisms or enzymes. Nevertheless, perstraction includes problems like expensive membranes, clogging and fouling of membranes.

== Applications ==
=== Perstraction in butanol fermentation ===
Perstraction has been combined with the ABE (acetone butanol ethanol) fermentation for butanol production. Butanol is toxic to the fermentation, therefore perstraction can be applied to remove the butanol from the vicinity of the bacteria as soon as it is produced. Liquid-liquid extraction (LLE) was combined with the ABE fermentation for in situ product recovery, but the extractants with the highest affinity for butanol tend to be toxic to the bacteria. The application of LLE would also require the extractant to be sterilised prior to contact with the fermentation broth. Perstraction can overcome these problems due to a membrane separating the fermentation broth from the extractant. As an in situ product recovery technique for the ABE fermentation perstraction is still in its development stages.

=== Amino acids separation through the charged membrane ===
A membrane brings many new elements for the separation. Amino acids have been separated by perstraction. Membranes did not only separate extractants and the primary solution but also were selective for amino acids. Charged membranes were used. So they selected amino acids by pKa. Besides the selectivity of a membrane is affected by its thickness, pore diameter and charge potential. The bigger pore is, the better amino acids permeate the membrane. The higher charge potential is, the bigger electrostatic rejection effects are. The thinner membrane, the less it is selective.

=== The clean groundwater ===
Pollutants can be deleted from groundwater by perstraction. Different techniques have been patented. The oldest one has published in 1990 and the youngest one in 1998. In the 2000s has been done few patent applications but no granted patents.

Organic compounds through a membrane has been concentrated from groundwater. The concentration factor is from 1 000 to 10 000 bringing 0.1 ppb concentrations to between 0.1 and 1.0 ppm. Besides the concentration of a contaminant has been analyzed in real-time. The membrane is polymer like polysulphane. The hole diameter is 300 μm and thickness is 30 μm.

=== Removal of pharmaceuticals from water ===
The pharmaceuticals pass sewage treatment plants. They like estrogen conjugates may cause problems. Drugs of the research were common, present in the aquatic environment and inability to be adequately removed by sewage treatment plants. There were seven different drugs in the research. Dibutyl sebacate and oleic acid formed liquid cores in capsules because they do not diffuse away from capsules and have affinity for drugs. Capsule external diameters were 740 μm and 680 μm and internal diameters were 570 μm and 500 μm. Agitation was 300 rpm. Equilibrium times were 30, 50 and 90 minutes.

Since dibutyl sebacate and oleic acid were different affinity for drugs, they were used concurrently. Four drugs were extracted effectively for 40–50 minutes (at least 50% removed). Extraction rates did not change significantly above 150 rpm. Membrane thickness did not affect the result significantly. On the contrary the capsule size was remarkable for mass transfer.

=== Hydrophobic gelganamycin separated from aqueous media ===
An antibiotic called geldanamycin was separated from media by the capsular perstraction. Geldanamycin is hydrophobic. Outer particle diameter varied from than less 500 to 750 μm. Alginate formed the shell of capsule and its thickness varied from 30 to 90 μm. Dibutyl sebacate or oleic acid as liquid core extracted geldanamycin well. The bigger agitation and thinner capsule membrane were, the faster transfer rate was.

Geldanamycin was back-extracted from capsules. Dibutyl sebacate capsules were disposable because liquid core came out from capsules in the back-extraction. On the contrary, oleic acid remained in capsules during the back-extraction when an extractant was saturated with oleic acid. Nevertheless, the presence of oleic acid in the back-extraction solution demanded more purification steps (precipitation, centrifugation and filtration). Oleic acid was removed because it prevents crystallization of geldanamycin. Therefore, geldanamycin was crystallized and the end product was highly purified.

Enzymes can be immobilized to the capsule membrane. In this case, the capsule external diameter was 500 μm and internal diameter 300 μm. The product of enzyme-catalyzed reaction can be concentrated to capsules and the end-product inhibition is low. Enzyme recycling could be performed by back-extracting the product. The technique has been applied to the hydrolysis of penicillin G.

== See also ==
Osmosis - A process by which solvent molecules cross between liquids separated by a membrane
