= Mixed liquor suspended solids =

Solid material produced during wastewater treatment

Mixed liquor suspended solids (MLSS) is the concentration of suspended solids, in an aeration tank during the activated sludge process, which occurs during the treatment of waste water. The units MLSS is primarily measured in milligram per litre (mg/L), but for activated sludge its mostly measured in gram per litre [g/L] which is equal to kilogram per cubic metre [kg/m3]. Mixed liquor is a combination of raw or unsettled wastewater or pre-settled wastewater and activated sludge within an aeration tank. MLSS consists mostly of microorganisms and non-biodegradable suspended matter. MLSS is an important part of the activated sludge process to ensure that there is a sufficient quantity of active biomass available to consume the applied quantity of organic pollutant at any time. This is known as the food to microorganism ratio, more commonly notated as the F/M ratio. By maintaining this ratio at the appropriate level the biomass will consume high percentages of the food. This minimizes the loss of residual food in the treated effluent. In simple terms, the more the biomass consumes the lower the biochemical oxygen demand (BOD) will be in the discharge. It is important that MLSS removes COD and BOD in order to purify water for clean surface waters, and subsequently clean drinking water and hygiene. Raw sewage enters in the water treatment process with a concentration of sometimes several hundred mg/L of BOD. Upon being treated by screening, pre-settling, activated sludge processes or other methods of treatment, the concentration of BOD in water can be lowered to less than 2 mg/L, which is considered to be clean, safe to discharge to surface waters or to reuse water.

The total weight of MLSS within an aeration tank can be calculated by multiplying the concentration of MLSS (kg/m3) in the aeration tank by the tank volume (m3).

== Overview ==
MLSS is responsible for removing the biochemical oxygen demand make-up of a large portion of the solids that are retained in the activated sludge process within the water treatment process. They are the "active" part of the activated sludge process. Mixed liquor suspended solids are the solids under aeration. MLSS is measured by filtering a known volume of the mixed liquor sample, which is the same way that suspended solids are measured in wastewater. Some of the MLSS may be an inorganic material. Sometimes this may represent a large percentage of the solids present in the wastewater.

Environmental engineering focuses on the particles suspended in water and the suitable operation of water treatment plants. Therefore, it is important to measure the total mass of suspended solids, which is the MLSS, as well as the mass of organic matter suspended in the activated sludge unit. These measurements allow engineers to adjust the flow rate of return sludge from the secondary clarifier into the secondary treatment reactor. This ensures that influent organic matter will be treated with a correct concentration of microorganisms.

== Mixed liquor volatile suspended solids ==
The portion of the MLSS that is actually eating the incoming food(in terms of COD & BOD) is referred to as the Mixed Liquor Volatile Suspended Solids (MLVSS). The volatile solids concentration in a sample of mixed liquor will consist mostly of microorganisms and organic matter. As a result, the volatile solids concentration of mixed liquor is approximately equal to the amount of microorganisms in the water and can be used to determine whether there are enough microorganisms present to purify the water.

== Separation and Removal process ==
MLSS is separated from the treated or purified water by settling in a settling tank in the activated sludge process. The excess sludge has to be removed from the system.

== Effects in water treatment ==
=== If content is too high ===
- The process is prone to bulking of solids and the treatment system can become overloaded.
- This can cause the dissolved oxygen content to drop; this may reduce the efficiency of nitrification and the settleability of the sludge.
- Excessive aeration will be required which wastes electricity.

it will create thick foam on upper surface layer.

=== If content is too low ===
- The process may not remove sufficient organic matter from the wastewater.
- The sludge age may be too low to enable nitrification.

The typical control band for the concentration of MLSS is 2 to 4 g/L for conventional activated sludge, or up to 15 g/L for membrane bioreactors.

One of the easiest control procedures for activated sludge systems is the Constant Mixed Liquor Suspended Solids method. In this method, the operator selects a certain MLSS concentration or range of mix liquor concentrations that produces the best effluent and the highest removal efficiencies. This specific value or range must be calculated depending on COD or BOD load [kg/d]. When the operator finds the optimum MLSS concentration for each plant, they attempt to maintain this value by adjusting the sludge wasting or sludge excess rate. One rule of thumb for activated sludge systems is that for every pound of BOD removed in the secondary system a half a pound of new solids is generated through reproduction of the organisms and addition of new organisms from the influent wastes. So, the operator tries to waste the proper amount of solids to keep their selected optimum mix liquor concentration constant. If the MLSS concentration is above the desired concentration, the wasting of the excess solids will have to be started or increased. If the MLSS concentration is below the desired concentration level, wasting should be decreased or stopped.

== Calculations ==
MLSS (g/L) = SV [mL/L]/SVI [mL/g] or SVI [mL/g] = SV30 [mL/L]/MLSS (g/L)

Where:
SVI = sludge volume index (mL/g)
SV30 = Volume of settled solids per 1 litre after 30 minutes

In fact SVI is a calculation from two analyses : SV30 and MLSS.

0=(Q+Q_{r})(X')-(Q_{r}X'_{r}+Q_{s}X'_{r})

Where:
Q = wastewater flow rate (m^{3}/d)
Q_{r} = return sludge flow rate (m^{3}/d)
X' = MLSS (kg/m^{3})
X'_{r} = return sludge concentration (kg/m^{3})
Q_{s} = sludge surplus (or excess) flow rate (m^{3}/d)

This equilibrium formula for settling tanks is mostly calculated for the initial flows in m3/h. This formula describes that the incoming amount of MLSS in a settler should be equivalent to the outcoming amount of MLSS via the return sludge flow. This equilibrium is only valid if the effluent water contains a low concentration in suspended solids. In normal conditions the excess amount is very low in comparison to the return amount, and for that reason many times the excess amount is neglected. In that case the formula will be : (Q+Q_{r})(X') = (Q_{r}X'_{r})

== Sources ==
- Davis, Mackenzie Leo, and David A. Cornwell. Introduction to Environmental Engineering. Dubuque, IA: McGraw-Hill Companies, 2008. Print.
- Gray, N. F. Biology of Wastewater Treatment. London: Imperial College, 2004. Print.
- Davis, Mackenzie Leo, and David A. Cornwell. Introduction to Environmental Engineering. Boston, MA: WCB McGraw-Hill, 1998. Print.
- http://www.cee.mtu.edu/~nurban/classes/CE3502/spring12/modelreports/MLSSreport.pdf
- http://ragsdaleassociates.com/WastewaterSystemOperatorsManual/Chapter%208%20-%20Activated%20Sludge.pdf
