= Membrane bioreactor =

Combination technology for wastewater treatment

Membrane bioreactors (MBR) are combinations of membrane processes like microfiltration or ultrafiltration with a biological wastewater treatment process, the activated sludge process. These technologies are now widely used for municipal and industrial wastewater treatment. The two basic membrane bioreactor configurations are the submerged membrane bioreactor and the side stream membrane bioreactor. In the submerged configuration, the membrane is located inside the biological reactor and submerged in the wastewater, while in a side stream membrane bioreactor, the membrane is located outside the reactor as an additional step after biological treatment.

Due to their compact design and effluent quality, MBR systems are widely implemented in municipal and industrial wastewater treatment plants where stringent discharge or reuse standards apply.

== Overview ==
Water scarcity has prompted efforts to reuse waste water once it has been properly treated, known as "water reclamation" (also called wastewater reuse, water reuse, or water recycling). Among the treatment technologies available to reclaim wastewater, membrane processes stand out for their capacity to retain solids and salts and even to disinfect water, producing water suitable for reuse in irrigation and other applications.

A semipermeable membrane is a material that allows the selective flow of certain substances. In the case of water purification or regeneration, the aim is to allow the water to flow through the membrane whilst retaining undesirable particles on the originating side. By varying the type of membrane, it is possible to get better pollutant retention of different kinds. Some of the required characteristics in a membrane for wastewater treatment are chemical and mechanical resistance for five years of operation and capacity to operate stably over a wide pH range.

There are two main types of membrane materials available on the market: organic-based polymeric membranes and ceramic membranes. Polymeric membranes are the most commonly used materials in water and wastewater treatment. In particular, polyvinylidene difluoride (PVDF) is the most prevalent material due to its long lifetime and chemical and mechanical resistance.

Polymeric Membrane Materials
PAN	Polyacrylonitrile
(HD)PE	(High density) polyethylene
PES	Polyethylsulphone
PS	Polysulphone
PTFE	Polytetrafluoroethylene
PVDF	Polyvinylidine difluoride

Ceramic Membrane Materials
Al2O3 SiC TiO2 ZrO2	Aluminum oxide / Alumina Silicon carbide Titanium dioxide / Titania Zirconium dioxide / Zirconia

Comparison: Polymeric vs Ceramic Membranes
Polymeric	Ceramic
Subject to mechanical damage	Higher mechanical strength
Bundles of hundreds of hollow fibers	One "piece" per element
Vulnerable to chemicals	Good chemical resistance
Lower cost in terms of capacity	High capital costs
Very common product	Little operational experience
Majority of commercial products	Few applications

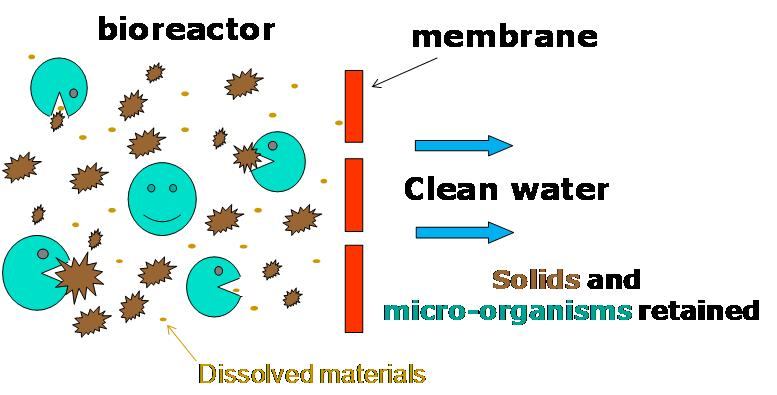
Simple schematic describing the MBR process

When used with domestic wastewater, membrane bioreactor processes can produce effluent of high enough quality for discharge into the oceans, surfaces, brackish bodies, or urban irrigation waterways. Other advantages of membrane bioreactors over conventional processes include reduced footprints and simpler retrofitting.

It is possible to operate membrane bioreactor processes at higher mixed liquor suspended solids concentrations compared to conventional settlement separation systems, thus reducing the reactor volume to achieve the same loading rate.

Schematic of conventional activated sludge process (top) and external (side stream) membrane bioreactor (bottom)

Recent technical innovation and significant membrane cost reduction have enabled membrane bioreactors to become an established process option to treat wastewater. Membrane bioreactors have become an attractive option for the treatment and reuse of industrial and municipal wastewater, as evidenced by their consistently rising numbers and capacity. The current membrane bioreactor market was estimated to be worth around US$216 million in 2006 and US$838.2 million in 2011, grounding projections that the market for membrane bioreactors was growing at an average rate of 22.4% and would reach a market size of US$3.44 billion in 2018.

The global membrane bioreactor market is expected to grow in the near future due to various driving forces, for instance increasing scarcity of water worldwide which makes wastewater reclamation more profitable; this will likely be further aggravated by continuing climate change. Growing environmental concerns over industrial wastewater disposal along with declining freshwater resources across developing economies also account for increasing demand for membrane bioreactor technology. Population growth, urbanization, and industrialization will further complicate the business outlook.

However, high initial investments and operational expenditure may hamper the global membrane bioreactor market. In addition, technological limitations, particularly the recurrent costs of membrane fouling, are likely to hinder production adoption. Ongoing research and development progress toward increasing output and minimizing sludge formation are anticipated to fuel industry growth.

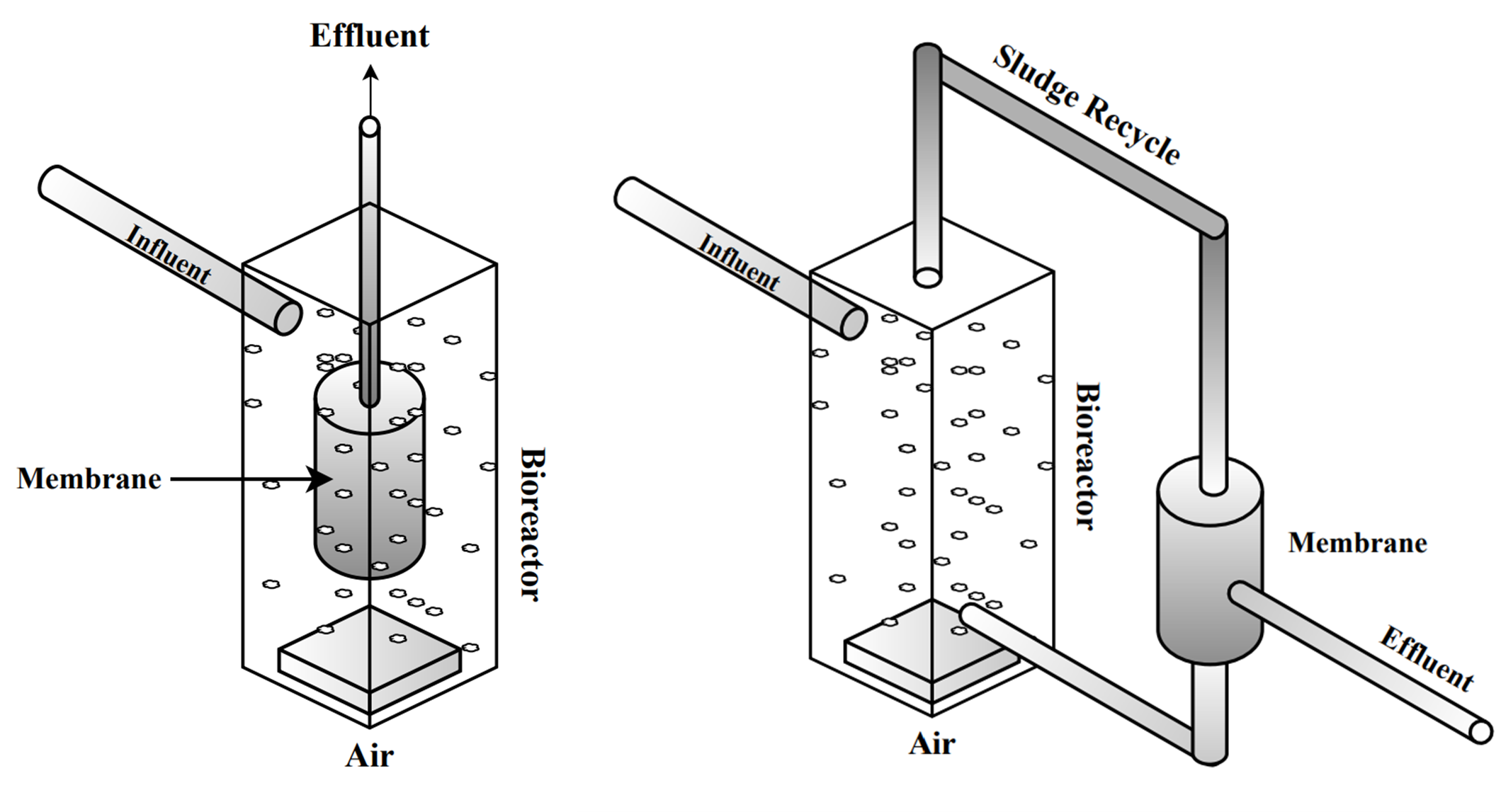
Simplified illustrations of a submerged and side-stream MBR.

Membrane bioreactors can be used to reduce the footprint of an activated sludge sewage treatment system by removing some of the liquid components of the mixed liquor. This leaves a concentrated waste product that is then treated using the activated sludge process.

Recent studies show the opportunity to use nanomaterials for the realization of more efficient and sustainable membrane bioreactors for wastewater treatment.

== History and basic operating parameters ==
Membrane bioreactors were introduced in the late 1960s, shortly after commercial-scale ultrafiltration and microfiltration membranes became available. The original designs were introduced by Dorr-Oliver Inc. and combined the use of an activated sludge bioreactor with a cross-flow membrane filtration loop. The flat sheet membranes used in this process were polymeric and featured pore sizes ranging from 0.003 to 0.01 μm. Although the idea of replacing the settling tank of the conventional activated sludge process was attractive, it was difficult to justify the use of such a process because of the high cost of membranes, the low economic value of the product (tertiary effluent) and sometimes rapid losses of performance due to membrane fouling. As a result, the initial design focus was on the attainment of high fluxes, and it was, therefore, necessary to pump the mixed liquor and its suspended solids at high cross-flow velocity at significant energy demand (of the order 10 kWh/m^{3} product) to reduce fouling. Because of the poor economics of the first-generation devices, they only found applications in niche areas with special needs such as isolated trailer parks or ski resorts.

The next breakthrough for the membrane bioreactor came in 1989 with the introduction of submerged membrane bioreactor configurations. Until then, membrane bioreactors were designed with a separation device located external to the reactor (side stream membrane bioreactors) and relied on high trans-membrane pressure to maintain filtration. The submerged configuration takes advantage of coarse bubble aeration to produce mixing and limit fouling. The energy demand of the submerged system can be up to 2 orders of magnitude lower than that of the side stream systems and submerged systems operate at a lower flux, demanding more membrane area. In submerged configurations, aeration is considered as one of the major parameters in process performance both hydraulic and biological. Aeration maintains solids in suspension, scours the membrane surface, and provides oxygen to the biomass, leading to better biodegradability and cell synthesis. Submerged membrane bioreactor systems became preferred to side stream configurations, especially for domestic wastewater treatment.

The next key steps in membrane bioreactor development were the acceptance of modest fluxes (25 percent or less of those in the first generation) and the idea to use two-phase (bubbly) flow to control fouling. The lower operating cost obtained with the submerged configuration along with the steady decrease in the membrane cost led to an exponential increase in membrane bioreactor plant installations from the mid-1990s. Since then, further improvements in membrane bioreactor design and operation have been introduced and incorporated into larger plants. While earlier devices were operated at solid retention times as high as 100 days with mixed liquor suspended solids up to 30 g/L, the recent trend is to apply lower solid retention times (around 10–20 days), resulting in more manageable suspended solids levels (10 to 15 g/L). Thanks to these new operating conditions, the oxygen transfer and the pumping cost in the reactors have tended to decrease and the overall maintenance has been simplified. There is now a range of membrane bioreactor systems available commercially, most of which use submerged membranes although some side stream modules are available; these side stream systems also use two-phase flow for fouling control. Typical hydraulic retention times range between 3 and 10 hours. For the most part, hollow fiber and flat sheet membrane configurations are utilized in membrane bioreactor applications.

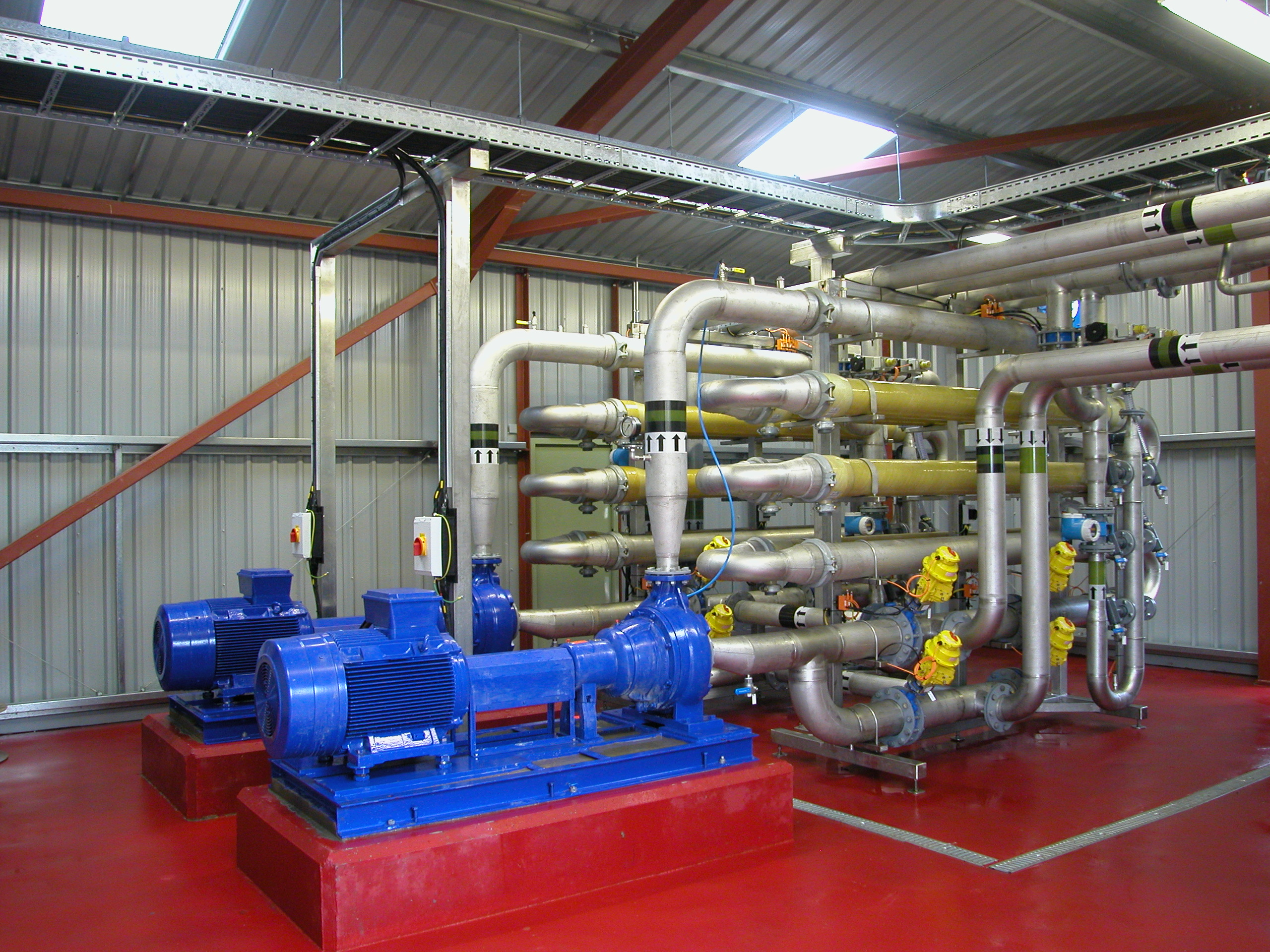
UF membrane side stream configuration

Despite the more favorable energy usage of submerged membranes, there continued to be a market for the side stream configuration, particularly in smaller flow industrial applications. For ease of maintenance, side stream configurations can be installed on a lower level in a plant building, and thus membrane replacement can be undertaken without specialized lifting equipment. As a result, research and development has continued to improve the side stream configurations, and this has culminated in recent years with the development of low energy systems which incorporate more sophisticated control of the operating parameters coupled with periodic backwashes, which enable sustainable operation at energy usage as low as 0.3 kWh/m3 of product.

== Configurations ==
=== Internal/submerged/immersed ===
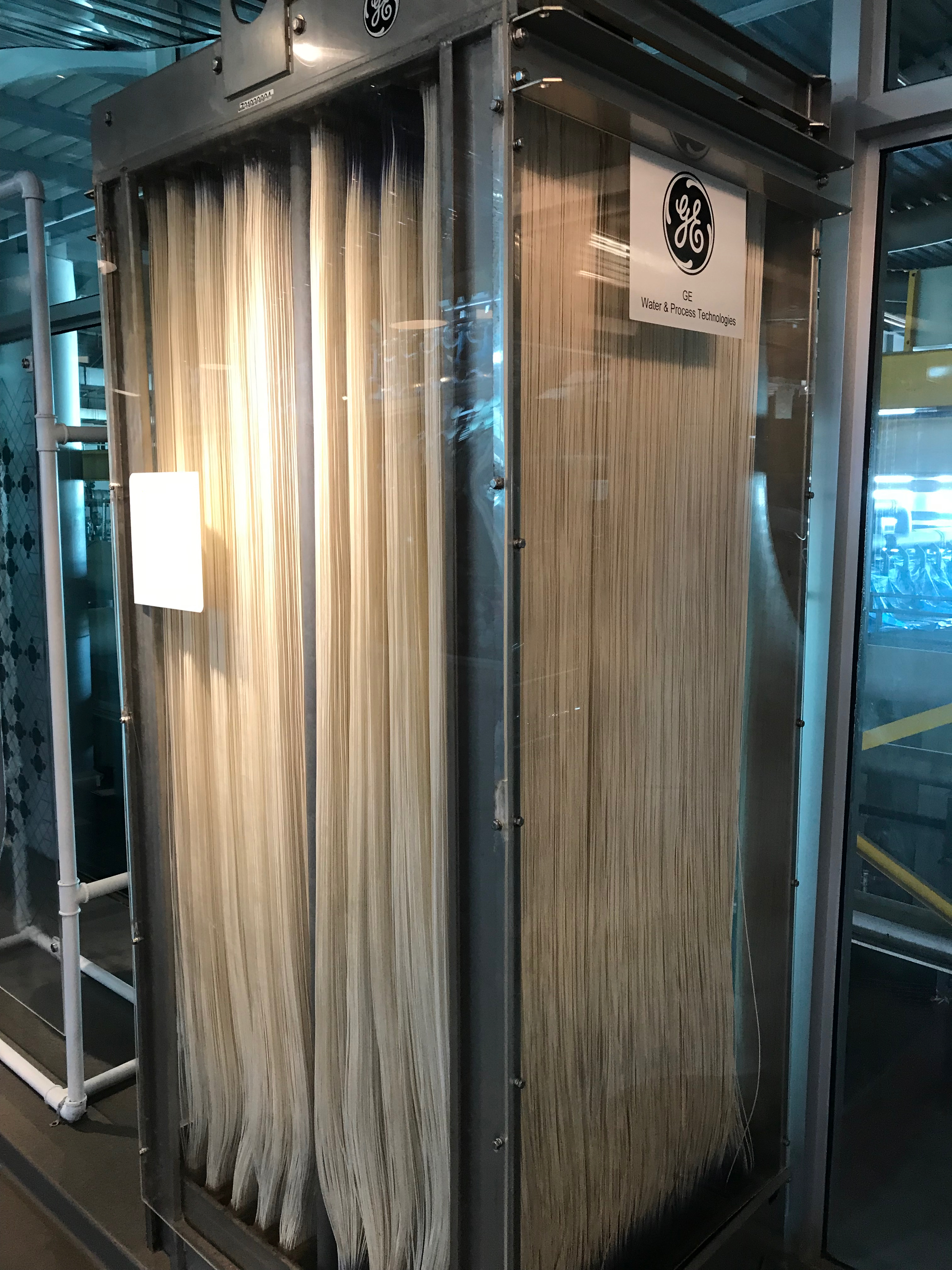
A reinforced immersed hollow fiber membrane cassette

In the immersed Membrane Bioreactor (iMBR) configuration, the filtration element is installed in either the main bioreactor vessel or in a separate tank. The modules are positioned above the aeration system, fulfilling two functions, the supply of oxygen and the cleaning of the membranes. The membranes can be a flat sheet or tubular or a combination of both and can incorporate an online backwash system which reduces membrane surface fouling by pumping membrane permeate back through the membrane. In systems where the membranes are in a separate tank from the bioreactor, individual trains of membranes can be isolated to undertake cleaning regimes incorporating membrane soaks, however, the biomass must be continuously pumped back to the main reactor to limit mixed liquor suspended solids concentration increases. Additional aeration is also required to provide air scouring to reduce fouling. Where the membranes are installed in the main reactor, membrane modules are removed from the vessel and transferred to an offline cleaning tank. Usually, the internal/submerged configuration is used for larger-scale lower strength applications. To optimize the reactor volume and minimize the production of sludge, submerged membrane bioreactor systems typically operate with mixed liquor suspended solids concentrations comprised between 12000 mg/L and 20000 mg/L, hence they offer good flexibility in the selection of the design Sludge retention time. It is mandatory to take into account that an excessively high content of mixed liquor suspended solids may render the aeration system less effective; the classical solution to this optimization problem is to ensure a concentration of mixed liquor suspended solids which approaches 10.000 mg/L to guarantee a good mass transfer of oxygen with a good permeation flux. This type of solution is widely accepted in larger-scale units, where the internal/submerged configuration is typically used, because of the higher relative cost of the membrane compared to the additional tank volume required.

Immersed MBR has been the preferred configuration due to its low energy consumption level, high biodegradation efficiency, and low fouling rate compared to side stream membrane bioreactors. In addition, iMBR systems can handle higher suspended solids concentrations, while traditional systems work only with suspended solids concentrations between 2.5 and 3.5, iMBR can handle concentrations between 4 and 12 g/L, an increase in range of 300%. This type of configuration is adopted in industrial sectors including textile, food & beverage, oil & gas, mining, power generation, pulp & paper.

=== External/side stream ===
In side stream membrane bioreactor technology, the filtration modules are outside the aerobic tank, hence the name side-stream configuration. Like the immersed or submerged configuration, the aeration system is also used to clean and supply oxygen to the bacteria that degrade the organic compounds. The biomass is either pumped directly through several membrane modules in series and back to the bioreactor or the biomass is pumped to a bank of modules, from which a second pump circulates the biomass through the modules in series. Cleaning and soaking of the membranes can be undertaken in situ with the use of an installed cleaning tank, pump, and pipework. The quality of the final product is such that it can be reused in process applications due to the filtration capacity of the micro- and ultrafiltration membranes.

Usually, the external/side stream configuration is used for smaller scale and higher strength applications; the main advantage that the external/side stream configuration shows is the possibility to design and size the tank and the membrane separately, with practical advantages for the operation and the maintenance of the unit. As in other membrane processes, a shear over the membrane surface is needed to prevent or limit fouling; the external/side stream configuration provides this shear using a pumping system, while the internal/submerged configuration provides the shear through aeration in the bioreactor, and there is an energy requirement to promote the shear by pumping. In this configuration fouling is more consistent due to the higher fluxes involved.

== Major considerations ==
=== Fouling and fouling control ===
Membrane bioreactor filtration performance inevitably decreases with filtration time due to the deposition of soluble and particulate materials onto and into the membrane, attributable to the interactions between activated sludge components and the membrane. This major drawback and process limitation has been under investigation since the earliest membrane bioreactors and remains one of the most challenging issues facing further development.

Fouling is the process by which the particles (colloidal particles, solute macromolecules) are deposited or adsorbed onto the membrane surface or pores by physical and chemical interactions or mechanical action. This produces a reduction in size or blockage of membrane pores.

Membrane fouling can cause severe flux drops and affects the quality of the water produced. Severe fouling may require intense chemical cleaning or membrane replacement. This increases the operating costs of a treatment plant. Membrane fouling has traditionally been thought to occur through four mechanisms: 1) complete pore blocking, 2) standard blocking, 3) intermediate blocking, and 4) cake layer formation. There are various types of foulants: biological (bacteria, fungi), colloidal (clays, flocs), scaling (mineral precipitates), and organic (oils, polyelectrolytes, humics).

Membrane fouling can be accommodated either by allowing a decrease in permeation flux while holding transmembrane pressure constant or by increasing transmembrane pressure to maintain constant flux. Most wastewater treatment plants are operated in constant flux mode, and hence fouling phenomena are generally tracked via the variation of transmembrane pressure with time. In recent reviews covering membrane applications to bioreactors, it has been shown that, as with other membrane separation processes, membrane fouling is the most serious problem affecting system performance. Fouling leads to a significant increase in hydraulic resistance, manifested as permeate flux declines or transmembrane pressure increases when the process is operated under constant-transmembrane-pressure or constant-flux conditions respectively. In systems where flux is maintained by increasing transmembrane pressure, the energy required to achieve filtration increases. Frequent membrane cleaning is an alternative that significantly increases operating costs as a result of added cleaning agent costs, added production downtime, and more frequent membrane replacement.

Membrane fouling results from the interaction between a membrane material and the components of the activated sludge liquor, which include biological flocs formed by a large range of living or dead microorganisms along with soluble and colloidal compounds. The suspended biomass has no fixed composition and varies with feed water composition and reactor operating conditions. Thus, though many investigations of membrane fouling have been published, the diverse range of operating conditions and feedwater matrices employed, the different analytical methods used, and the limited information reported in most studies on the suspended biomass composition, have made it difficult to establish any generic behavior pertaining to membrane fouling in membrane bioreactors specifically.

Factors influencing fouling (interactions in red)

Air-induced cross flow in submerged membrane bioreactors can efficiently remove or at least reduce the fouling layer on the membrane surface. A recent review reports the latest findings on applications of aeration in submerged membrane configuration and describes the performance benefits of gas bubbling. The choice of aeration rate is a key parameter in submerged membrane bioreactor design, as there is generally an optimal air flow rate beyond which further increases in aeration have no benefits for preventing fouling.

Many other antifouling strategies can be applied in membrane bioreactor applications. They include, for example:

- Intermittent permeation or relaxation, where the filtration is stopped at regular time intervals before being resumed. Particles deposited on the membrane surface tend to diffuse back to the reactor; this phenomenon will be increased by the continuous aeration applied during this resting period.
- Membrane backwashing, where permeate water is pumped back to the membrane and flows through the pores to the feed channel, dislodging internal and external foulants.
- Air backwashing, where pressurized air in the membrane's permeate side builds up and releases a significant pressure within a very short period of time. Membrane modules, therefore, need to be in a pressurized vessel coupled to a vent system. Air usually does not go through the membrane. If it did, the air would dry the membrane and a re-wet step would be necessary, accomplished by pressurizing the feed side of the membrane.
- Proprietary antifouling products, such as Nalco's Membrane Performance Enhancer Technology.

In addition, different types and intensities of chemical cleaning may also be recommended on typical schedules:

- Chemically enhanced backwash (daily);
- Maintenance cleaning with higher chemical concentration (weekly);
- Intensive chemical cleaning (once or twice a year).

Intensive cleaning may also be carried out when further filtration cannot be sustained because of an elevated transmembrane pressure. Each of the four membrane bioreactor suppliers Kubota, Xylem, Mitsubishi and GE Water have their own chemical cleaning recipes; these differ mainly in terms of concentration and methods (see Table 1). Under normal conditions, the prevalent cleaning agents are NaOCl (sodium hypochlorite) and citric acid. It is common for membrane bioreactor suppliers to adapt specific protocols for chemical cleanings (i.e. chemical concentrations and cleaning frequencies) for individual facilities.

Intensive chemical cleaning protocols for four MBR suppliers (the exact protocol for chemical cleaning can vary from a plant to another)

=== Biological performances/kinetics ===
==== Chemical oxygen demand removal and sludge yield ====
Simply due to the high number of microorganisms in membrane bioreactors, pollutant uptake rates can be increased. This leads to better degradation in a given time span or to smaller required reactor volumes. In comparison to conventional activated sludge process treatments which typically achieve 95 percent removal, removal can be increased to 96 to 99 percent in membrane bioreactors (see table,). Chemical oxygen demand (COD) and biological oxygen demand (BOD5) removal is found to increase with mixed liquor suspended solids concentration. Above 15 g/L, COD removal becomes almost independent of biomass concentration at >96 percent. Arbitrary high suspended solids concentrations are not employed, however, lest oxygen transfer be impeded due to higher viscosity and non-Newtonian viscosity effects. Kinetics may also differ due to easier substrate access. In typical activated sludge process treatment, flocs may reach several 100 μm in size. This means that the substrate can reach the active sites only by diffusion which causes an additional resistance and limits the overall reaction rate (diffusion-controlled). Hydrodynamic stress in membrane bioreactors reduces floc size (to 3.5 μm in side stream configurations) and thereby increases the effective reaction rate. Like in the conventional activated sludge process, sludge yield is decreased at higher solids retention times or biomass concentrations. Little or no sludge is produced at sludge loading rates of 0.01 kgCOD/(kgMLSS d). Because of the imposed biomass concentration limit, such low loading rates would result in enormous tank sizes or long hydrodynamic residence times in conventional activated sludge processes.

==== Nutrient removal ====
Nutrient removal is one of the main concerns in modern wastewater treatment, especially, in areas that are sensitive to eutrophication. Nitrogen (N) is a pollutant present in wastewater that must be eliminated for multiple reasons: it reduces dissolved oxygen in surface waters, is toxic to the aquatic ecosystem, poses a risk to public health, and together with phosphorus (P), are responsible for the excessive growth of photosynthetic organisms like algae. All these factors make its reduction focus on wastewater treatment. In wastewater, nitrogen can be present in multiple forms. Like in the conventional activated sludge process, currently, the most widely applied technology for N-removal from municipal wastewater is nitrification combined with denitrification, carried out by bacteria nitrifying and the involvement of facultative organisms. Besides phosphorus precipitation, enhanced biological phosphorus removal can be implemented which requires an additional anaerobic process step. Some characteristics for membrane bioreactor technology render enhanced biological phosphorus removal in combination with post-denitrification an attractive alternative that achieves very low nutrient effluent concentrations. For this, a membrane bioreactor improves the retention of solids, which provides a better biotreatment, supporting the development of slower-growing microorganisms, especially nitrifying ones, so that it makes them especially effective in the elimination of N (nitrification).

Nutrients removal in MBRs for municipal wastewater treatment

==== Anaerobic MBRs ====
Anaerobic membrane bioreactors (sometimes abbreviated AnMBR) were introduced in the 1980s in South Africa. However, anaerobic processes are normally used when a low-cost treatment is required that enables energy recovery but does not achieve advanced treatment (low carbon removal, no nutrients removal). In contrast, membrane-based technologies enable advanced treatment (disinfection), but at a high energy cost. Therefore, the combination of both can only be economically viable if a compact process for energy recovery is desired, or when disinfection is required after anaerobic treatment (cases of water reuse with nutrients). If maximal energy recovery is desired, a single anaerobic process will always be superior to a combination with a membrane process.

Recently, anaerobic membrane bioreactors have seen successful full-scale application to the treatment of some types of industrial wastewaters—typically high-strength wastes. Example applications include the treatment of alcohol stillage wastewater in Japan and the treatment of salad dressing/barbecue sauce wastewater in the United States.

=== Mixing and hydrodynamics ===
Like in any other reactors, the hydrodynamics (or mixing) within a membrane bioreactor plays an important role in determining the pollutant removal and fouling control within the system. It has a substantial effect on energy usage and size requirements, and therefore the whole life cost of a membrane bioreactor is high.

The removal of pollutants is greatly influenced by the length of time fluid elements spend in the membrane bioreactor (i.e. the residence time distribution). The residence time distribution is a description of the hydrodynamics of mixing in the system and it is determined by the design of the reactor (e.g. size, inlet/recycle flow rates, wall/baffle/mixer/aerator positioning, mixing energy input). An example of the effect of mixing is that a continuous stirred-tank reactor will not have as high pollutant conversion per unit volume of reactor as a plug flow reactor.

The control of fouling, as previously mentioned, is primarily achieved via coarse bubble aeration. The distribution of bubbles around the membranes, the shear at the membrane surface for cake removal and the size of the bubble are greatly influenced by the hydrodynamics of the system. The mixing within the system can also influence the production of possible foulants. For example, vessels not completely mixed (i.e. plug flow reactors) are more susceptible to the effects of shock loads which may cause cell lysis and release of soluble microbial products.

Example of computational fluid dynamic (CFD) modelling results (streamlines) for a full-scale MBR (Adapted from the Project AMEDEUS – Australian Node Newsletter August 2007).

Many factors affect the hydrodynamics of wastewater processes and hence membrane bioreactors. These range from physical properties (e.g. mixture rheology and gas/liquid/solid density etc.) to fluid boundary conditions (e.g. inlet/outlet/recycle flow rates, baffle/mixer position etc.). However, some factors are peculiar to membrane bioreactors and these include the filtration tank design (e.g. membrane type, multiple outlets attributed to membranes, membrane packing density, membrane orientation, etc.) and its operation (e.g. membrane relaxation, membrane backflush, etc.).

The mixing modeling and design techniques applied to membrane bioreactors are very similar to those used for conventional activated sludge systems. They include the relatively quick and easy compartmental modelling technique which will only derive the residence time distribution of a process (e.g. the reactor) or a process unit (e.g. the membrane filtration vessel) and which relies on broad assumptions of the mixing properties of each sub-unit. Computational fluid dynamics modeling, on the other hand, does not rely on broad assumptions about the mixing characteristics and instead attempts to predict the hydrodynamics from a fundamental level. It is applicable to all scales of fluid flow and can reveal much information about the mixing in a process, ranging from the residence time distribution to the shear profile on a membrane surface. A visualization of such modeling results is shown in the image.

Investigations of membrane bioreactor hydrodynamics have occurred at many different scales ranging from examination of shear stress at the membrane surface to residence time distribution analysis for a complete membrane bioreactor. Cui et al. (2003) investigated the movement of Taylor bubbles through tubular membranes. Khosravi, M. (2007) examined an entire membrane filtration vessel using CFD and velocity measurements. Brannock et al. (2007) examined an entire MBR system using tracer study experiments and RTD analysis.

== Advantages ==
Some of the advantages provided by membrane bioreactors are as follows.

- High quality effluent: given the small size of the membrane's pores, the effluent is clear and pathogen free.
- Independent control of solids retention time and hydraulic retention time: As all the biological solids are contained in the bioreactor, the solids retention time can be controlled independently from the hydrodynamic retention time.
- Small footprint: thanks to the membrane filtration, there is a high biomass concentration contained in a small volume.
- Robust to load variations: membrane bioreactors can be operated with a broad range of operation conditions.
- Compact process: compared to the conventional activated sludge process, membrane bioreactors are more compact.

== Market framework ==
The market for membrane bioreactors is segmented based on end-user type, such as municipal and industrial users, and end-user geography, for instance Europe, Middle East and Africa (EMEA), Asia-Pacific (APAC), and the Americas. In this line, in 2016, some studies and reports showed that the Asia-Pacific (APAC) region took the lead in terms of market share, owning 41.90%. On the other hand, the Middle East and Africa (EMEA) region's market share is approximately 31.34% and the Americas constitute 26.67% of the market. APAC has the largest membrane bioreactors market. India, China, Indonesia, and the Philippines are major contributors to growth in this market region.

== See also ==
- List of waste-water treatment technologies
- Activated sludge model
- Membrane fouling
- Hollow fiber membrane
