= Membrane-introduction mass spectrometry =

Membrane-introduction mass spectrometry (MIMS) is a method of introducing analytes into the mass spectrometer's vacuum chamber via a semi-permeable membrane. Usually a thin, gas-permeable, hydrophobic membrane is used, for example polydimethylsiloxane. Samples can be almost any fluid including water, air or sometimes even solvents. The great advantage of the method of sample introduction is its simplicity. MIMS can be used to measure a variety of analytes in real-time, with little or no sample preparation. MIMS is most useful for the measurement of small, non-polar molecules, since molecules of this type have a greater affinity for the membrane material than the sample. The advantage of this method is that complex samples that cannot diffuse through the membrane are not incorporated into the mass spectroscopic measurements, highlighting the simplicity of only analyzing (small) molecules of interest.

== See also ==
- Atmospheric pressure chemical ionization
- Liquid chromatography-mass spectrometry
