= Porosimetry =

Measurement and characterization of the porosity of a material

Porosimetry is an analytical technique used to determine various quantifiable aspects of a material's porous structure, such as pore diameter, total pore volume, surface area, and bulk and absolute densities.

The technique involves the intrusion of a non-wetting liquid (often mercury) at high pressure into a material through the use of a porosimeter. The pore size can be determined based on the external pressure needed to force the liquid into a pore against the opposing force of the liquid's surface tension.

A force balance equation known as Washburn's equation for the above material having cylindrical pores is given as:

$$P_L - P_G = -\frac{4 \sigma \cos \theta}{D_P}$$

$P_{L}$ = pressure of liquid
$P_{G}$ = pressure of gas
$\sigma$ = surface tension of liquid
$\theta$ = contact angle of intrusion liquid
$D_{P}$ = pore diameter

Since the technique is usually performed within a vacuum, the initial gas pressure is zero. The contact angle of mercury with most solids is between 135° and 142°, so an average of 140° can be taken without much error. The surface tension of mercury at 20 °C under vacuum is 480 mN/m. With the various substitutions, the equation becomes:

$$D_P = \frac{1470 \ \text{kPa} \cdot \mu \text{m}}{P_L}$$

As pressure increases, so does the cumulative pore volume. From the cumulative pore volume, one can find the pressure and pore diameter where 50% of the total volume has been added to give the median pore diameter.

== See also ==
- BET theory, measurement of specific surface
- Evapoporometry
- Porosity
- Wood's metal, also injected for pore structure impregnation and replica
