= Pervaporation =

Industrial liquid purification method

Pervaporation (or pervaporative separation) is a processing method for the separation of mixtures of liquids by partial vaporization through a non-porous or porous membrane.

== Theory ==
The term pervaporation is a portmanteau of the two steps of the process: (a) permeation through the membrane by the permeate, then (b) its evaporation into the vapor phase. This process is used by a number of industries for several different processes, including purification and analysis, due to its simplicity and in-line nature.

The membrane acts as a selective barrier between the two phases: the liquid-phase feed and the vapor-phase permeate. It allows the desired components of the liquid feed to transfer through it by vaporization. Separation of components is based on a difference in transport rate of individual components through the membrane.

Typically, the upstream side of the membrane is at ambient pressure and the downstream side is under vacuum to allow the evaporation of the selective component after permeation through the membrane. Driving force for the separation is the difference in the partial pressures of the components on the two sides and not the volatility difference of the components in the feed.

The driving force for transport of different components is provided by a chemical potential difference between the liquid feed/retentate and vapor permeate at each side of the membrane. The retentate is the remainder of the feed leaving the membrane feed chamber, which is not permeated through the membrane. The chemical potential can be expressed in terms of fugacity, given by Raoult's law for a liquid and by Dalton's law for (an ideal) gas. During operation, due to removal of the vapor-phase permeate, the actual fugacity of the vapor is lower than anticipated on basis of the collected (condensed) permeate.

Separation of components (e.g. water and ethanol) is based on a difference in transport rate of individual components through the membrane. This transport mechanism can be described using the solution-diffusion model, based on the rate/degree of dissolution of a component into the membrane and its velocity of transport (expressed in terms of diffusivity) through the membrane, which will be different for each component and membrane type leading to separation.

== Applications ==
Pervaporation is effective for dilute solutions containing trace or minor amounts of the component to be removed. Based on this, hydrophilic membranes are used for dehydration of alcohols containing small amounts of water and hydrophobic membranes are used for removal/recovery of trace amounts of organics from aqueous solutions.

Pervaporation is an efficient energy conserving alternative to processes such as distillation and evaporation. It allows the exchange of two phases without direct contact.

Examples include solvent dehydration: dehydrating the ethanol/water and isopropanol/water azeotropes, continuous ethanol removal from yeast fermentors, continuous water removal from condensation reactions such as esterifications to enhance conversion and rate of the reaction, membrane introduction mass spectrometry, removing organic solvents from industrial waste waters, combination of distillation and pervaporation/vapour permeation, and concentration of hydrophobic flavour compounds in aqueous solutions (using hydrophobic membranes).

Recently, a number of organophilic pervaporation membranes have been introduced to the market. Organophilic pervaporation membranes can be used for the separation of organic-organic mixtures, e.g.: reduction of the aromatics content in refinery streams, breaking of azeotropes, purification of extraction media, purification of product stream after extraction, and purification of organic solvents.

== Materials ==
Hydrophobic membranes are often polydimethylsiloxane based where the actual separation mechanism is based on the solution-diffusion model described above.

Hydrophilic membranes are more widely available. The commercially most successful pervaporation membrane system to date is based on polyvinyl alcohol. More recently also membranes based on polyimide have become available. To overcome the intrinsic disadvantages of polymeric membrane systems ceramic membranes have been developed over the last decade. These ceramic membranes consist of nanoporous layers on top of a macroporous support. The pores must be large enough to let water molecules pass through and retain any other solvents that have a larger molecular size such as ethanol. As a result, a molecular sieve with a pore size of about 4 Å is obtained. The most widely available member of this class of membranes is that based on zeolite A.

Alternatively to these crystalline materials, the porous structure of amorphous silica layers can be tailored towards molecular selectivity. These membranes are fabricated by sol-gel chemical processes. Research into novel hydrophilic ceramic membranes has been focused on titania or zirconia. Very recently a break-through in hydrothermal stability has been achieved through the development of an organic-inorganic hybrid material.

== See also ==
- Mass transfer
