= Pressure-retarded osmosis =

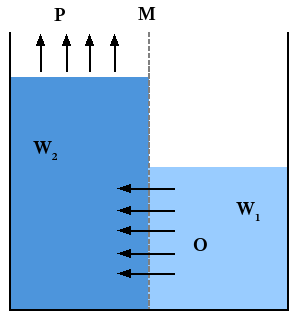
The ideal water potential between fresh water (right) and sea water (left) corresponds to a hydraulic head of 270 metres

Pressure-retarded osmosis (PRO) is a technique to separate a solvent (for example, fresh water) from a solution that is more concentrated (e.g. sea water) and also pressurized. A semipermeable membrane allows the solvent to pass to the concentrated solution side by osmosis. The technique can be used to generate power from the salinity gradient energy resulting from the difference in the salt concentration between sea and river water.

== History ==
A pressure-retarded osmosis apparatus was described by Maxwell and Weingarten in US Patent 3,587,227 (filed June 1969, issued June 1971). Their invention describes the use of a selective membrane to drive pressurization of a working fluid, including both batch configurations and a reciprocating pair of pistons that can provide continuous power.

Weingartens' osmotic pressurization of a cylinder

Weingartens' reciprocating cylinders for continuous generation of osmotic power

They also disclosed the use of aqueous salt solutions as the osmotic solution.

Another version of PRO power generation was patented by Loeb in 1973.

Norman submitted a manuscript describing the concept to Science in May 1974. In that manuscript, Norman clearly indicated that he was unaware of any prior art. Loeb submitted a comment on Norman's cost analysis in January 1975, in which he proposed the term "pressure-retarded osmosis".

Statkraft opened the world's first osmotic plant with capacity of 10 kW, on 24 November 2009 in Tofte, Norway. It had been estimated that PRO could generate 12 TWh annually in Norway, sufficient to meet 10% of Norway's electricity demand.

In January 2014, Statkraft terminated their pilot project due to economic feasibility concerns.

Starting in 2021, SaltPower was building another commercial osmotic power plant in Denmark using brine from a geothermal power plant.

In 2025 Japan's National Institute for Materials Science and local partners built a PRO plant to generate around 880,000 kilowatt-hours per year – enough to power a desalination plant. The plant pairs the desalination plant with a wastewater treatment system.

== Background ==
The ideal power production formula, which applies to an idealized device, predicts that the optimal hydraulic pressure difference, $\Delta P$ is one-half the osmotic pressure difference between the saline and pure streams $\Delta \Pi/2$. For a seawater to fresh water system, the optimal power pressure is 26 bar. This pressure is equivalent to a 270 meter water column (hydraulic head).

== Process ==
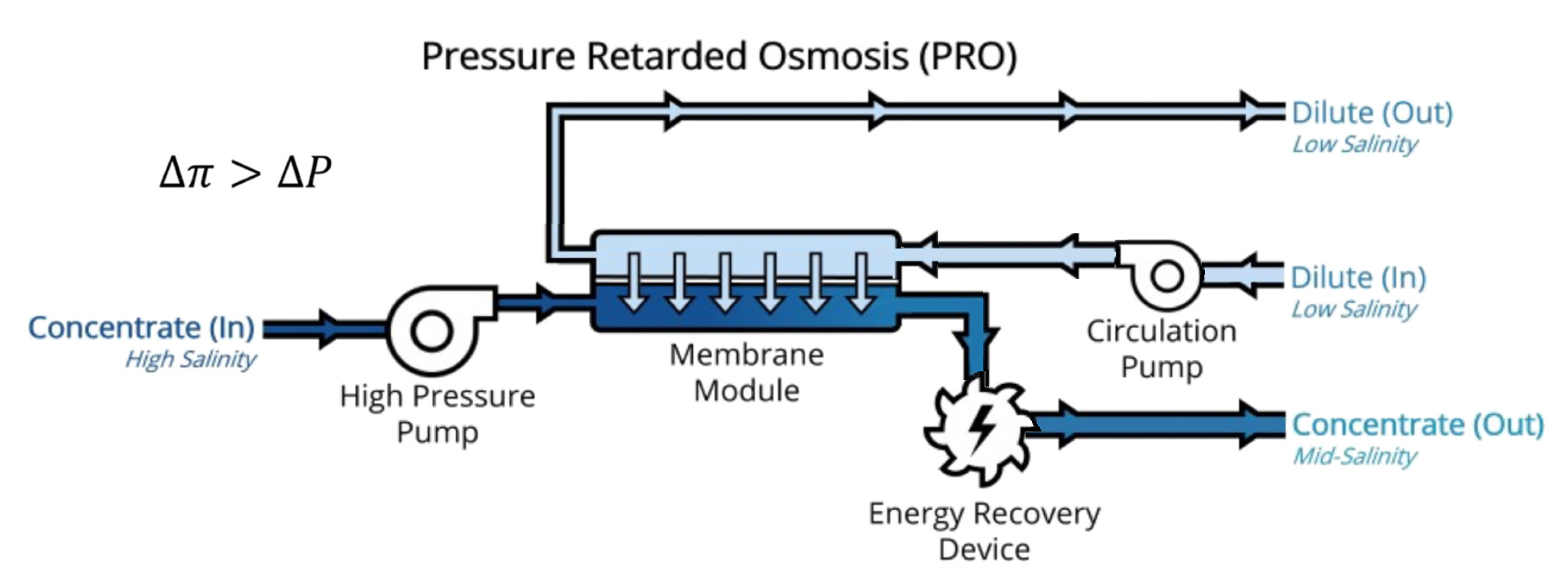
A pressure-retarded osmosis (PRO) diagram. The applied pressure must be below the osmotic pressure for the process to work. Pipe thicknesses qualitatively convey the relative volumetric flow rate. Image modified by author from

PRO uses a water–permeable membrane with an osmotic pressure difference to drive water flux from a low–concentration "diluate" stream, into a slightly pressurized higher–concentration. An energy recovery device on this stream provides the energy output, and must exceed the pumping pressure input for net power production.

In a real-world system, both the hydraulic pressure and the osmotic pressure vary through the PRO system as a result of friction, water removal, and salt accumulation near the membranes. These factors reduce the achievable power below the ideal. The amount of membrane area that can be used is limited by cost and other practical considerations, which limits power production. The circulating pumps consume a significant portion of the generated power. This power demand can be reduced with designs that use pressure exchangers. Appropriate membranes are essential. A main consideration governing PRO performance is the degree of concentration polarization within the membrane, which is characterized in PRO by the "structural parameter" $S$. Lower values of $S$ indicate less concentration within the membrane, improving performance. The membrane's water and salt permeance also influences performance.

These factors have limited PRO's economic viability. Although it can make seawater desalination modestly less energy intensive, PRO requires high amounts of electrical energy to be economical. PRO may be more competitive in regions where electricity prices vary dramatically, where reverse osmosis systems could be operated in PRO mode during price spikes.

PRO has the potential to extract osmotic power from waste streams, such as desalination plant brine discharge or treated wastewater effluent. The potential power output is proportional to the salinity difference between the streams. Desalination yields very salty brine, while treated municipal wastewater has relatively little salt. Combining those streams could power both facilities. However, powering an existing wastewater treatment plant by mixing treated wastewater with seawater in a mid-size city could require a membrane area of 2.5 square kilometers.

== See also ==
- Electrodialysis reversal (EDR)
- Forward osmosis
- Green energy
- Osmotic power
- Osmotic pressure
- Renewable energy
- Reverse electrodialysis (RED)
- Reverse osmosis
- Semipermeable membrane
- Van 't Hoff factor
