= Reversed electrodialysis =

Reverse electrodialysis (RED) is the salinity gradient energy retrieved from the difference in the salt concentration between seawater and river water. A method of utilizing the energy produced by this process by means of a heat engine was invented by Prof. Sidney Loeb in 1977 at the Ben-Gurion University of the Negev. --United States Patent US4171409

In reverse electrodialysis a salt solution and fresh water are let through a stack of alternating cation and anion exchange membranes. The chemical potential difference between salt and fresh water generates a voltage over each membrane and the total potential of the system is the sum of the potential differences over all membranes. The process works through difference in ion concentration instead of an electric field, which has implications for the type of membrane needed.

In RED, as in a fuel cell, the cells are stacked. A module with a capacity of 250 kW has the size of a shipping container.

In the Netherlands, for example, more than 3,300 m^{3} fresh water runs into the sea per second on average. The membrane halves the pressure differences which results in a water column of approximately 135 meters. The energy potential is therefore e=mgΔh=3.3*10^{6} kg/s*10 m/s^{2}*135 meters ca.= 4.5*10^{9} Joule per second, Power=4.5 gigawatts.

== Development ==
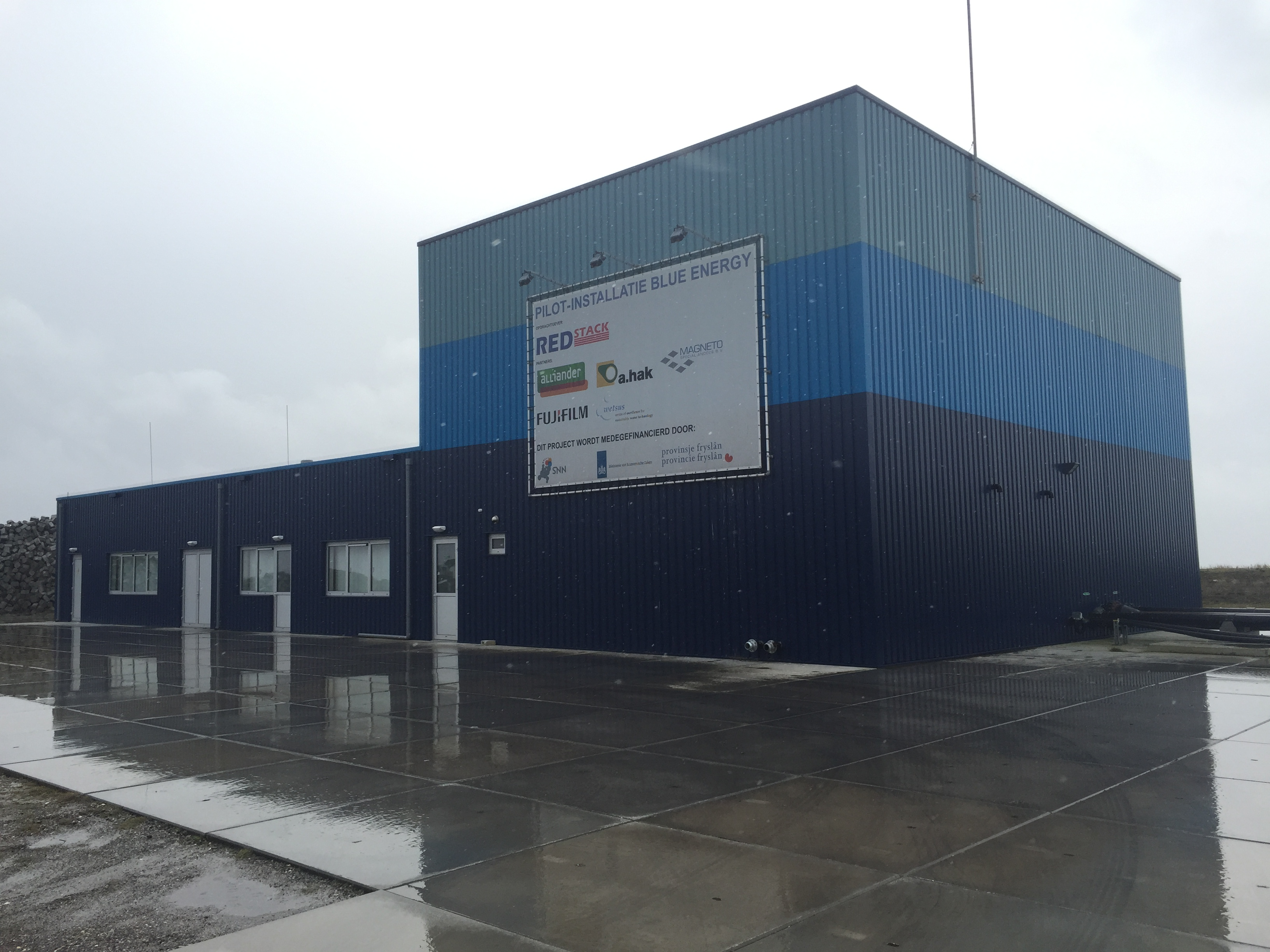
RED-prototype of REDstack at the Afsluitdijk in The Netherlands

In 2006 a 50 kW plant was located at a coastal test site in Harlingen, the Netherlands, the focus being on prevention of biofouling of the anode, cathode, and membranes and increasing the membrane performance. In 2007 the Directorate for Public Works and Water Management, Redstack, and ENECO signed a declaration of intent for development of a pilot plant on the Afsluitdijk in the Netherlands. The plant was put into service on 26 November 2014 and produces 50 kW of electricity to show the technical feasibility in real-life conditions using fresh IJsselmeer water and salt water from the Wadden Sea. Theoretically, with 1m^{3}/s river water and an equal amount of sea water, approximately 1 MW of renewable electricity can be recovered at this location by upscaling the plant. It is to be expected that after this phase the installation could be further expanded to a final capacity of 200 MW.

The main disadvantage of reverse electrodialysis electricity production is the high capital costs involved. Ion exchange membranes are very expensive and power produced per membrane area is really low. As consequence, return of investment is much lower than other renewable energy sources such as wind or solar.

== See also ==
- Osmotic power
- Van 't Hoff factor
- Pressure-retarded osmosis (PRO)
- Electrodialysis reversal (EDR)
- Reverse osmosis
- Semipermeable membrane
- Green energy
- Renewable energy
