= Statkraft osmotic power prototype in Hurum =

Osmotic power plant in Norway

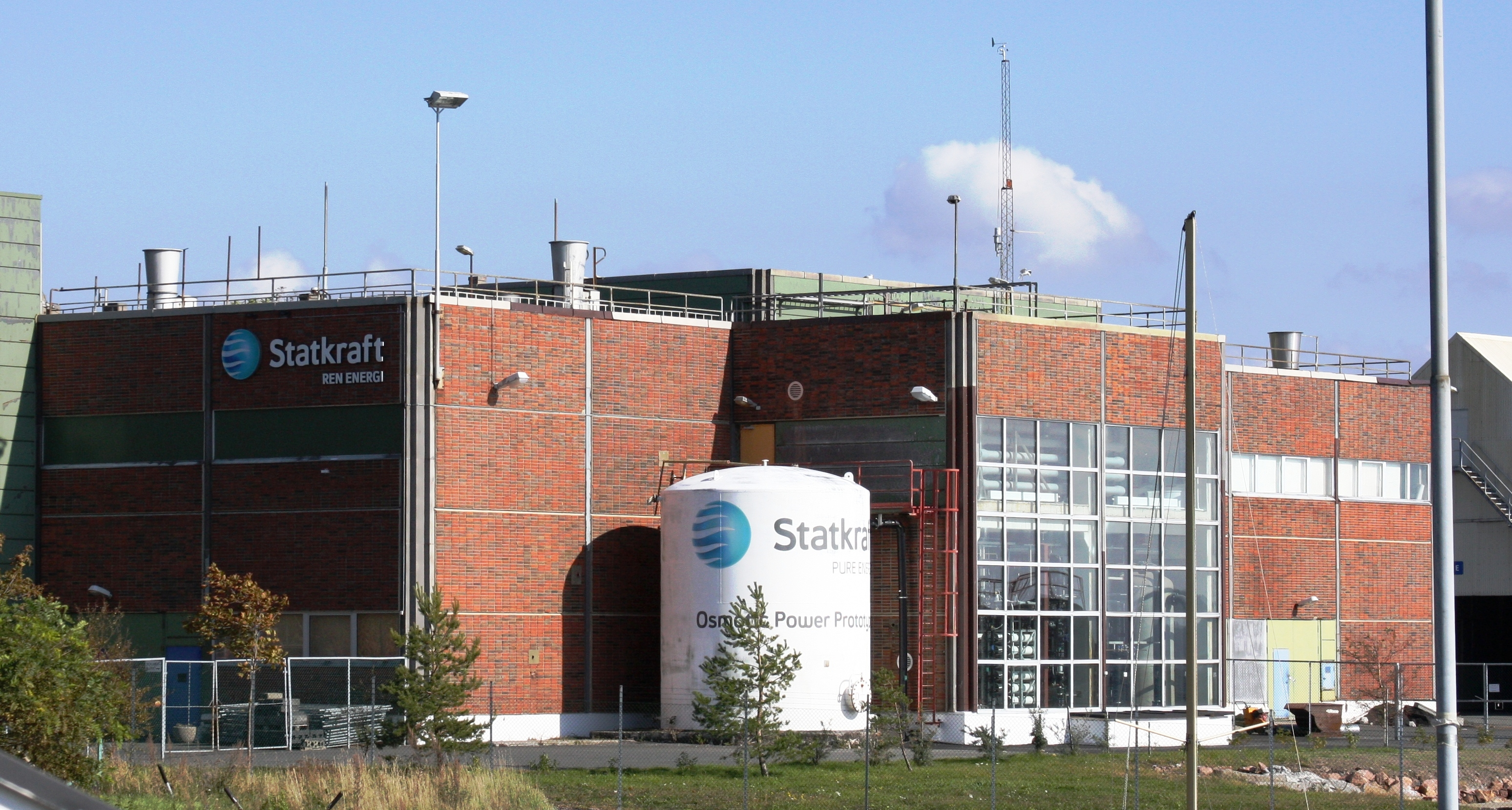
- Country: Norway
- Location: Tofte
- Coordinates: 59°33′N 10°34′E
- Status: Operational
- Commission date: 2009

External links
- Commons: Related media on Commons

Statkraft osmotic power prototype is the world's first osmotic power plant, based on the energy of osmosis. The power plant is run by Statkraft. The power plant is located at Tofte in Hurum, Norway, with rooms at the factory area at Södra Cell Tofte cellulose factory. The power plant uses the osmotic gradient that occurs when fresh water and salt water meet, separated by a permeable membrane. The salt water pulls fresh water through the membrane and the pressure increases on the salt water side; this pressure increase can be used to produce electrical power with the use of a normal hydroelectric turbine/generator setup.

The plant is a prototype developed together with Sintef and began test power production on 24 November 2009. Mette-Marit, Crown Princess of Norway, officially opened the plant. This plant had been planned since the summer of 2008, with a water usage of 10 litres of fresh water and 20 litres of salt water per second. It is expected to give a power output of between 2-4 kW. With better membranes it is assumed that the power for a similar plant can be increased to about 10 kW. A commercial plant was expected to be built between 2012 and 2015.

In 2013, Statkraft announced that is discontinuing its work to develop osmotic power technology. The larger planned pilot facility, and the future commercial plant, will not be built.

== Advantages ==
This type of power generation is very reliable, consisting of only slightly more moving parts than a conventional hydroelectric power plant; in this case the addition of a pair of small pumps to move the fresh and salt water to the membrane surfaces. It is very quiet when operating and requires minimal supervision. In addition, it is expected the plant could respond very quickly as an emergency power source, using the membranes to 'store' power ready in the form of high pressure water; this water could be very quickly fed to the hydroelectric turbine to generate electricity. The expected lifetime of this plant is large; with almost no moving parts (those that do move are very simple and reliable), there will be little wear occurring. The availability of spare parts and upgrade components is also good, meaning that an installed osmotic power plant could be run for many years cost-effectively.

== Disadvantages ==
Whilst highly reliable, simple and cheap to run/maintain, this plant is very expensive to install. The permeable membrane is currently an expensive resource, and to have any meaningful output, a very large membrane area is required. The plant described in this article could reach a power output of 4 kW in ideal conditions. By comparison, an open cycle gas turbine a fraction of the size (such as the Rolls-Royce or GE aero-derivative gas turbines) could easily produce greater than 15MW for a fraction of the installation costs, although fuel and maintenance costs would be greater. This is an increase in power output 3750 times greater, with a land usage that is much smaller. Comparing the ideal power output of this plant to the rough average household consumption of a modern home detailed in the article domestic energy consumption, it can be seen that this is a very limited technology - working back the figures, it equates that the average home requires 2 kW of power. Bear in mind however that advances in materials technology will likely greatly increase the power output per plant volume over time and thus make this a more useful form of power generation, particularly in remote locations where reliability is key and spare parts are difficult to come by (e.g. difficult-to-access coastal locations with a small stream or river nearby that can provide the fresh water required).
