= Richard Stover =

American businessman and engineer

Richard Lindsay Stover (born 1962) is an American engineer who developed the PX Pressure Exchanger device for energy recovery. It is used in modern seawater reverse osmosis desalination plants.

== Early life and education ==
Richard Stover studied chemical engineering at the University of Texas at Austin from 1983 through 1986, graduating with a bachelor's degree. He continued the study of chemical engineering at the University of California at Berkeley starting in 1991, completing a Ph.D. in 1996. His dissertation was entitled "Bubble Dynamics in Electrolytic Gas Evolution” (Electrochemical Engineering) with Charles Tobias and Morton Denn. As part of his work he devised an optical-laser technique to record fluid dynamics during hydrolysis and experimented with surface tension, viscosity, electrode polarity, and bubble size. He simulated experiments with a finite-difference fluid-flow model.

== Career ==
Stover worked for the 3M Company in Minnesota from 1986 through 1990 as a process and chemical engineer. He was responsible for product delivery, reliability, and cost at a videotape manufacturing facility. He worked for the IBM Corporation in San Jose from 1996 through 1998 as a process development engineer. There he led a manufacturing engineering team in developing and implementing a process for reducing friction and contamination in advanced computer hard drives. He discovered, demonstrated, and patented a hard-drive component design feature to increase product reliability.. He then worked for LFR Levine Fricke in Emeryville California 1998 through 2002 as a chemical engineering and environmental consultant. In this capacity, he designed and implemented wastewater treatment plants using chemical, electrolytic or membrane separation processes.

Stover joined Energy Recovery Inc.(ERI) in 2002 to develop and launch the PX-220, which has since become the leading energy recovery device in seawater desalination. His numerous publications and achievements have earned him international recognition as an expert in energy recovery and process optimization in reverse osmosis systems. At ERI, he holds responsibility for technical product-support services, strategic positioning of PX technology, and managing and expanding ERI's intellectual property holdings. In addition, in his current role as Vice President of Sales, he is responsible for strategic growth and risk management. Stover was a co-recipient of the European Desalination Society's 2006 Sidney Loeb award for outstanding innovation.

As Desalitech's Executive Vice President since 2010, he has been responsible for market strategy, customer and technical support and growth of the company's leadership role in high efficiency water treatment. Since joining Desalitech, Dr. Stover has assisted in the launch of Desalitech's ReFlex Reverse Osmosis systems which features patented CCD technology – the first major improvement in the reverse osmosis process in decades. ReFlex systems typically reduce brine waste by 50 to 75 percent and energy consumption by 35 percent while providing increased reliability and flexibility.

== Project involvement ==
Stover pioneered the development of the PX Pressure Exchanger energy recovery device which improved seawater desalination by reducing the amount of energy required by the reverse osmosis process. The PX Pressure Exchanger device represents a notable contribution to Clean Technology.

== Notable activities and other participations ==
- Energy Recovery Devices in Desalination Applications, Proceedings of the International Water Association’s 2008 North American Membrane Research Conference, University of Massachusetts, Amherst Massachusetts, August 2008.: Stover presented about Energy recovery devices in desalination applications.
- Energy Recovery Devices in Membrane Desalination Operations (with Borja Blanco), Proceedings of the WIM2008 International Congress on Water Management in the Mining Industry, July 2008.: oral and poster presentation with Borja Blanco about "Membrane Processes - Desalinisation - Reverse Osmosis".
- Low Energy Consumption SWRO, submitted to Proceedings of Clean Technology 2008, Boston Massachusetts, June 2008.: article that describes the design and operation of the Perth plant as a new standard for seawater desalination.
- Environmentally Sound Desalination at the Perth Seawater Desalination Plant, Proceedings of the Enviro '08, Australia’s Environmental and Sustainability Conference and Exhibition, Melbourne, Australia, May 2008.: conference talk about "Energy Solutions in the Water Industry – The Perth Seawater Desalination Plant".
- Seawater Reverse Osmosis Process Simulator, Desalination, Volume 221 Numbers 1, pp. 126–135, March 2008.: article about an original SWRO process simulator.
- Seawater Reverse Osmosis with Isobaric Energy Recovery Devices, Desalination 203, pp. 168–175, February 2007.: article about principles and theories of energy recovery devices.
- Rotary Pressure Exchanger, US Patent 7,201,557, Patent and Trademark Office, Washington, D.C., April 10, 2007.: patent awarded for improvements on rotary Pressure Exchanger devices.
- Osmotic Power from the Ocean (with G.G. Pique), Power Magazine, December 2006.: demonstration test of osmotic power generation using the osmotic potential difference between seawater and fresh water.
- The Ghalilah SWRO plant: an overview of the solutions adopted to minimize energy consumption (with A. Ameglio and P.A.K. Khan), Desalination, 184 (1), p. 217-221, Nov 2005.: article that described the challenges and solutions associated with the design, commissioning and operation of the Federal Electricity and Water Authorities (FEWA) SWRO plant, particularly those aspects associated with energy efficiency and energy recovery.
- Development of a Fourth Generation Energy Recovery Device – A CTO’s Notebook, Desalination, 165, pp. 313–321, August 2004.: article about the challenges and solutions of the design and deployment of the PX energy recovery device.
- Report of the Berkeley Plastics Task Force (with K. Evans and K. Pickett), Ecology Center Press, 1996.: member of the task force that conducted research about plastic manufacturing, the recyclability of various types of plastic packaging, the feasibility of picking up plastics in a curbside recycling program, and issues surrounding plastics in the waste stream.
