= Exchanger =

Exchanger may refer to:

- Exchanger (protein), an integral membrane protein involved in active transport
- Digital currency exchanger, a market maker which exchanges fiat currency for electronic money
- Heat exchanger, a device built for efficient heat transfer from one medium to another
- Pressure exchanger, a device that transfers pressure energy from a high pressure fluid stream to a low pressure fluid stream

== See also ==
- Exchange (disambiguation)
