= Thin-film composite membrane =

Membrane used for water purification

Thin-film composite membranes (TFC or TFM) are semipermeable membranes manufactured to provide selectivity with high permeability. Most TFC's are used in water purification or water desalination systems. They also have use in chemical applications such as gas separations, dehumidification, batteries and fuel cells. A TFC membrane can be considered a molecular sieve constructed in the form of a film from two or more layered materials. The additional layers provide structural strength and a low-defect surface to support a selective layer that is thin enough to be selective but not so thick that it causes low permeability.

TFC membranes for water treatment are commonly classified as nanofiltration (NF) and reverse osmosis (RO) membranes. Both types are typically made out of a thin polyamide layer (<200 nm) deposited on top of a polyethersulfone or polysulfone porous layer (about 50 microns) on top of a non-woven fabric support sheet. The three layer configuration gives the desired properties of high rejection of undesired materials (like salts), high filtration rate, and good mechanical strength. The polyamide top layer is responsible for the high rejection and is chosen primarily for its permeability to water and relative impermeability to various dissolved impurities including salt ions and other small, unfilterable molecules. Although not fully commercialized yet, TFC's are also used in other water treatment technologies, including Forward osmosis, membrane distillation, and electrodialysis.

== History ==
The first viable reverse osmosis membrane was made from cellulose acetate as an integrally skinned asymmetric semi-permeable membrane. This membrane was made by Loeb and Sourirajan at UCLA in 1959 and patented in 1960. In 1972, John Cadotte of North Star Technologies (later FilmTec Corporation) developed the first interfacial polyamide (IP) thin-film-composite (TFC) membrane. The current generation of reverse osmosis (RO) membrane materials are based on a composite material patented by FilmTec Corporation in 1970 (now part of DuPont). Today, most such membranes for reverse osmosis and nanofiltration use a Polyamide active layer.

== Structure and materials ==
As is suggested by the name, TFC membranes are composed of multiple layers. Membranes designed for desalination use an active thin-film layer of polyamide layered with polysulfone as a porous support layer. The active layers tend to be extremely thin and relatively nonporous. The chemistry of these layers often imparts selectivity. Meanwhile the support layers tend to need to be both extremely porous and robust to higher pressures.

Other materials, usually zeolites, are also used in the manufacture of TFC membranes.

== Applications ==
Thin film composite membranes are used in

- Water purification
- In RO Plant;
- as a chemical reaction buffer (batteries and fuel cells);
- in industrial gas separations.

== Limitations ==
Thin film composites membranes typically suffer from compaction effects under pressure. As the water pressure increases, the polymers are slightly reorganized into a tighter fitting structure that results in a lower porosity, ultimately limiting the efficiency of the system designed to use them. In general, the higher the pressure, the greater the compaction.

Surface fouling: Colloidal particulates, bacteria infestation (biofouling).

Chemical decomposition and oxidation.

== Performance ==
A filtration membrane's performance is rated by selectivity, chemical resistance, operational pressure differential and the pure water flow rate per unit area.

Due to the importance of throughput, a membrane is manufactured as thinly as possible. These thin layers introduce defects that may affect selectivity, so system design usually trades off the desired throughput against both selectivity and operational pressure.

In applications other than filtration, parameters such as mechanical strength, temperature stability, and electrical conductivity may dominate.

== Active research areas ==
Nano-composite membranes (TFN). Key points: multiple layers, multiple materials.

Mitigation of membrane fouling

New materials, synthetic zeolites, etc. to obtain higher performance.

NanoH2O Inc. commercialized a membrane in which zeolite nanoparticles were synthesized and embedded within an RO membrane to form a thin-film nanocomposite, or TFN, which has proven to be more than 50-100% more permeable compared to conventional RO membranes while maintaining the same level of salt rejection.

Fuel-cells.

Batteries.

== See also ==
- Maxwell–Stefan diffusion
- Reverse Osmosis
- Nanofiltration
