= Osmotic power =

Sustainable energy from sea and river water

Osmotic power, salinity gradient power or blue energy is the energy available from the difference in the salt concentration between seawater and river water. Two practical methods for this are reverse electrodialysis (RED) and pressure retarded osmosis (PRO). Both processes rely on osmosis with membranes. The key waste product is brackish water. This byproduct is the result of natural forces that are being harnessed: the flow of fresh water into seas that are made up of salt water.

In 1954, Pattle suggested that there was an untapped source of power when a river mixes with the sea, in terms of the lost osmotic pressure, however it was not until the mid-1970s when a practical method of harnessing it using selectively permeable membranes by Loeb was outlined.

The method of generating power by pressure retarded osmosis was invented by Sidney Loeb in 1973 at the Ben-Gurion University of the Negev, Beersheba, Israel. The idea came to Loeb, in part, as he observed the Jordan River flowing into the Dead Sea. He wanted to harvest the energy of mixing of the two aqueous solutions (the Jordan River being one and the Dead Sea being the other) that was going to waste in this natural mixing process. In 1977, Loeb invented a method of producing power by a reverse electrodialysis heat engine.

The technologies have been confirmed in laboratory conditions. They are being developed for commercial use in the Netherlands (RED), Denmark and Japan (PRO). PRO operated in Norway between 20009 - 2014. The cost of the membrane was an obstacle. A new, lower cost membrane, based on an electrically modified polyethylene plastic, has made it fit for potential commercial use. Other methods have been proposed and are currently under development. Among them are a method based on electric double-layer capacitor technology and a method based on vapor pressure difference.

== Basics of salinity gradient power ==
Pressure-retarded osmosis

Salinity gradient power is a specific renewable energy alternative that creates renewable and sustainable power by using naturally occurring processes. This practice does not contaminate or release carbon dioxide (CO_{2}) emissions (vapor pressure methods will release dissolved air containing CO_{2} at low pressures—these non-condensable gases can be re-dissolved of course, but with an energy penalty). Also as stated by Jones and Finley within their article "Recent Development in Salinity Gradient Power", there is basically no fuel cost.

Salinity gradient energy is based on using the resources of "osmotic pressure difference between fresh water and sea water." All energy that is proposed to use salinity gradient technology relies on evaporation to separate water from salt. Osmotic pressure is the "chemical potential of concentrated and dilute solutions of salt". When looking at relations between high osmotic pressure and low, solutions with higher concentrations of salt have higher pressure.

Various salinity gradient power generations exist; one of the most commonly discussed is pressure-retarded osmosis (PRO). Within PRO seawater is pumped into a pressure chamber where the pressure is lower than the difference between fresh and salt water pressure. Fresh water moves in a semipermeable membrane and increases its volume in the chamber. As the pressure in the chamber is compensated a turbine spins to generate electricity. In Braun's article he states that this process is easy to understand in a more broken down manner. Two solutions, A being salt water and B being fresh water are separated by a membrane. He states "only water molecules can pass the semipermeable membrane. As a result of the osmotic pressure difference between both solutions, the water from solution B thus will diffuse through the membrane in order to dilute solution A". The pressure drives the turbines and power the generator that produces the electrical energy. Osmosis might be used directly to "pump" fresh water out of The Netherlands into the sea. This is currently done using electric pumps.

== Efficiency ==
A 2012 study on efficiency from Yale University concluded that the highest extractable work in constant-pressure PRO with a seawater draw solution and river water feed solution is 0.75 kWh/m^{3} (2.7 kJ/L) while the free energy of mixing is 0.81 kWh/m^{3} (2.9 kJ/L) — a thermodynamic extraction efficiency of 91.0%.

== Methods ==
While the mechanisms and concepts of salinity gradient power are still being studied, the power source has been implemented in several different locations. Most of these are experimental, but thus far they have been predominantly successful. The various companies that have utilized this power have also done so in many different ways as there are several concepts and processes that harness the power from salinity gradient.

=== Pressure-retarded osmosis ===
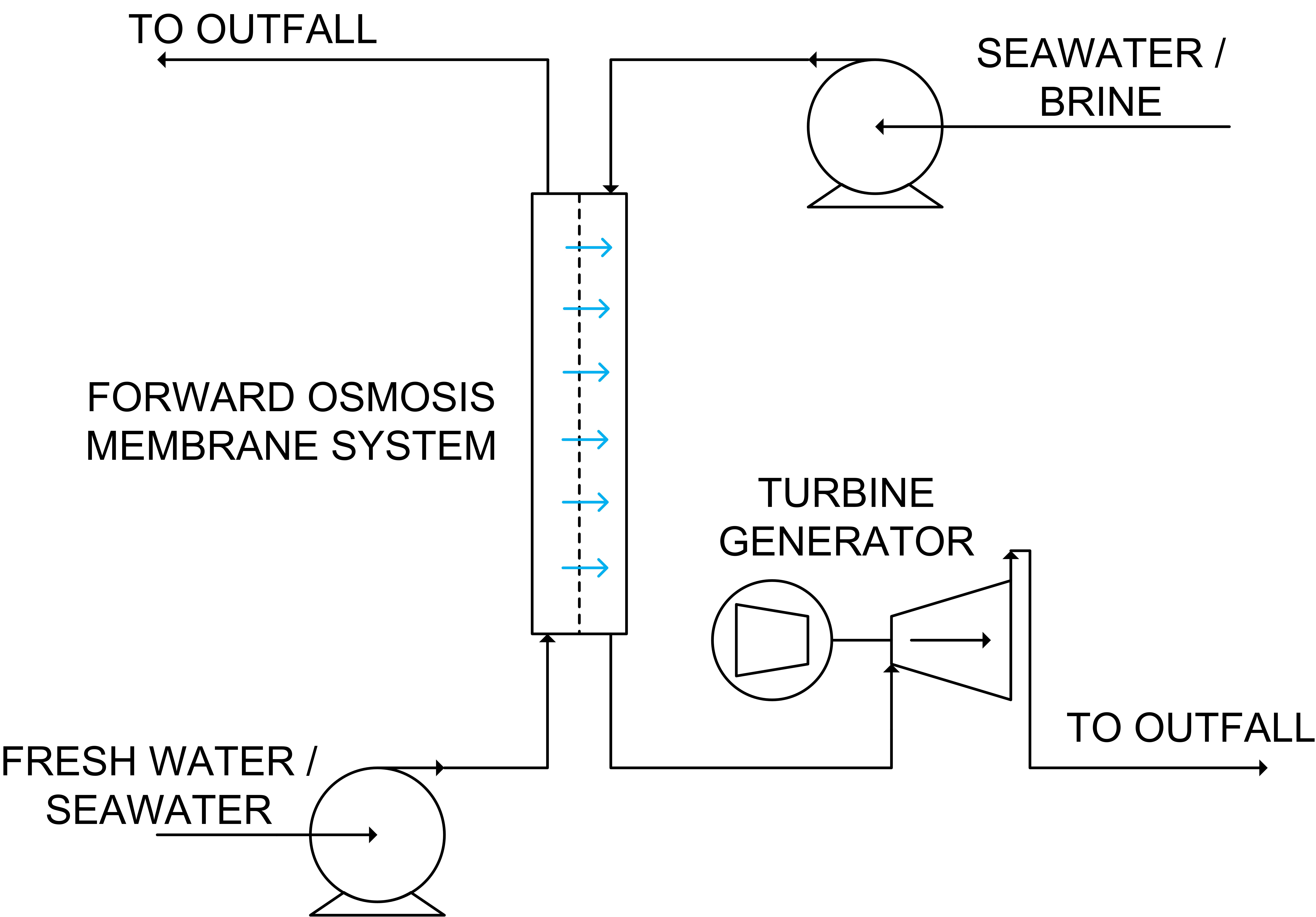
Simple PRO power generation scheme

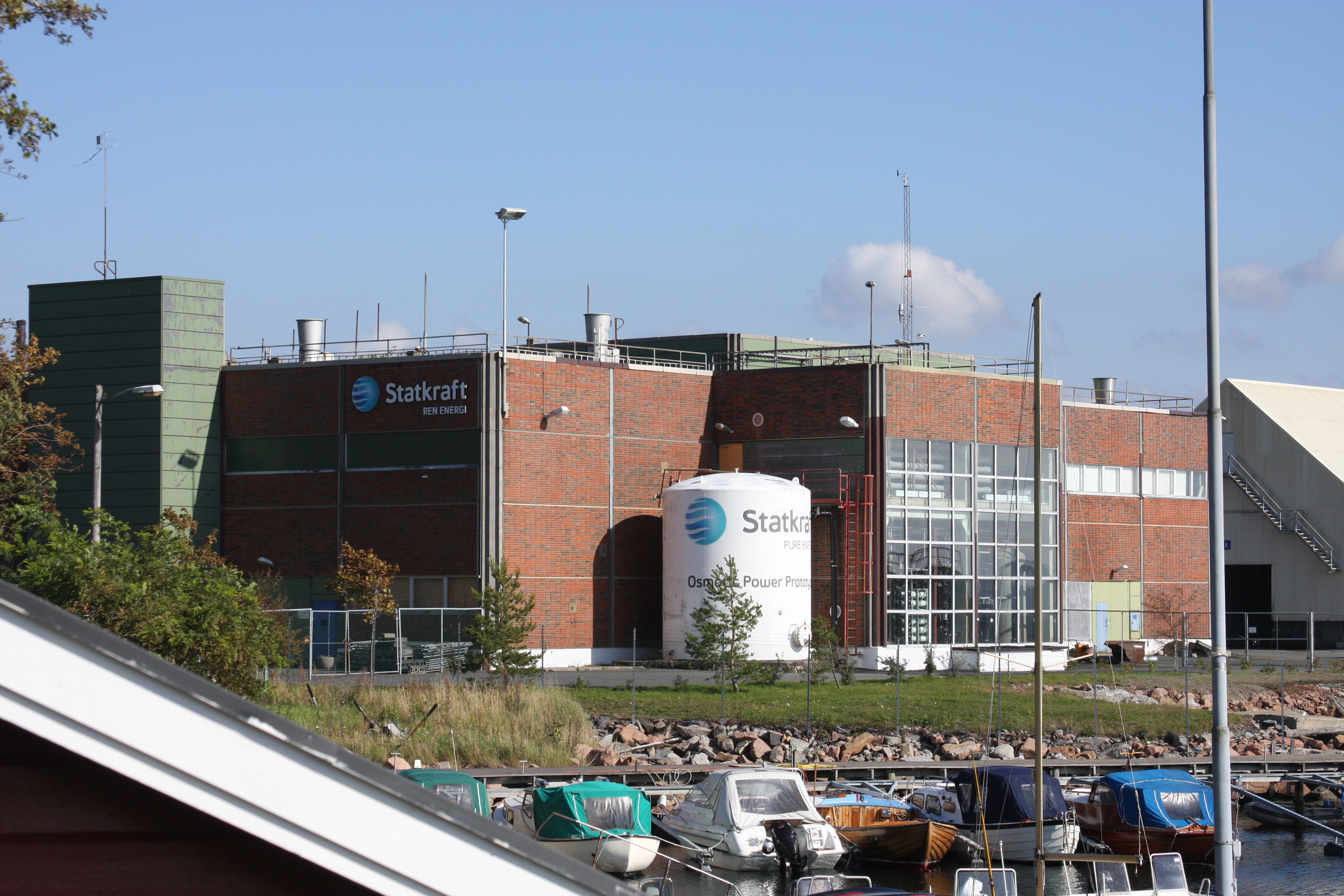
Osmotic Power Prototype at Tofte (Hurum), Norway

One method to utilize salinity gradient energy is called pressure-retarded osmosis. In this method, seawater is pumped into a pressure chamber that is at a pressure lower than the difference between the pressures of saline water and fresh water. Freshwater is also pumped into the pressure chamber through a membrane, which increase both the volume and pressure of the chamber. As the pressure differences are compensated, a turbine is spun, providing kinetic energy. This method was being specifically studied by the Norwegian utility Statkraft, which had estimated that up to 2.85 GW would be available from this process in Norway. Statkraft has the world's first prototype PRO power plant built on the Oslo fjord which was opened on November 24, 2009. It aimed to produce enough electricity to light and heat a small town within five years by osmosis. At first, it did produce a minuscule 4 kilowatts – enough to heat a large electric kettle, but the proposed objective for 2015 was to reach 25 megawatts – the same as a small wind farm. In January 2014 however Statkraft announced not to continue this pilot plant. Statkraft found that with existing technology, the salt gradient was not high enough to be economic, which other studies have confirmed. Higher salt gradients can be found in geothermal brines and desalination plant brines, and SaltPower, a Danish company, is now building its first commercial plant with high salinity brine. There is perhaps more potential in integrating Pressure Retarded Osmosis as an operating mode of reverse osmosis, rather than a stand-alone technology.

=== Reversed electrodialysis ===
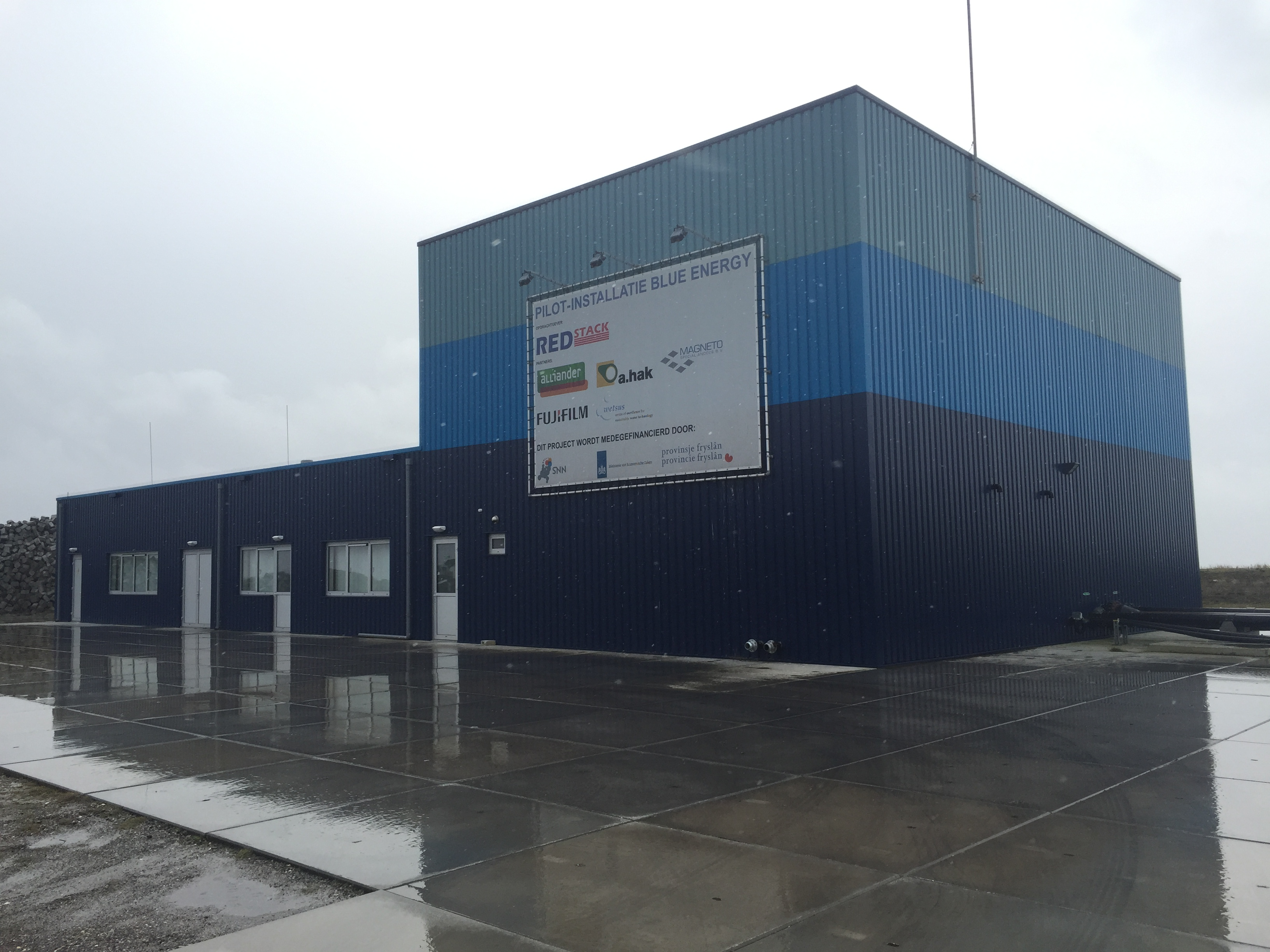
RED-prototype of REDstack at the Afsluitdijk in The Netherlands

A second method being developed and studied is reversed electrodialysis or reverse dialysis, which is essentially the creation of a salt battery. This method was described by Weinstein and Leitz as "an array of alternating anion and cation exchange membranes can be used to generate electric power from the free energy of river and sea water."

The technology related to this type of power is still in its infant stages, even though the principle was discovered in the 1950s. Standards and a complete understanding of all the ways salinity gradients can be utilized are important goals to strive for in order to make this clean energy source more viable in the future.

=== Capacitive method ===
A third method is Doriano Brogioli's capacitive method, which is relatively new and has so far only been tested on lab scale. With this method energy can be extracted out of the mixing of saline water and freshwater by cyclically charging up electrodes in contact with saline water, followed by a discharge in freshwater. Since the amount of electrical energy which is needed during the charging step is less than one gets out during the discharge step, each completed cycle effectively produces energy. An intuitive explanation of this effect is that the great number of ions in the saline water efficiently neutralizes the charge on each electrode by forming a thin layer of opposite charge very close to the electrode surface, known as an electric double layer. Therefore, the voltage over the electrodes remains low during the charge step and charging is relatively easy. In between the charge and discharge step, the electrodes are brought in contact with freshwater. After this, there are fewer ions available to neutralize the charge on each electrode such that the voltage over the electrodes increases. The discharge step which follows is therefore able to deliver a relatively high amount of energy. A physical explanation is that on an electrically charged capacitor, there is a mutually attractive electric force between the electric charge on the electrode, and the ionic charge in the liquid. In order to pull ions away from the charged electrode, osmotic pressure must do work. This work done increases the electrical potential energy in the capacitor. An electronic explanation is that capacitance is a function of ion density. By introducing a salinity gradient and allowing some of the ions to diffuse out of the capacitor, this reduces the capacitance, and so the voltage must increase, since the voltage equals the ratio of charge to capacitance.

=== Vapor pressure differences: open cycle and absorption refrigeration cycle (closed cycle) ===
Both of these methods do not rely on membranes, so filtration requirements are not as important as they are in the PRO & RED schemes.

==== Open cycle ====
Similar to the open cycle in ocean thermal energy conversion (OTEC). The disadvantage of this cycle is the cumbersome problem of a large diameter turbine (75 meters +) operating at below atmospheric pressure to extract the power between the water with less salinity & the water with greater salinity.

==== Absorption refrigeration cycle (closed cycle) ====
For the purpose of dehumidifying air, in a water-spray absorption refrigeration system, water vapor is dissolved into a deliquescent salt water mixture using osmotic power as an intermediary. The primary power source originates from a thermal difference, as part of a thermodynamic heat engine cycle.

=== Solar pond ===
At the Eddy Potash Mine in New Mexico, a technology called "salinity gradient solar pond" (SGSP) is being utilized to provide the energy needed by the mine. This method does not harness osmotic power, only solar power (see: solar pond). Sunlight reaching the bottom of the saltwater pond is absorbed as heat. The effect of natural convection, wherein "heat rises", is blocked using density differences between the three layers that make up the pond, in order to trap heat. The upper convection zone is the uppermost zone, followed by the stable gradient zone, then the bottom thermal zone. The stable gradient zone is the most important. The saltwater in this layer can not rise to the higher zone because the saltwater above has lower salinity and is therefore less-dense and more buoyant; and it can not sink to the lower level because that saltwater is denser. This middle zone, the stable gradient zone, effectively becomes an "insulator" for the bottom layer (although the main purpose is to block natural convection, since water is a poor insulator). This water from the lower layer, the storage zone, is pumped out and the heat is used to produce energy, usually by turbine in an organic Rankine cycle.

In theory a solar pond could be used to generate osmotic power if evaporation from solar heat is used to create a salinity gradient, and the potential energy in this salinity gradient is harnessed directly using one of the first three methods above, such as the capacitive method.

=== Boron nitride nanotubes ===
A research team built an experimental system using boron nitride that produced much greater power than the Statkraft prototype. It used an impermeable and electrically insulating membrane that was pierced by a single boron nitride nanotube with an external diameter of a few dozen nanometers. With this membrane separating a salt water reservoir and a fresh water reservoir, the team measured the electric current passing through the membrane using two electrodes immersed in the fluid either side of the nanotube.

The results showed the device was able to generate an electric current on the order of a nanoampere. The researchers claim this is 1,000 times the yield of other known techniques for harvesting osmotic energy and makes boron nitride nanotubes an extremely efficient solution for harvesting the energy of salinity gradients for usable electrical power.

The team claimed that a 1 square metre (11 sq ft) membrane could generate around 4 kW and be capable of generating up to 30 MWh per year.

At the 2019 fall meeting of the Materials Research Society a team from Rutgers University reported creating a membrane that contained around 10 million BNNTs per cubic centimeter.

=== Using low caloric waste energy by regenerate a high solution ammonium bicarbonate in a solution with a low salinity ===
At Pennsylvania State University, Dr. Logan tries to use waste heat with low calority using the fact that ammonium bicarbonate decomposes into NH_{3} and CO_{2} in warm water to form ammonium bicarbonate again in cold water. So in a RED energy producing closed system the two different gradients of salinity are kept.

== Possible negative environmental impact ==
Marine and river environments have obvious differences in water quality, namely salinity. Each species of aquatic plant and animal is adapted to survive in either marine, brackish, or freshwater environments. There are species that can tolerate both, but these species usually thrive best in a specific water environment. The main waste product of salinity gradient technology is brackish water. The discharge of brackish water into the surrounding waters, if done in large quantities and with any regularity, will cause salinity fluctuations. While some variation in salinity is usual, particularly where fresh water (rivers) empties into an ocean or sea anyway, these variations become less important for both bodies of water with the addition of brackish waste waters. Extreme salinity changes in an aquatic environment may result in findings of low densities of both animals and plants due to intolerance of sudden severe salinity drops or spikes. According to the prevailing environmentalist opinions, the possibility of these negative effects should be considered by the operators of future large blue energy establishments.

The impact of brackish water on ecosystems can be minimized by pumping it out to sea and releasing it into the mid-layer, away from the surface and bottom ecosystems.

Impingement and entrainment at intake structures are a concern due to large volumes of both river and sea water utilized in both PRO and RED schemes. Intake construction permits must meet strict environmental regulations and desalination plants and power plants that utilize surface water are sometimes involved with various local, state and federal agencies to obtain permission that can take upwards to 18 months.

The Tethys database provides access to scientific literature and general information on the potential environmental effects of salinity gradient power.

== See also ==
- Forward osmosis – Water purification process
- Electrodialysis reversal (EDR) – Technique of separating salts from water
- Reversed electrodialysis
- Reverse osmosis – Water purification process
- Semipermeable membrane – Type of membrane
- Marine energy – Energy available from oceans
- Green energy – Energy that responsibly meets social, economic, and environmental needs
- Renewable energy – Energy collected from renewable resources
- Fugacity – Effective partial pressure
- Concentration cell – Galvanic cell
- Solar pond – Solar thermal energy
