= Södra Cell Tofte =

Norwegian pulp mill

Södra Cell Tofte AS
- Company type: Subsidiary
- Industry: Pulp and Paper Industry
- Founded: 1897
- Headquarters: Tofte, Norway
- Key people: Christen G. Hansen (Manager)
- Products: Pulp
- Revenue: NOK 2,133 million (2006)
- Operating income: -74 million (2006)
- Net income: -90 million (2006)
- Number of employees: 300 (2009)
- Parent: Södra
- Website: http://www.sodra.com

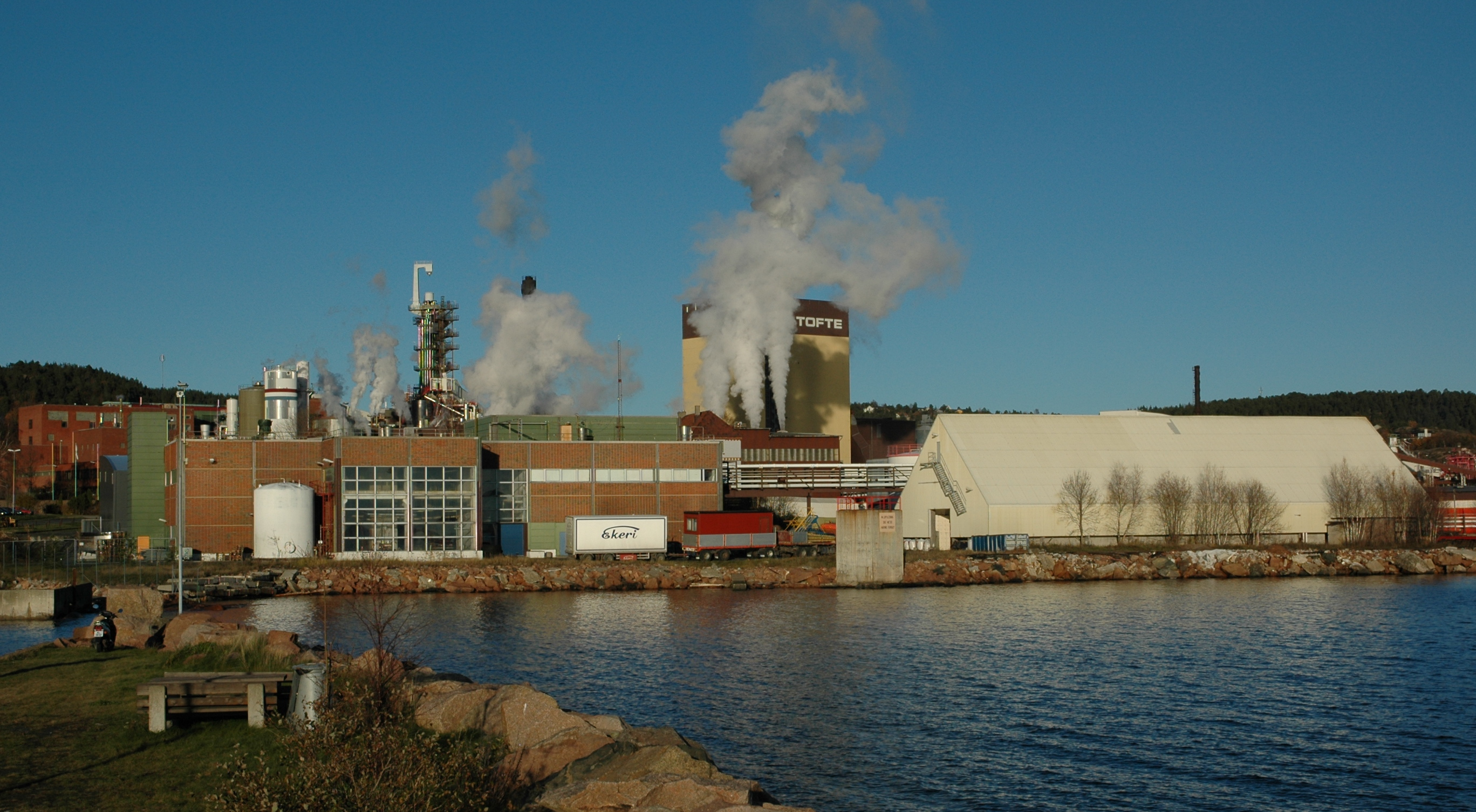
Södra Cell Tofte

Södra Cell Tofte is a pulp mill located at Tofte in Buskerud, Norway.

The plant dates back to 1897 when Tofte Cellulosefabrik was founded at the initiative of industrialist Anthon B. Nilsen. The raw material used at the plant is from eucalyptus, pine and spruce. The plant received about 25% of all Norwegian timber.

Tofte Industrier was formed in 1983 to operate the plant and produce chemical paper pulp. In 1989 Tofte Industrier was merged into Norske Skog. The plant was owned by the Swedish company Södra Skogsägarna from 2000 when it bought the plant and changed its name to Södra Cell Tofte.

In 2013, it was announced that the plant would be shut down due to lack of profit. In July 2013 it was announced that the decision to close the plant was definite after several attempts to sell it had failed. In May 2014, Statkraft and Södra Cell signed a letter of intent to form a company with the goal of establishing future biofuel production based on forest raw material. Under the agreement, Statkraft will acquire Södra Cell Tofte AS, which owns the industrial site of the former Tofte cellulose plant.
