= Silt density index =

Measure for the fouling capacity of water in reverse osmosis system

The silt density index is a measure for the fouling capacity of water in reverse osmosis systems. The test measures the rate at which a 0.45-micrometre filter is plugged when subjected to a constant water pressure of 206.8 kPa (30 psi). The SDI gives the percent drop per minute in the flow rate of the water through the filter, averaged over a period of time such as 15 minutes.

Typically, spiral-wound reverse osmosis systems will need an SDI less than 5, and hollow fiber reverse osmosis systems will need an SDI less than 3. In these kinds of systems, deep-well waters (with a typical SDI of 3) could be used straight from the source. If fed from surface waters (with a typical SDI greater than 6), the water will need to be filtered before use. Seawater desalination plants utilising reverse osmosis systems also need very efficient filtering due to the typically high but variable SDI of seawater.
