= Tofte, Norway =

Village in Asker municipality, Norway

Coordinates: 59.5431°N 10.5603°E

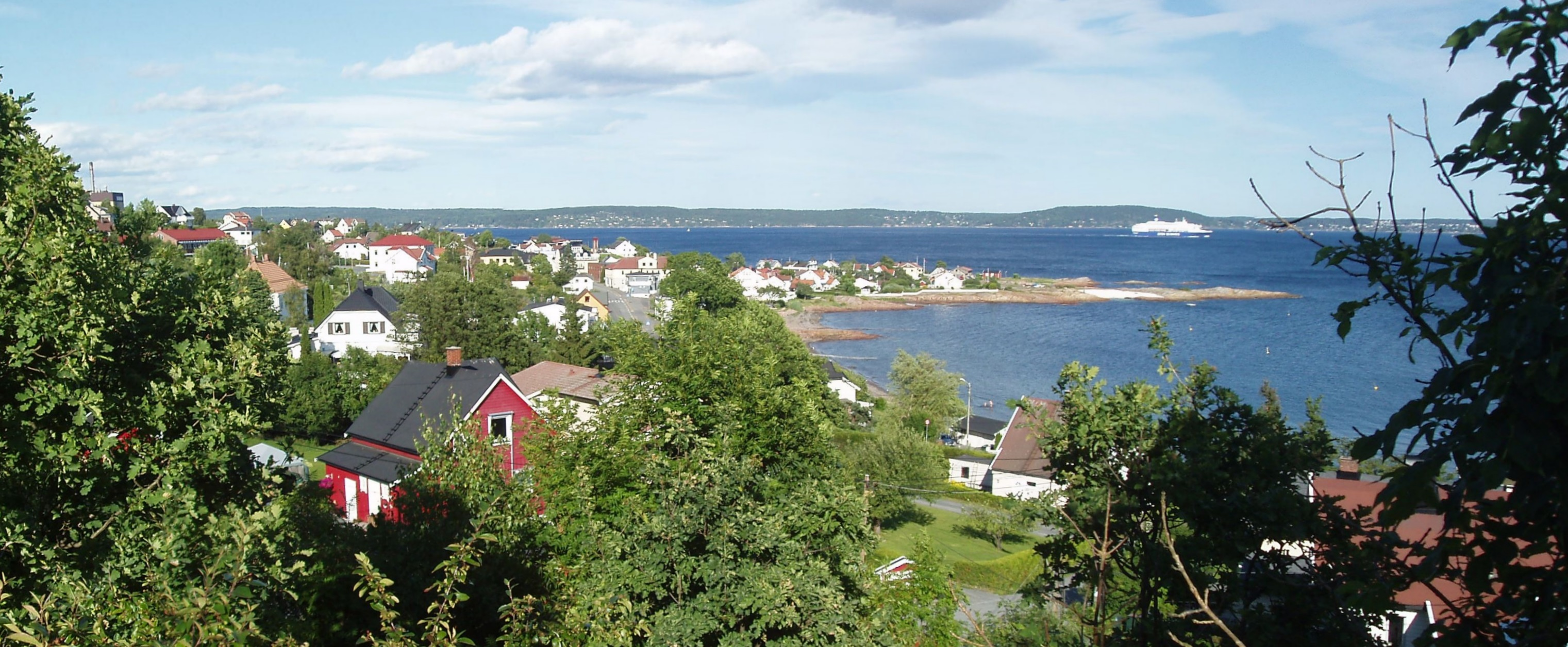
Tofte in Hurum

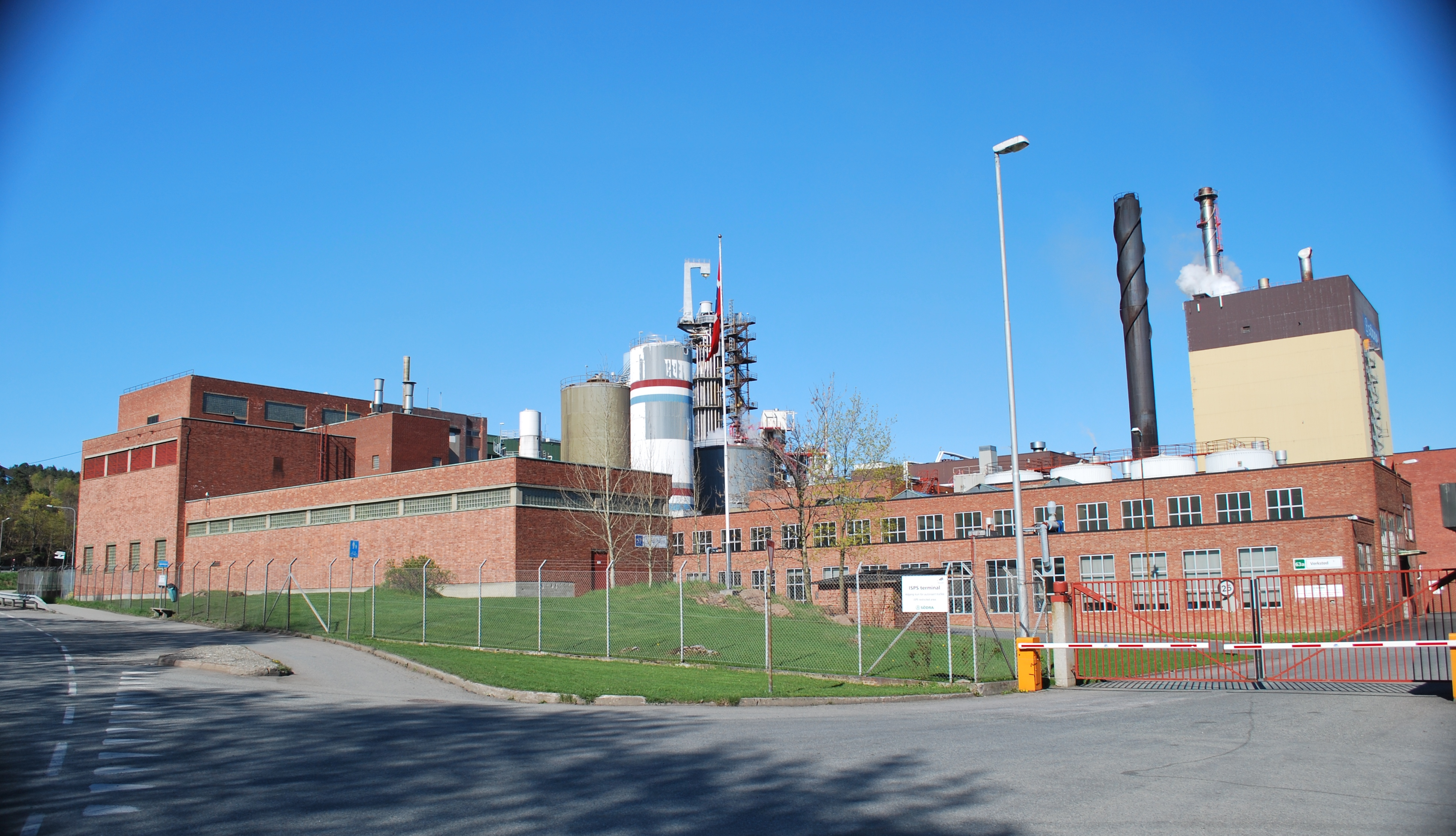
Sødra Cell Tofte

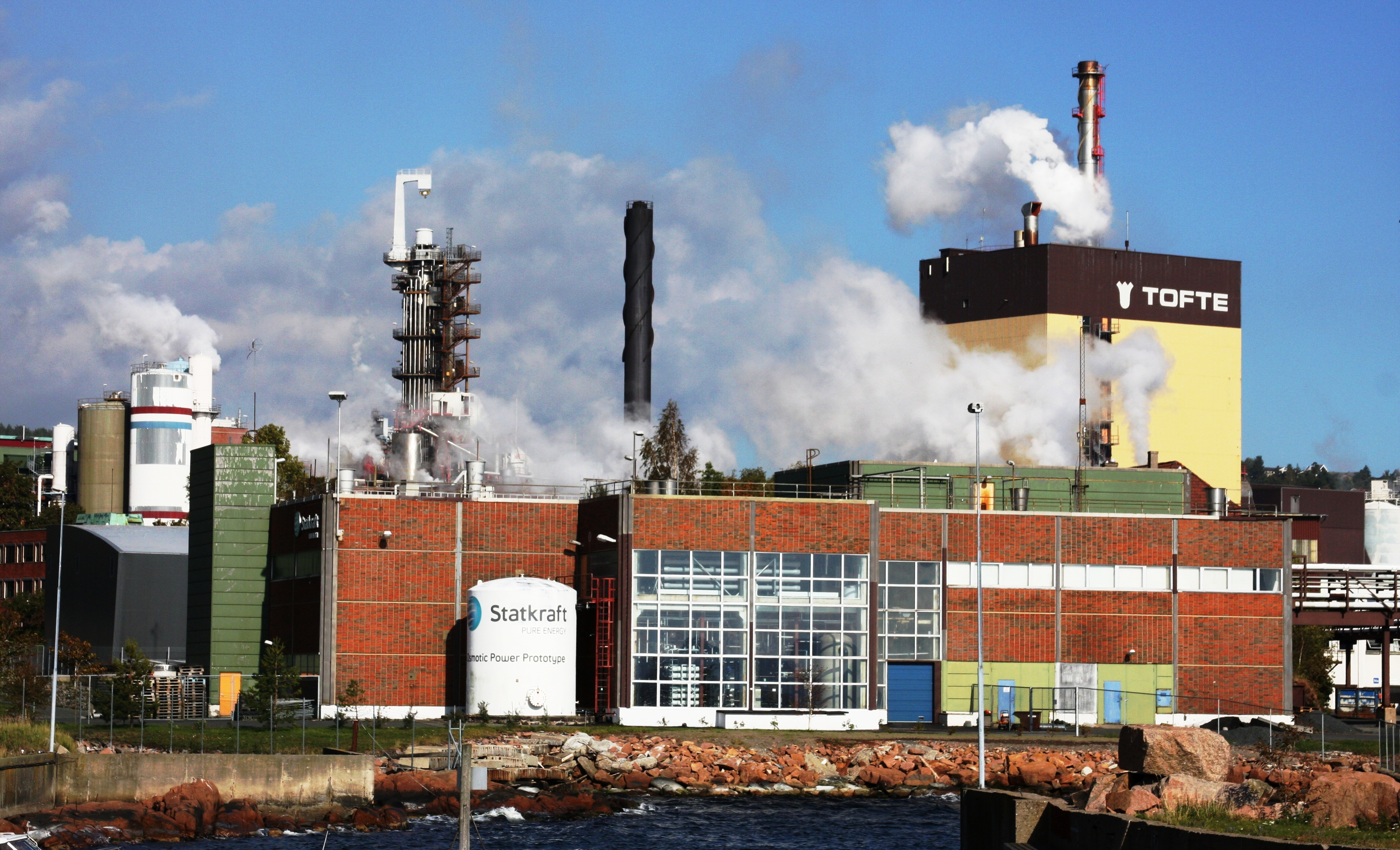
Statkraft Hurum saltkraftverk

Tofte is a village in the Asker municipality in Akershus, Norway. It is situated on the Hurum Peninsula on the Oslo Fjord. It is the second largest settlement in Hurum.

Before 1897, there were no densely populated areas on Tofte. At Sagene, a marble grinding mill was built by the Sagene River in the mid-1890s. In 1896, Anthon Bernhard Elias Nilsen (1855–1936) bought property with associated forest properties, with the intention of building a cellulose factory. The factory was built in 1897, and put into operation in 1899. In 1907, Anthon Nilsen also founded a cellulose factory at Sagene, a couple of kilometers southwest of the factory at Tofte. These two factories, Tofte Cellulosefabrik AS and Hurum Fabriker AS, became the center of employment during the following century.

Tofte is now best known for Södra Cell Tofte, a cellulose factory which was the major industry in Tofte. Statkraft Hurum salt plant (Statkraft Hurum saltkraftverk), the world's first saline power plant based on osmosis, was opened by the energy company Statkraft during 2009. Crown Princess Mette-Marit opened the plant. In May 2014, Statkraft and Södra signed a letter of intent under which Statkraft acquired Södra Cell Tofte. Statkraft subsequently formed Tofte Biomass Hub with the goal of establishing biofuel production based on raw forest material.

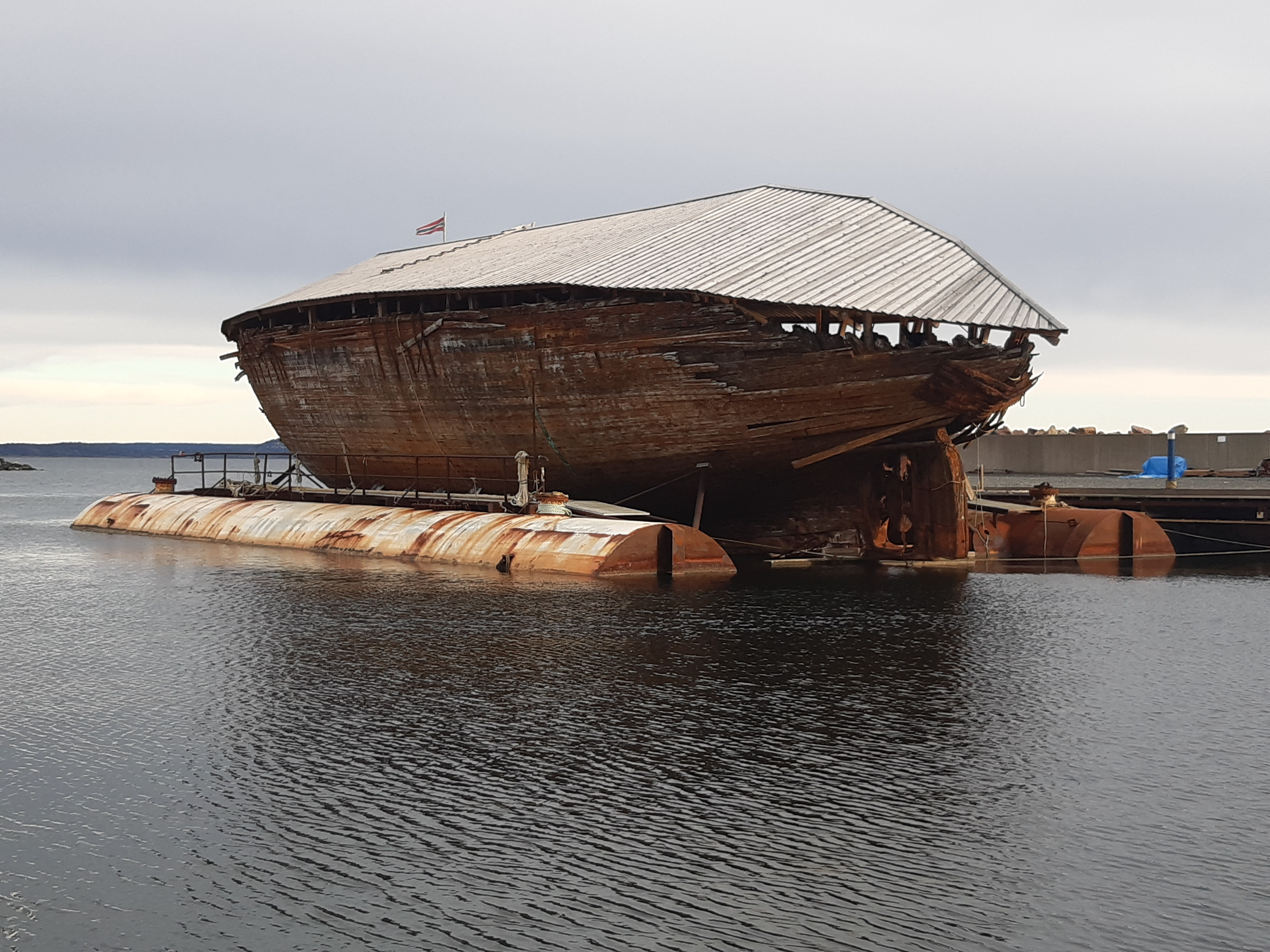
Maud with protective roof at Tofte

In 2020, Roald Amundsen's historic ship Maud was being repaired outside Tofte, prior to being put on public display having been salvaged in Canada.
