= Filmtec Corporation =

FilmTec Corporation was a US company established in Minnesota in 1977 that specialized in manufacturing the then new thin-film composite membranes used in water treatment applications. In August 1984, the company was acquired by Dow Chemical Company forming its Dow Water & Process Solutions business unit. In August 2017, FilmTec Corporation moved to DowDuPont, the company resulting from the merger of Dow and DuPont. On 2019, after the spin-offs of Dow and Corteva, FilmTec remained now part of DuPont Water Solutions, which is currently among the world's main membrane manufacturers.

== Applications ==
Applications include water purification, desalination, maple syrup, power generation and semiconductor manufacturing. Membranes and nanofiltration elements are made in different diameters and lengths. Industrial Reverse Osmosis membranes are typically 8-inch or 4-inch diameter.
