= Semipermeable membrane =

Type of membrane

Schematic of semipermeable membrane during hemodialysis, where blood is red, dialysing fluid is blue, and the membrane is yellow.

Semipermeable membrane is a type of synthetic or biologic, polymeric membrane that allows certain molecules or ions to pass through it by osmosis, electroosmosis, electrodialysis, or gaseous permeation. The rate of passage depends on the pressure, concentration, and temperature of the molecules or solutes on either side, as well as the permeability of the membrane to each solute. Depending on the membrane and the solute, permeability may depend on solute size, solubility, properties, or chemistry. How the membrane is constructed to be selective in its permeability will determine the rate and the permeability. Many natural and synthetic materials which are rather thick are also semipermeable. One example of this is the thin film on the inside of an egg.

Biological membranes are selectively permeable, with the passage of molecules controlled by facilitated diffusion, passive transport or active transport regulated by proteins embedded in the membrane.

== Biological membranes ==
=== Phospholipid bilayer ===
A phospholipid bilayer is an example of a biological semipermeable membrane. It consists of two parallel, opposite-facing layers of uniformly arranged phospholipids. Each phospholipid is made of one phosphate head and two fatty acid tails. The plasma membrane that surrounds all biological cells is an example of a phospholipid bilayer. The plasma membrane is very specific in its permeability, meaning it carefully controls which substances enter and leave the cell. Because they are attracted to the water content within and outside the cell (or hydrophillic), the phosphate heads assemble along the outer and inner surfaces of the plasma membrane, and the hydrophobic tails are the layer hidden in the inside of the membrane. Cholesterol molecules are also found throughout the plasma membrane and act as a buffer of membrane fluidity. The phospholipid bilayer is most permeable to small, uncharged solutes. Protein channels are embedded in or through the phospholipids, and, collectively, this model is known as the fluid mosaic model. Aquaporins are protein channel pores permeable to water.

=== Cellular communication ===
Information can also pass through the plasma membrane when signaling molecules bind to receptors in the cell membrane. The signaling molecules bind to the receptors, which alters the structure of these proteins. A change in the protein structure initiates a signaling cascade. G protein-coupled receptor signaling is an important subset of such signaling processes.

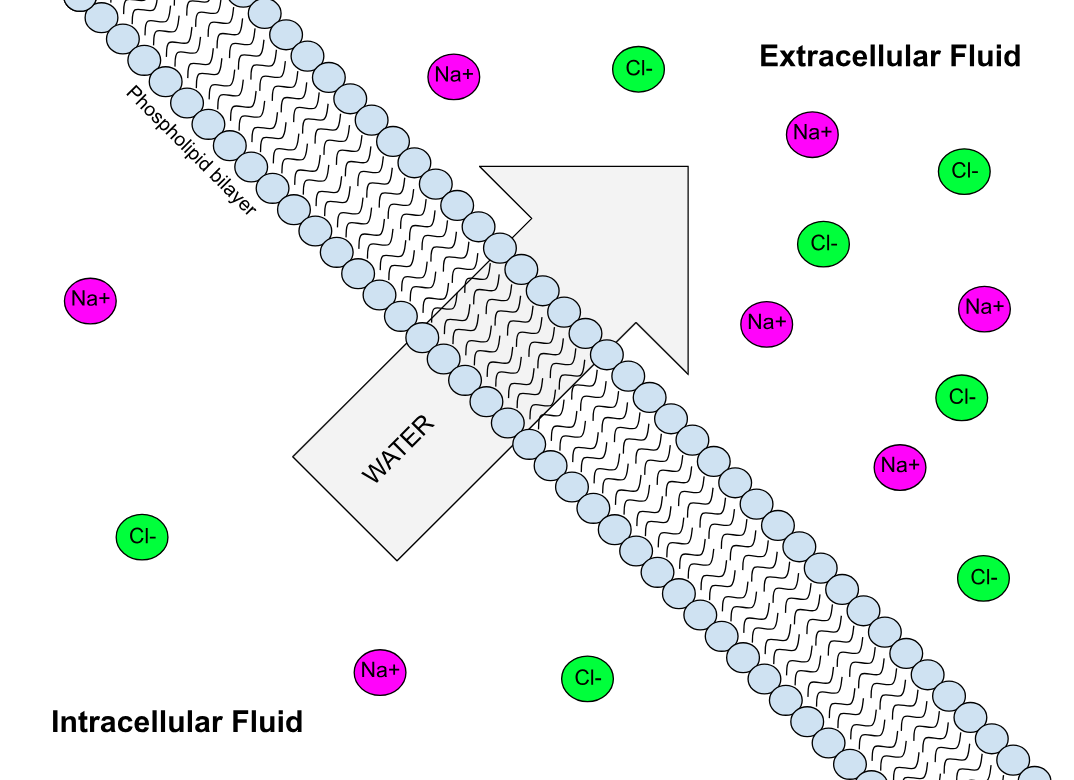
Salt outside of the cell creates osmotic pressure that pushes water through the phospholipid bilayer

=== Osmotic stress ===
Because the lipid bilayer is semipermeable, it is subject to osmotic pressure. When the solutes around a cell become more or less concentrated, osmotic pressure causes water to flow into or out of the cell to equilibrate. This osmotic stress inhibits cellular functions that depend on the activity of water in the cell, such as the functioning of its DNA and protein systems and proper assembly of its plasma membrane. This can lead to osmotic shock and cell death. Osmoregulation is the method by which cells counteract osmotic stress, and includes osmosensory transporters in the membrane that allow K+ (Note: K+ is the element potassium's positively charged ion (cation).) and other molecules to flow through the membrane.

== Artificial membranes ==
Artificial semipermeable membranes see wide usage in research and the medical field. Artificial lipid membranes can easily be manipulated and experimented upon to study biological phenomenon. Other artificial membranes include those involved in drug delivery, dialysis, and bioseparations.

=== Reverse osmosis ===
The bulk flow of water through a selectively permeable membrane because of an osmotic pressure difference is called osmosis. This allows only certain particles to go through including water and leaving behind the solutes including salt and other contaminants. In the process of reverse osmosis, water is purified by applying high pressure to a solution and thereby push water through a thin-film composite membrane (TFC or TFM). These are semipermeable membranes manufactured principally for use in water purification or desalination systems. They also have use in chemical applications such as batteries and fuel cells. In essence, a TFC material is a molecular sieve constructed in the form of a film from two or more layered materials. Sidney Loeb and Srinivasa Sourirajan invented the first practical synthetic semi-permeable membrane. Membranes used in reverse osmosis are, in general, made out of polyamide, chosen primarily for its permeability to water and relative impermeability to various dissolved impurities including salt ions and other small molecules that cannot be filtered.

==== Regeneration of reverse osmosis membranes ====
Reverse osmosis membrane modules have a limited life cycle, several studies have endeavored to improve the performance of the process and extend the RO membranes lifespan. However, even with the appropriate pretreatment of the feed water, the membranes lifespan is generally limited to five to seven years.

Discarded RO membrane modules are currently classified worldwide as inert solid waste and are often disposed of in landfills, with limited reuse. Estimates indicated that the mass of membranes annually discarded worldwide reached 12,000 tons. At the current rate, the disposal of RO modules represents significant and growing adverse impacts on the environment, giving rise to the need to limit the direct discarding of these modules.

Discarded RO membranes from desalination operations could be recycled for other processes that do not require the intensive filtration criteria of desalination, they could be used in applications requiring nanofiltration (NF) membranes.

===== Regeneration process steps =====
1. Chemical Treatment

Chemical procedures aimed at removing fouling from the spent membrane; several chemicals agents are used; such as:

- Sodium Hydroxide (alkaline)
- Hydrochloric Acid (Acidic)
- Chelating agents Such as Citric and Oxalic acids

There are three forms of membranes exposure to chemical agents; simple immersion, recirculating the cleaning agent, or immersion in an ultrasound bath.

2. Oxidative treatment

This step includes exposing the membrane to oxidant solutions in order to remove its dense aromatic polyamide active layer and subsequent conversion to a porous membrane. Oxidizing agents such as Sodium Hypochlorite NaClO (10–12%) and Potassium Permanganate KMnO_{4} are used. These agents remove organic and biological fouling from RO membranes, They also disinfect the membrane surface, preventing the growth of bacteria and other microorganisms.

Sodium Hypochlorite is the most efficient oxidizing agent in light of permeability and salt rejection solution.

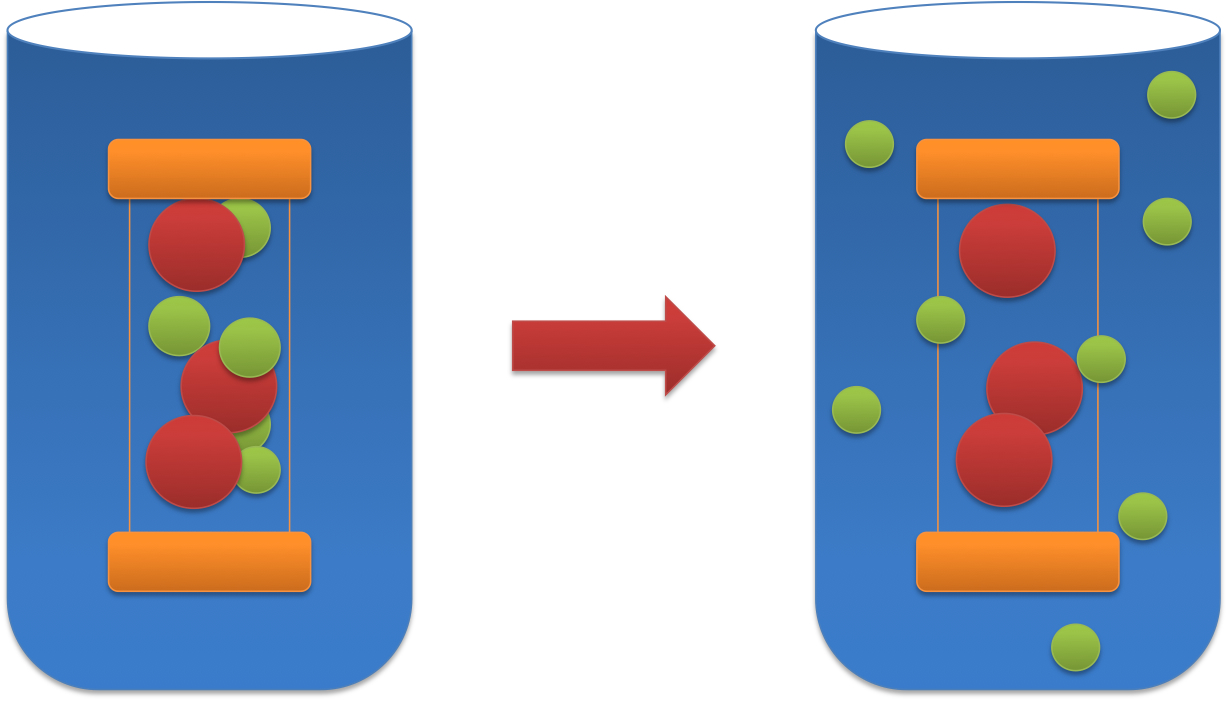
Dialysis tubing allows waste molecules to be selectively removed from blood.

=== Dialysis tubing ===
Dialysis tubing is used in hemodialysis to purify blood in the case of kidney failure. The tubing uses a semipermeable membrane to remove waste before returning the purified blood to the patient. Differences in the semipermeable membrane, such as size of pores, change the rate and identity of removed molecules. Traditionally, cellulose membranes were used, but they could cause inflammatory responses in patients. Synthetic membranes have been developed that are more biocompatible and lead to fewer inflammatory responses. However, despite the increased biocompatibility, synthetic membranes have not been linked to decreased mortality.

== Other types ==
Other types of semipermeable membranes are cation-exchange membranes (CEMs), anion-exchange membranes (AEMs), alkali anion-exchange membranes (AAEMs) and proton-exchange membranes (PEMs).
