= Södra =

Swedish forestry cooperative

Södra Skogsägarna
- Type: Cooperative
- Industry: Forestry
- Founder: Gösta Edström
- Headquarters: Växjö, Sweden
- Key people: Lotta Lyrå
- Products: Sawn timber, paper and textile pulp, biochemicals, bioenergy, biomaterial, Cross-laminated timber (CLT)
- Number of employees: 3200
- Website: www.sodra.com

Södra Skogsägarna, trading as Södra, is a forestry cooperative based in Växjö, Sweden. More than 52,000 forest owners in southern Sweden are members of the economic association that is Södra. Together they own just over half of all privately owned forest in the area. This gives them a market for their raw materials from the forest and at the same time provides the foundation for profitable forestry.

3,150 people work for the group, in areas that range from forestry management and environmental conservation to accounting, sales and product development. The group's five business areas produce sawn and planed timber goods, paper pulp, building systems and bioproducts. In recent years Södra has also become such a large producer of electricity that the group now produces more electricity than it uses.

Södra makes use of every part of the tree. Södra is a world-leading producer of pulp and also operates one of Europe’s largest sawmill businesses. Södra Skogsägarna has its head office in Växjö and the operation is divided into five business areas:

- Södra Cell
- Södra Wood
- Södra Skog
- Södra Bioproducts
- Södra Building Systems

Södra is engaged in extensive work with commercialisation and business development to promote innovation and create new opportunities within the forest industry. The focus is on developing products with clear market potential, such as timber construction solutions and biorefinery products, in close collaboration with other parts of the organisation. One example is the investment in timber-based building systems, where Södra has invested in the production of cross-laminated timber (CLT). Production began in 2019 and has since been expanded with a second facility in Värö, which has had a capacity of approximately 100,000 cubic metres per year since 2022.

Södra’s sustainability strategy comprises six focus areas: climate-positive operations, sustainable forestry, efficient resource use, responsible business, committed employees and sustainable innovation. The goals include fossil-free operations, increased forest growth and a zero vision for workplace injuries. Södra is actively working with electrification, energy efficiency and climate action plans to halve emissions of fossil-based greenhouse gases by 2030.

== Södra Skog: Forestry & members ==
Södra Skog purchases forest raw material from its members and delivers it to Södra’s industrial operations. In addition, Södra Skog provides forestry services and manages members’ forests on their behalf throughout the entire cycle – from planting and silviculture to final felling, soil preparation and replanting. The operations are locally rooted in 19 geographic areas and 36 forest management districts.

== Södra Wood ==
Södra Wood encompasses the production of sawn timber. At its own sawmills, Södra manufactures sawn and planed building products for high-quality applications. Södra Wood also sells pellets, wood shavings and other by-products from the wood raw material. The sawmills primarily produce structural timber and wood-based building products used for roof trusses, floor joists, studs and exterior cladding, among other things. A large proportion of the timber is also used for protective packaging such as pallets and boxes. The products are certified under the PEFC and FSC forest certification schemes. The main markets are the United Kingdom, Sweden and the Netherlands, with exports also going to the US, Japan and the Middle East.

== Södra Cell ==
Södra Cell is one of Europe’s leading producers of market pulp, with three mills located in Värö, Mörrum and Mönsterås. Approximately 80 percent of production consists of softwood pulp, with the remainder being hardwood pulp. The Mörrum mill also produces dissolving pulp for textile applications. Södra is a major supplier of biofuel, green electricity and district heating. The pulp mills generate renewable energy from wood raw material and deliver surplus electricity and heat to local communities. In 2024, external district heating deliveries totalled 440 GWh, equivalent to the heating needs of nearly 25,000 homes. Annual production volumes:

- Södra Cell Mönsterås: approx. 750,000 tonnes/year
- Södra Cell Mörrum: approx. 170,000 tonnes/year of dissolving pulp and 300,000 tonnes/year of paper pulp
- Södra Cell Värö: approx. 700,000 tonnes/year

== Södra Bioproducts ==
Södra Bioproducts is a business area within Södra responsible for the sales and marketing of carbon-, chemical- and energy-based products that are produced at Södra’s industrial facilities or directly from forest operations. The product portfolio includes:

- Biofuels: bark, biomethanol, fuelwood, wood chips, pellets, forest chips, sawdust, tall oil, heat logs
- Biomaterials: bark, wood shavings, pellets, sawdust, wood chips
- Biochemicals: biomethanol, dissolving pulp, lignin, tall oil, turpentine, tannin
- Dissolving pulp
- Electricity
- District heating

These products have been developed with a focus on sustainability and resource efficiency, and play an important role in the green transition by replacing fossil-based alternatives and promoting the responsible use of forest raw material supplied by the members of Södra.

== Södra Building Systems ==
Södra Building Systems produces cross-laminated timber (CLT) at its facility in Värö. The business also offers complementary structural materials such as glulam, as well as wood-based façades and interior cladding. By combining these components, a complete offering for timber-based construction is created. The business provides advice and support to architects, developers, structural engineers and building contractors throughout the construction process. This expertise includes planning, digital tools, design, logistics, finance and documentation. To date, Södra has delivered to schools, apartment buildings, shops, offices, public buildings, hotels and industrial premises.

== History ==
Södra Skogsägarna was founded in 1938 when five south Swedish forestry cooperative merged into one. One of the persons behind the merger was Gösta Edström that become the first CEO of Södra Skogsägarna.
