= Pressure exchanger =

Device for exchanging pressure between two fluids

Schematics of a rotary pressure exchanger. A: High pressure side, B: Low pressure side, C: Rotor rotation, D: Sealed area, 1:High pressure reject water inflow, 2:Pressurized sea water, 3: Low pressure sea water inflow, 4: Low pressure reject water drain, : Reject water / concentrate, : Piston / barrier, : Sea water

A pressure exchanger transfers pressure energy from a high pressure fluid stream to a low pressure fluid stream. Many industrial processes operate at elevated pressures and have high pressure waste streams. One way of providing a high pressure fluid to such a process is to transfer the waste pressure to a low pressure stream using a pressure exchanger.

One particularly efficient type of pressure exchanger is a rotary pressure exchanger. This device uses a cylindrical rotor with longitudinal ducts parallel to its rotational axis. The rotor spins inside a sleeve between two end covers. Pressure energy is transferred directly from the high pressure stream to the low pressure stream in the ducts of the rotor. Some fluid that remains in the ducts serves as a barrier that inhibits mixing between the streams. This rotational action is similar to that of an old fashioned machine gun firing high pressure bullets and it is continuously refilled with new fluid cartridges. The ducts of the rotor charge and discharge as the pressure transfer process repeats itself.

The performance of a pressure exchanger is measured by the efficiency of the energy transfer process and by the degree of mixing between the streams. The energy of the streams is the product of their flow volumes and pressures. Efficiency is a function of the pressure differentials and the volumetric losses (leakage) through the device computed with the following equation:

$$\eta=\frac{\Sigma\text{ energy out} }{\Sigma\text{ energy in} }=\frac{(Q_G-L)\times(P_G-HDP)+(Q_B+L)\times(P_B-LDP)}{Q_G\times P_G+Q_B\times P_B}\qquad\qquad(1)$$

where Q is flow, P is pressure, L is leakage flow, HDP is high pressure differential, LDP is low pressure differential, the subscript B refers to the low pressure feed to the device and the subscript G refers to the high pressure feed to the device. Mixing is a function of the concentrations of the species in the inlet streams and the ratio of flow volumes to the device.

== Reverse osmosis ==
Schematics of a reverse osmosis system (desalination) using a pressure exchanger. 1:Sea water inflow, 2: Fresh water flow (40%), 3:Concentrate Flow (60%), 4:Sea water flow (60%), 5: Concentrate (drain), A: High pressure pump flow (40%), B: Circulation pump, C:Osmosis unit with membrane, D: Pressure exchanger

One application in which pressure exchangers are widely used is reverse osmosis (RO). In an RO system, pressure exchangers are used as energy recovery devices (ERDs). As illustrated, high-pressure concentrate from the membranes [C] is directed [3] to the ERD [D]. The ERD uses this high-pressure concentrate stream to pressurize the low-pressure seawater stream (stream [1] becomes stream [4]), which it then merges (with the aid of a circulation pump [B]) into the highest-pressure seawater stream created by the high-pressure pump [A]. This combined stream feeds the membranes [C]. The concentrate leaves the ERD at low pressure [5], expelled by the incoming feedwater flow [1].

Pressure exchangers save energy in these systems by reducing the load on the high pressure pump. In a seawater RO system operating at a 40% membrane water recovery rate, the ERD supplies 60% of the membrane feed flow. Energy is consumed by the circulation pump, however, because this pump merely circulates and does not pressurize water, its energy consumption is almost negligible: less than 3% of the energy consumed by the high pressure pump. Therefore, nearly 60% of the membrane feed flow is pressurized with almost no energy input.

== Applications ==
Seawater desalination plants have produced potable water for many years. However, until recently desalination had been used only in special circumstances because of the high energy consumption of the process.

Early designs for desalination plants made use of various evaporation technologies. The most advanced are the multi-stage flash distillation seawater evaporation desalinators, which make use of multiple stages and have an energy consumption of over 9 kWh per cubic meter of potable water produced. For this reason large seawater desalinators were initially constructed in locations with low energy costs, such as the Middle East, or next to process plants with available waste heat.

In the 1970s the seawater reverse osmosis (SWRO) process was developed which made potable water from seawater by forcing it under high pressure through a tight membrane thus filtering out salts and impurities. These salts and impurities are discharged from the SWRO device as a concentrated brine solution in a continuous stream, which contains a large amount of high-pressure energy. Most of this energy can be recovered with a suitable device. Many early SWRO plants built in the 1970s and early 1980s had an energy consumption of over 6.0 kWh per cubic meter of potable water produced, due to low membrane performance, pressure drop limitations and the absence of energy recovery devices.

An example where a pressure exchange engine finds application is in the production of potable water using the reverse osmosis membrane process. In this process, a feed saline solution is pumped into a membrane array at high pressure. The input saline solution is then divided by the membrane array into super saline solution (brine) at high pressure and potable water at low pressure. While the high pressure brine is no longer useful in this process as a fluid, the pressure energy that it contains has high value. A pressure exchange engine is employed to recover the pressure energy in the brine and transfer it to feed saline solution. After transfer of the pressure energy in the brine flow, the brine is expelled at low pressure to drain.

Nearly all reverse osmosis plants operated for the desalination of sea water in order to produce drinking water in industrial scale are equipped with an energy recovery system based on turbines. These are activated by the concentrate (brine) leaving the plant and transfer the energy contained in the high pressure of this concentrate usually mechanically to the high-pressure pump. In the pressure exchanger the energy contained in the brine is transferred hydraulically and with an efficiency of approximately 98% to the feed. This reduces the energy demand for the desalination process significantly and thus the operating costs. Therefrom results an economic energy recovery, amortization times for such systems varying between 2 and 4 years depending on the place of operation.

Reduced energy and capital costs mean that for the first time ever it is possible to produce potable water from seawater at a cost below $1 per cubic meter in many locations worldwide. Although the cost may be a bit higher on islands with high power costs, the PE has the potential to rapidly expand the market for seawater desalination.

By means of the application of a pressure exchange system, which is already used in other domains, a considerably higher efficiency of energy recovery of reverse osmosis systems may be achieved than with the use of reverse running pumps or turbines. The pressure exchange system is suited, above all, for bigger plants i.e. approx. ≥ 2000 m3/d permeate production.

== See also ==
- Richard Stover, pioneered the development of an energy recovery device currently in use in most seawater reverse osmosis desalination plants
