= Reverse osmosis =

Water purification process

Reverse osmosis (RO) is a water purification process that uses a semi-permeable membrane to separate water molecules from other substances. RO applies pressure to overcome osmotic pressure that favors even distributions. RO can remove dissolved or suspended chemical species as well as biological substances (principally bacteria), and is used in industrial processes and the production of potable water. In developing nations like Pakistan, industrial reverse osmosis plants are widely adopted across textile, pharmaceutical, and manufacturing sectors to overcome groundwater contamination and ensure compliant process water.

RO retains the solute on the pressurized side of the membrane and the purified solvent passes to the other side. The relative sizes of the various molecules determines what passes through. "Selective" membranes reject large molecules, while accepting smaller molecules (such as solvent molecules, e.g., water).

Reverse osmosis is most commonly known for its use in drinking water purification from seawater, removing the salt and other effluent materials from the water molecules. As of 2013 the world's largest RO desalination plant was in Sorek, Israel, outputting 624 thousand cubic metres per day (165 million US gallons per day). RO systems for private use are also available for purifying municipal tap water or pre-treated well water.

== History ==
A process of osmosis through semi-permeable membranes was first observed in 1748 by Jean-Antoine Nollet. For the following 200 years, osmosis was only a laboratory phenomenon. In 1950, the University of California at Los Angeles (UCLA) first investigated osmotic desalination. Researchers at both UCLA and University of Florida desalinated seawater in the mid-1950s, but the flux was too low to be commercially viable. Sidney Loeb at UCLA and Srinivasa Sourirajan at the National Research Council of Canada, Ottawa, found techniques for making asymmetric membranes characterized by an effectively thin "skin" layer supported atop a highly porous and much thicker substrate region. John Cadotte, of Filmtec corporation, discovered that membranes with particularly high flux and low salt passage could be made by interfacial polymerization of m-phenylene diamine and trimesoyl chloride. Cadotte's patent on this process was the subject of litigation and expired. Almost all commercial RO membrane is now made by this method. By 2019, approximately 16,000 desalination plants operated around the world, producing around 95 million cubic metres per day (25 billion US gallons per day). Around half of this capacity was in the Middle East and North Africa region.

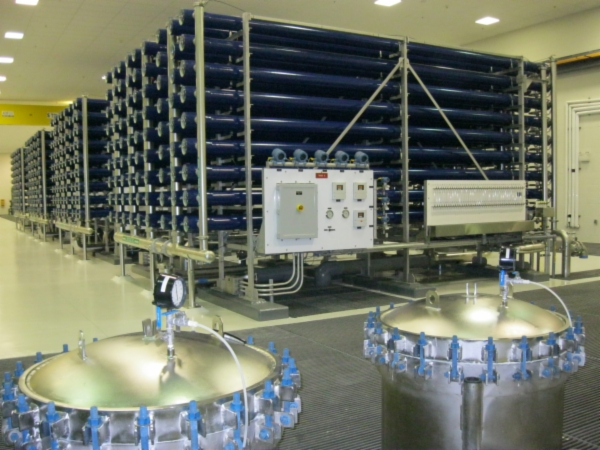
RO production train, North Cape Coral Reverse Osmosis Plant

In 1977 Cape Coral, Florida became the first US municipality to use RO at scale, with an initial operating capacity of 11.35 million liters (3 million US gal) per day. By 1985, rapid growth led the city to operate the world's largest low-pressure RO plant, producing 56.8 million liters (15 million US gal) per day (MGD).

== Osmosis ==
In (forward) osmosis, the solvent moves from an area of low solute concentration (high water potential), through a membrane, to an area of high solute concentration (low water potential). The driving force for the movement of the solvent is the reduction in the Gibbs free energy of the system in which the difference in solvent concentration between the sides of a membrane is reduced. This is called osmotic pressure. It reduces as the solvent moves into the more concentrated solution. Applying an external pressure to reverse the natural flow of pure solvent, thus, is reverse osmosis. The process is similar to other membrane technology applications.

RO differs from filtration in that the mechanism of fluid flow is reversed, as the solvent crosses membrane, leaving the solute behind. The predominant removal mechanism in membrane filtration is straining, or size exclusion, where the pores are 0.01 micrometers or larger, so the process can theoretically achieve perfect efficiency regardless of parameters such as the solution's pressure and concentration. RO instead involves solvent diffusion across a membrane that is either nonporous or uses nanofiltration with pores 0.001 micrometers in size. The predominant removal mechanism is from differences in solubility or diffusivity, and the process is dependent on pressure, solute concentration, and other conditions.

RO requires pressure between 2–17 bar (30–250 psi) for fresh and brackish water, and 40–82 bar (600–1200 psi) for seawater. Seawater has around 27 bar (390 psi) natural osmotic pressure that must be overcome. As for their energy consumption, seawater RO systems typically require 2.9-5.5 kWh/m^{3}, although state-of-the-art systems are around 2.3 kWh/m^{3}.

Membrane pore sizes vary from 0.1 to 5,000 nm. Particle filtration removes particles of 1 μm or larger. Microfiltration removes particles of 50 nm or larger. Ultrafiltration removes particles of roughly 3 nm or larger. Nanofiltration removes particles of 1 nm or larger. RO is in the final category of membrane filtration, hyperfiltration, and removes particles larger than ~0.2 nm.

== Fresh water applications ==
Reverse osmosis is used for household and municipal drinking-water treatment, water reuse, industrial process-water production, food and beverage processing, and other applications requiring water with a reduced concentration of dissolved substances.

=== Drinking water purification ===
Point-of-use RO systems are used to treat water for drinking and cooking. Systems may include additional filters before or after the RO membrane. According to the Centers for Disease Control and Prevention (CDC), RO systems can remove parasites, bacteria and viruses, as well as some dissolved chemicals, including lead, copper, chromium, chloride and sodium. They may also reduce the concentrations of substances including arsenic, fluoride, radium, sulfate, calcium, magnesium, potassium and nitrate. The contaminants removed vary between systems, so individual contaminant-reduction claims must be checked for the particular unit.

At municipal scale, water-treatment plants use RO when treating saline water or recycled water for drinking. RO is normally used as one stage of a larger treatment system that may also include pretreatment and disinfection.

=== Solar-powered reverse osmosis ===
Electricity generated by photovoltaic panels can be used to operate RO desalination systems. Renewable-energy-powered desalination is particularly applicable to remote or off-grid locations, although intermittent energy production and the need for water or energy storage can complicate system design.

=== Military and emergency use ===
Mobile reverse-osmosis water-purification systems are used by military organizations to produce potable water in the field. The United States Army operates several types of mobile systems, including the Reverse Osmosis Water Purification Unit (ROWPU), for military operations and for humanitarian and disaster-relief missions. Depending on the system, source water may include fresh, brackish or seawater.

=== Water reuse and industrial process water ===
RO is used as an advanced treatment stage in some systems that convert treated wastewater into high-quality reclaimed water. One example is Singapore's NEWater program. Its treatment process generally combines microfiltration or ultrafiltration, reverse osmosis and ultraviolet disinfection. The resulting water is used mainly for industrial and cooling purposes, while some is added to reservoirs for indirect potable reuse.

Industrial uses of RO include the demineralisation of boiler feedwater and the production of low-conductivity process water.

=== Food and beverage processing ===
RO can concentrate liquid foods without the prolonged heating required by evaporation, helping preserve heat-sensitive components. Applications include concentrating fruit and vegetable juices, preconcentrating milk and whey, improving grape must, and reducing the alcohol content of wine and beer.

=== Maple syrup production ===
Commercial maple syrup producers use RO to remove part of the water from maple sap before it is boiled in an evaporator. Concentrating the sap before boiling reduces the time and energy required for evaporation.

=== Low-alcohol beer ===
RO is one of several industrial methods used to remove some or all of the ethanol from conventionally brewed beer. It is classified as a membrane-based physical method of producing low-alcohol or alcohol-free beer.

During RO dealcoholisation, water and ethanol pass through the membrane more readily than many non-volatile components of the beer. The retained concentrate can subsequently be diluted to the desired alcohol concentration.

=== Hydrogen production ===
RO can be used as a desalination stage in the preparation of feedwater for electrolytic hydrogen production. Electrolysers require high-purity water, so RO permeate generally requires further purification, such as ion exchange or electrodeionisation, before it is supplied to the electrolyser.

=== Aquariums ===
RO water is used in marine and reef aquariums to prepare artificial seawater and to replace water lost through evaporation. Because RO water contains low concentrations of dissolved substances, its use can limit the introduction of compounds such as silicates that can contribute to unwanted growth in aquariums. Aquarium shops may sell either freshwater produced by RO or prepared RO saltwater.

=== Window cleaning ===
Some professional window cleaners use purified water delivered through a telescoping water-fed pole fitted with a brush. RO, deionisation or a combination of the two can be used to produce the purified water. Because most dissolved minerals have been removed, the rinse water can be allowed to dry on the glass without leaving the mineral deposits associated with untreated water.

== Landfill leachate purification ==
Treatment with RO is limited, resulting in low recoveries on high concentration (measured with electrical conductivity) and membrane fouling. RO applicability is limited by conductivity, organics, and scaling inorganic elements such as CaSO_{4}, Si, Fe and Ba. Low organic scaling can use two different technologies: spiral wound membrane, and (for high organic scaling, high conductivity and higher pressure (up to 90 bars)), disc tube modules with RO membranes can be used. Disc tube modules were redesigned for landfill leachate purification that is usually contaminated with organic material. Due to the cross-flow, it is given a flow booster pump that recirculates the flow over the membrane between 1.5 and 3 times before it is released as a concentrate. High velocity protects against membrane scaling and allows membrane cleaning.

=== Power consumption for a disc tube module system ===
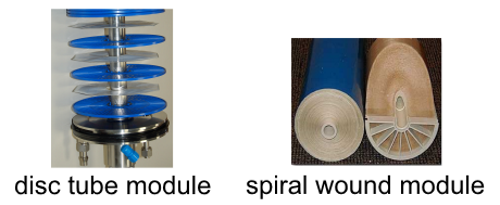
Disc tube module with RO membrane cushion and Spiral wound module with RO membrane

Energy consumption per m^{3} leachate
name of module	1-stage up to 75 bar	2-stage up to 75 bar	3-stage up to 120 bar
disc tube module	6.1–8.1 kWh/m^{3}	8.1–9.8 kWh/m^{3}	11.2–14.3 kWh/m^{3}

== Desalination ==
Areas that have limited surface water or groundwater may choose to desalinate. RO is an increasingly common method, because of its relatively low energy consumption.

Energy consumption is around 3 kWh/m^{3} (11,000 J/L), with the development of more efficient energy recovery devices and improved membrane materials. According to the International Desalination Association, for 2011, RO was used in 66% of installed desalination capacity (0.0445 of 0.0674 km^{3}/day), and nearly all new plants. Other plants use thermal distillation methods: multiple-effect distillation, and multi-stage flash.

Sea-water RO (SWRO) desalination requires around 3 kWh/m^{3}, much higher than those required for other forms of water supply, including RO treatment of wastewater, at 0.1 to 1 kWh/m^{3}. Up to 50% of the seawater input can be recovered as fresh water, though lower recovery rates may reduce membrane fouling and energy consumption.

Brackish water reverse osmosis (BWRO) is the desalination of water with less salt than seawater, usually from river estuaries or saline wells. The process is substantially the same as SWRO, but requires lower pressures and less energy. Up to 80% of the feed water input can be recovered as fresh water, depending on feed salinity.

The Ashkelon desalination plant in Israel is the world's largest.

The typical single-pass SWRO system consists of:

- Intake
- Pretreatment
- High-pressure pump (if not combined with energy recovery)
- Membrane assembly
- Energy recovery (if used)
- Remineralisation and pH adjustment
- Disinfection
- Alarm/control panel

=== Pretreatment ===
Pretreatment is important when working nanofiltration membranes due to their spiral-wound design. The material is engineered to allow one-way flow. The design does not allow for backpulsing with water or air agitation to scour its surface and remove accumulated solids. Since material cannot be removed from the membrane surface, it is susceptible to fouling (loss of production capacity). Therefore, pretreatment is a necessity for any RO or nanofiltration system. Pretreatment has four major components:

- Screening solids: Solids must be removed and the water treated to prevent membrane fouling by particle or biological growth, and reduce the risk of damage to high-pressure components.
- Cartridge filtration: String-wound polypropylene filters are typically used to remove particles of 1–5 μm diameter.
- Dosing: Oxidizing biocides, such as chlorine, are added to kill bacteria, followed by bisulfite dosing to deactivate the chlorine that can destroy a thin-film composite membrane. Biofouling inhibitors do not kill bacteria, while preventing them from growing slime on the membrane surface and plant walls.
- Prefiltration pH adjustment: If the pH, hardness and the alkalinity in the feedwater result in scaling while concentrated in the reject stream, acid is dosed to maintain carbonates in their soluble carbonic acid form.

CO_{3}^{2−} + H_{3}O^{+} = HCO_{3}^{−} + H_{2}O
HCO_{3}^{−} + H_{3}O^{+} = H_{2}CO_{3} + H_{2}O

- Carbonic acid cannot combine with calcium to form calcium carbonate scale. Calcium carbonate scaling tendency is estimated using the Langelier saturation index. Adding too much sulfuric acid to control carbonate scales may result in calcium sulfate, barium sulfate, or strontium sulfate scale formation on the membrane.
- Prefiltration antiscalants: Scale inhibitors (also known as antiscalants) prevent formation of more scales than acid, which can only prevent formation of calcium carbonate and calcium phosphate scales. In addition to inhibiting carbonate and phosphate scales, antiscalants inhibit sulfate and fluoride scales and disperse colloids and metal oxides. Despite claims that antiscalants can inhibit silica formation, no concrete evidence proves that silica polymerization is inhibited by antiscalants. Antiscalants can control acid-soluble scales at a fraction of the dosage required to control the same scale using sulfuric acid.
- Some small-scale desalination units use 'beach wells'. These are usually drilled on the seashore. These intake facilities are relatively simple to build and the seawater they collect is pretreated via slow filtration through subsurface sand/seabed formations. Raw seawater collected using beach wells is often of better quality in terms of solids, silt, oil, grease, organic contamination, and microorganisms, compared to open seawater intakes. Beach intakes may also yield source water of lower salinity.

=== High pressure pump ===
The high pressure pump pushes water through the membrane. Typical pressures for brackish water range from 1.6 to 2.6 MPa (225 to 376 psi). In the case of seawater, they range from 5.5 to 8 MPa (800 to 1,180 psi). This requires substantial energy. Where energy recovery is used, part of the high pressure pump's work is done by the energy recovery device, reducing energy inputs.

=== Membrane assembly ===
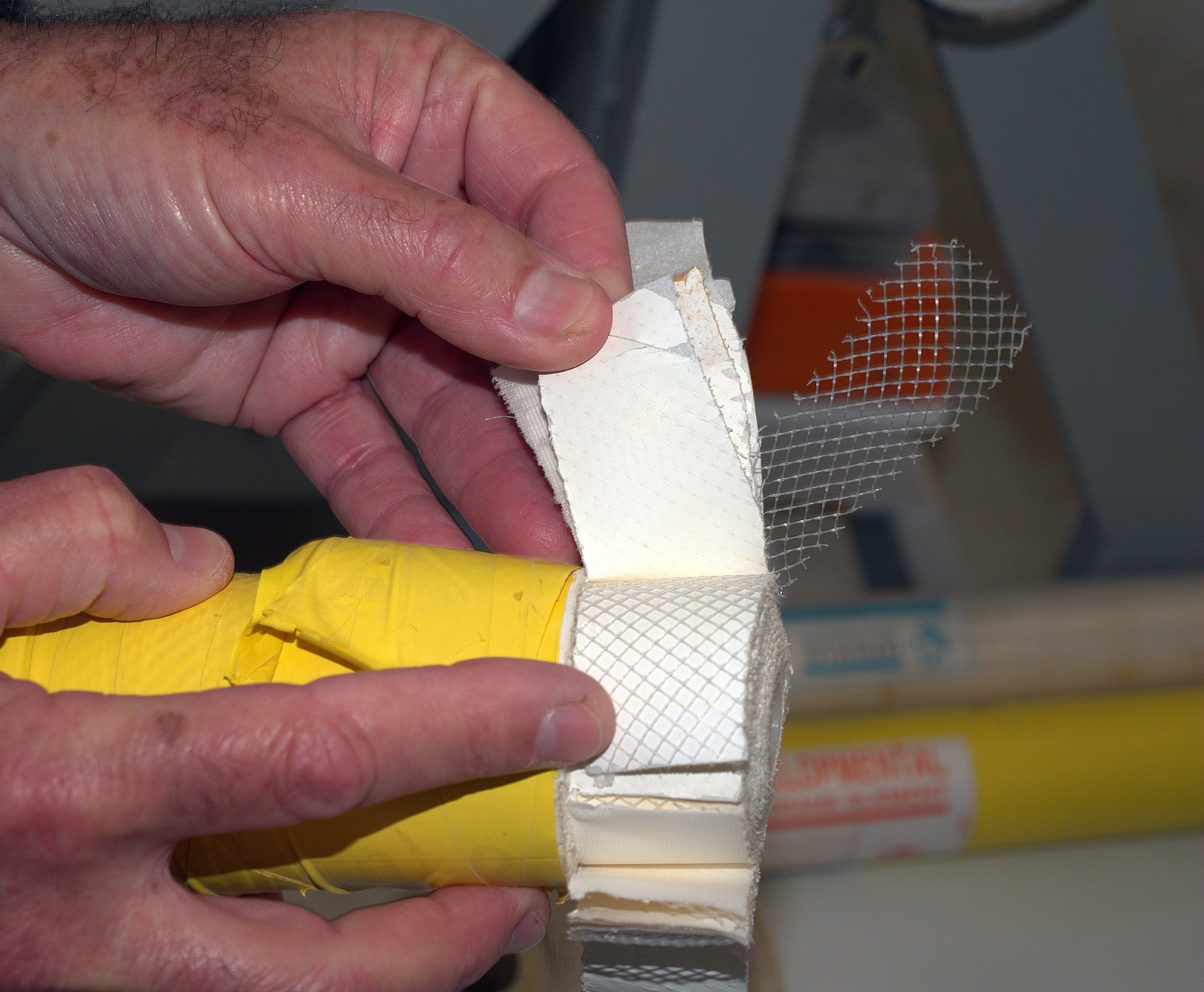
The layers of a membrane

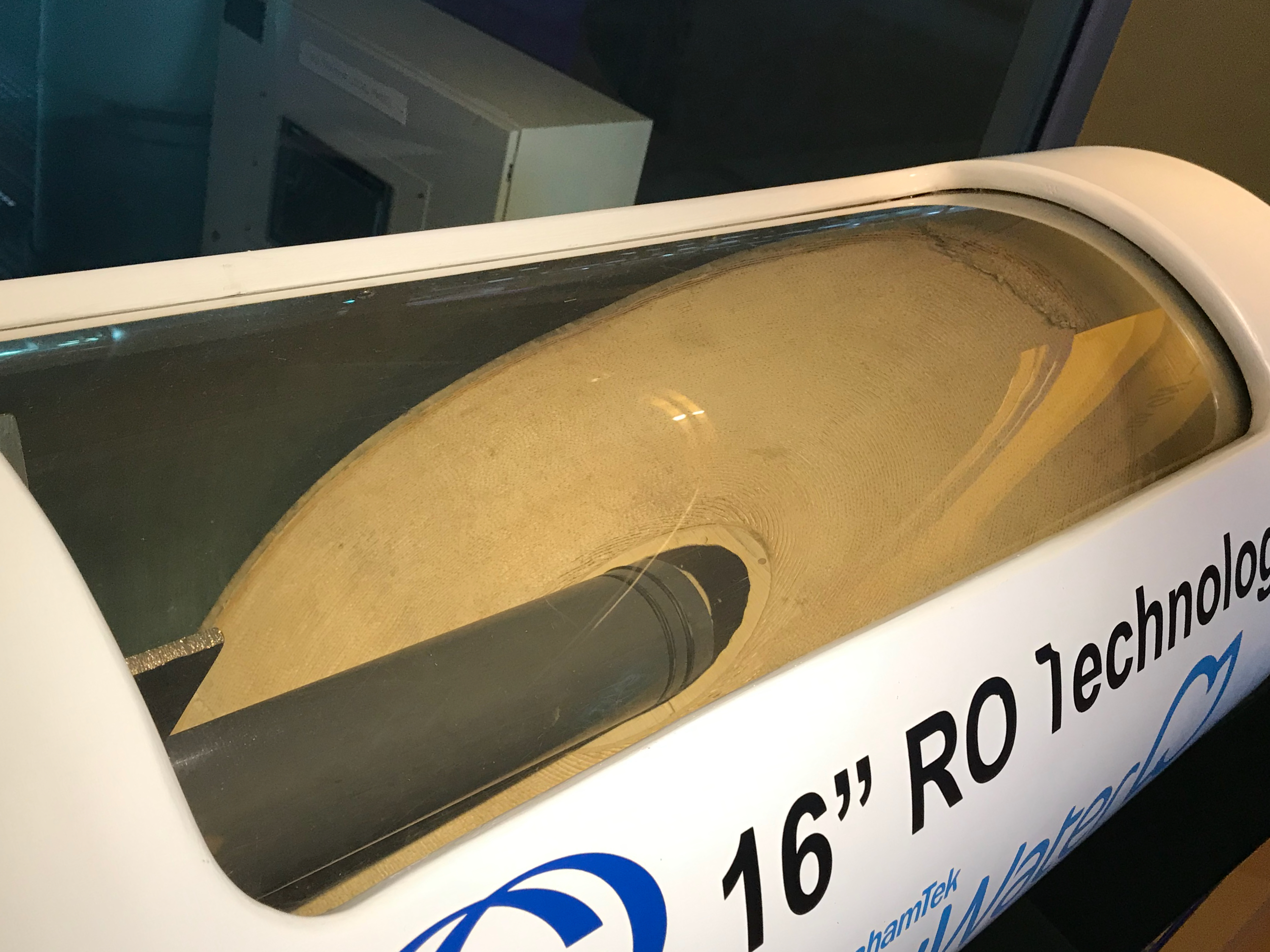
Cutaway of a 16" RO tube

The membrane assembly consists of a pressure vessel with a membrane that allows feedwater to be pushed against it. The membrane must be strong enough to withstand the pressure. RO membranes are made in a variety of configurations. The two most common are spiral-wound and hollow-fiber.

Only part of the water pumped onto the membrane passes through. The left-behind "concentrate" passes along the saline side of the membrane and flushes away the salt and other remnants. The percentage of desalinated water is the "recovery ratio". This varies with salinity and system design parameters: typically 20% for small seawater systems, 40% – 50% for larger seawater systems, and 80% – 85% for brackish water. The concentrate flow is typically 3 bar/50 psi less than the feed pressure, and thus retains much of the input energy.

The desalinated water purity is a function of the feed water salinity, membrane selection and recovery ratio. To achieve higher purity a second pass can be added which generally requires another pumping cycle. Purity expressed as total dissolved solids typically varies from 100 to 400 parts per million (ppm or mg/litre) on a seawater feed. A level of 500 ppm is generally the upper limit for drinking water, while the US Food and Drug Administration classifies mineral water as water containing at least 250 ppm.

=== Energy recovery ===
Schematics of a RO desalination system using a pressure exchanger. 1: Sea water inflow, 2: Fresh water flow (40%), 3: Concentrate flow (60%), 4: Sea water flow (60%), 5: Concentrate (drain), A: Pump flow (40%), B: Circulation pump, C: Osmosis unit with membrane, D: Pressure exchanger

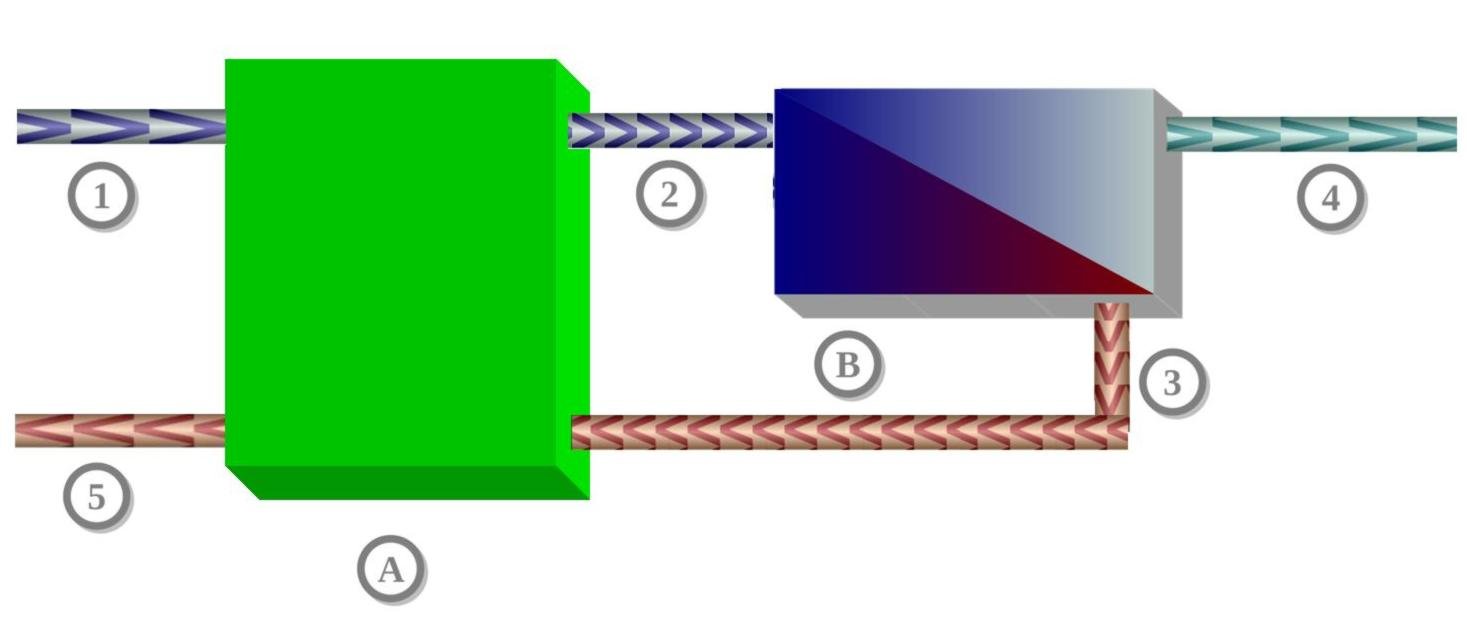
Schematic of a RO desalination system using an energy recovery pump. 1: Sea water inflow (100%, 1 bar), 2: Sea water flow (100%, 50 bar), 3: Concentrate flow (60%, 48 bar), 4: Fresh water flow (40%, 1 bar), 5: Concentrate to drain (60%,1 bar), A: Pressure recovery pump, B: Osmosis unit with membrane

Energy recovery can reduce energy consumption by 50% or more. Much of the input energy can be recovered from the concentrate flow, and the increasing efficiency of energy recovery devices greatly reduces energy requirements. Devices used, in order of invention, are:

- Turbine or Pelton wheel: a water turbine driven by the concentrate flow, connected to the pump drive shaft provides part of the input power. Positive displacement axial piston motors have been used in place of turbines on smaller systems.
- Turbocharger: a water turbine driven by concentrate flow, directly connected to a centrifugal pump that boosts the output pressure, reducing the pressure needed from the pump and thereby its energy input, similar in construction principle to car engine turbochargers.
- Pressure exchanger: using the pressurized concentrate flow, via direct contact or a piston, to pressurize part of the membrane feed flow to near concentrate flow pressure. A boost pump then raises this pressure by typically 3 bar / 50 psi to the membrane feed pressure. This reduces flow needed from the high-pressure pump by an amount equal to the concentrate flow, typically 60%, and thereby its energy input. These are widely used on larger low-energy systems. They are capable of 3 kWh/m^{3} or less energy consumption.
- Energy-recovery pump: a reciprocating piston pump. The pressurized concentrate flow is applied to one side of each piston to help drive the membrane feed flow from the opposite side. These are the simplest energy recovery devices to apply, combining the high pressure pump and energy recovery in a single self-regulating unit. These are widely used on smaller low-energy systems. They are capable of 3 kWh/m^{3} or less energy consumption.
- Batch operation: RO systems run with a fixed volume of fluid (thermodynamically a closed system) do not suffer from wasted energy in the brine stream, as the energy to pressurize a virtually incompressible fluid (water) is negligible. Such systems have the potential to reach second-law efficiencies of 60%. Such systems can be created multiple ways, including using pressurized tanks with pistons or bladders, or low-pressure tanks with conventional ERD's.
- Deep sea RO: This is a continuous process in which RO membranes are placed at deep sea depths inside vessels, so that water pressure generated by gravity is used to drive RO, saving significant amounts of energy by removing the need for high pressure pumps. Freshwater is then pumped to shore under a vacuum created at the shore to reduce head pressure required for freshwater pumping. Energy efficiency of 1.8 kWh/m^{3} can be achieved. However, it is limited to locations where deep sea depths are available close to shore.

=== Remineralisation and pH adjustment ===
The desalinated water is stabilized to protect downstream pipelines and storage, usually by adding lime or caustic soda to prevent corrosion of concrete-lined surfaces. Liming material is used to adjust pH between 6.8 and 8.1 to meet the potable water specifications, primarily for effective disinfection and for corrosion control. Remineralisation may be needed to replace minerals removed from the water by desalination, although this process has proved to be costly and inconvenient in order to meet mineral demand by humans and plants as found in typical freshwater. For instance water from Israel's national water carrier typically contains dissolved magnesium levels of 20 to 25 mg/liter, while water from the Ashkelon plant has no magnesium. Ashkelon water created magnesium-deficiency symptoms in crops, including tomatoes, basil, and flowers, and had to be remedied by fertilization. Israeli drinking water standards require a minimum calcium level of 20 mg/liter. Askelon's post-desalination treatment uses sulfuric acid to dissolve calcite (limestone), resulting in calcium concentrations of 40 to 46 mg/liter, lower than the 45 to 60 mg/liter found in typical Israeli fresh water.

=== Disinfection ===
Post-treatment disinfection provides secondary protection against compromised membranes and downstream problems. Disinfection by means of ultraviolet (UV) lamps (sometimes called germicidal or bactericidal) may be employed to sterilize pathogens that evade the RO process. Chlorination or chloramination (chlorine and ammonia) protects against pathogens that may have lodged in the distribution system downstream.

== Disadvantages ==
Large-scale industrial/municipal systems recover typically 75% to 80% of the feed water, or as high as 90%, because they can generate the required higher pressure.

=== Wastewater ===
Household RO units use a lot of water because they have low back pressure. Household RO water purifiers typically produce one liter of usable water and 3-25 liters of wastewater. The remainder is discharged, usually into the drain. Because wastewater carries the rejected contaminants, recovering this water is not practical for household systems. Wastewater is typically delivered to house drains. A RO unit delivering 20 liters (5.3 U.S. gal) of treated water per day also discharge between 50 and 80 liters (13 and 21 U.S. gal). This led India's National Green Tribunal to propose a ban on RO water purification systems in areas where the total dissolved solids (TDS) measure in water is less than 500 mg/liter. In Delhi, large-scale use of household RO devices has increased the total water demand of the already water-parched National Capital Territory of India.

=== Health ===
RO removes both harmful contaminants and desirable minerals. Some studies report some relation between long-term health effects and consumption of water low on calcium and magnesium, although these studies are of low quality.

=== Waste-stream considerations ===
Depending upon the desired product, either the solvent or solute stream of RO will be waste. For food concentration applications, the concentrated solute stream is the product and the solvent stream is waste. For water treatment applications, the solvent stream is purified water and the solute stream is concentrated waste. The solvent waste stream from food processing may be used as reclaimed water, but there may be fewer options for disposal of a concentrated waste solute stream. Ships may use marine dumping and coastal desalination plants typically use marine outfalls. Landlocked RO plants may require evaporation ponds or injection wells to avoid polluting groundwater or surface runoff.

== Research ==
=== Improving current membranes ===
Current RO membranes, thin-film composite (TFC) polyamide membranes, are being studied to find ways of improving their permeability. Through new imaging methods, researchers were able to make 3D models of membranes and examine how water flowed through them. They found that TFC membranes with areas of low flow significantly decreased water permeability. By ensuring uniformity of the membranes and allowing water to flow continuously without slowing down, membrane permeability could be improved 30–40%.

=== Electrodialysis ===
Research has examined integrating RO with electrodialysis to improve recovery of valuable deionized products, or to reduce concentrate volumes.

=== Low-pressure high-recovery (LPHR) ===
Another approach is low-pressure high-recovery multistage RO (LPHR). It produces concentrated brine and freshwater by cycling the output repeatedly through a relatively porous membrane at relatively low pressure. Each cycle removes additional impurities. Once the output is relatively pure, it is sent through a conventional RO membrane at conventional pressure to complete the filtration step. LPHR was found to be economically feasible, recovering more than 70% with an OPD between 58 and 65 bar and leaving no more than 350 ppm TDS from a seawater feed with 35,000 ppm TDS.

=== Carbon nanotubes (CNTs) ===
Carbon nanotubes are meant to potentially solve the typical tradeoff between the permeability and the selectivity of RO membranes. CNTs present many ideal characteristics including: mechanical strength, electron affinity, and also exhibiting flexibility during modification. By restructuring carbon nanotubes and coating or impregnating them with other chemical compounds, scientists can manufacture these membranes to have all of the most desirable traits. The hope with CNT membranes is to find a combination of high water permeability while also decreasing the amount of neutral solutes taken out of the water. This would help decrease energy costs and the cost of remineralization after purification through the membrane.

=== Graphene ===
Graphene membranes are meant to take advantage of their thinness to increase efficiency. Graphene is a singular layer of carbon atoms, so it is about 1000 times thinner than existing membranes. Graphene membranes are around 100 nm thick while current membranes are about 100 μm. Many researchers were concerned with the durability of graphene and if it would be able to handle RO pressures. New research finds that depending on the substrate (a supporting layer that does no filtration and only provides structural support), graphene membranes can withstand 57MPa of pressure which is about 10 times the typical pressures for seawater RO.

Batch RO may offer increased energy efficiency, more durable equipment and higher salinity limits.

The conventional approach claimed that molecules cross the membrane individually. A research team devised a "solution-friction" theory, claiming that molecules in groups through transient pores. Characterizing that process could guide membrane development. The accepted theory is that individual water molecules diffuse through the membrane, termed the "solution-diffusion" model.

== See also ==
- Electrodeionization
- ERDLator
- Forward osmosis
- Microfiltration
- Reverse osmosis plant
- Silt density index
- Salinity gradient
- Milli-Q water
- Water pollution
- Water quality

== Sources ==
- Metcalf; Eddy (1972). Wastewater Engineering. New York: McGraw-Hill Book Company. ISBN 978-0-070-49539-5.
