= Sidney Loeb =

American-Israeli chemical engineer

- סידני לוב
- Born: Sidney Loeb; 1917; Kansas City, Missouri, U.S.
- Died: December 11, 2008 (aged 91); Omer, Israel
- Education: University of Illinois(B.S.), University of California at Los Angeles (M.Sc., Ph.D.)
- Known for: Reverse Osmosis
- Spouse: Mickey Loeb
- Scientific career
- Fields: Chemical Engineering
- Workplaces: Ben-Gurion University
- Doctoral advisor: Samuel Yuster
- Other academic advisors: Srinivasa Sourirajan

Sidney Loeb (Hebrew: סידני לוב; 1917–2008) was an American-Israeli chemical engineer. Loeb made reverse osmosis (RO) practical by developing, together with Srinivasa Sourirajan, semi-permeable anisotropic membranes. The invention of the practical reverse osmosis membrane revolutionized water desalination. Loeb invented the power generating process pressure retarded osmosis (PRO)--making accessible a rich previously unknown source of green energy, and a method of producing power by a reverse electrodialysis (RED) heat engine, among other inventions in related fields. The production of energy by PRO and RED, among others, is sometimes called "osmotic power."

== Biography ==
Loeb was born in Kansas City, Missouri in 1917. He studied chemical engineering at the University of Illinois, Chicago. Sidney Loeb received his B.S. in chemical engineering from the University of Illinois in 1941. Prior to joining UCLA as a graduate student, he worked in the Los Angeles area in the fields of petrochemicals, rocket engines, and nuclear reactors. He received his M.S. and Ph.D. degrees from UCLA in 1959 and 1964, respectively. It was in the course of his M.Sc. thesis research that the Loeb-Sourirajan membrane breakthrough was achieved.

Loeb's reverse osmosis membrane was first tested in 1965 in Coalinga, California, whose water became unpotable due to the very high presence of minerals; the town received its drinking water supply from deliveries brought in by train from other towns. The membrane successfully purified Coalinga's water. Loeb patented his membrane. Throughout the duration of the patent, Loeb received $14,000 for an invention that led to a multi-billion dollar industry.

In 1967, Loeb came to Beersheva to teach RO technology at the Negev Institute for Arid Zone Research, later incorporated into the Institutes for Applied Research of the Ben-Gurion University of the Negev (BGU). Loeb later accepted a half time teaching and half time research position as Professor of Chemical Engineering at the newly established BGU. For 15 years at BGU, Loeb carried out research and taught membrane processes, desalination, and other subjects. It was at BGU that Loeb invented pressure retarded osmosis and a method of producing power by a reverse electrodialysis heat engine.
