= Membrane fouling =

Fouling of a membrane in different steps 1–5. 1) virgin membrane 2) pore narrowing 3) pore blocking 4) cake layer formation 5) cleaned membrane

Membrane fouling is a process whereby a solution or a particle is deposited on a membrane surface or in membrane pores in a processes such as in a membrane bioreactor, reverse osmosis, forward osmosis, membrane distillation, ultrafiltration, microfiltration, or nanofiltration so that the membrane's performance is degraded. It is a major obstacle to the widespread use of this technology. Membrane fouling can cause severe flux decline and affect the quality of the water produced. Severe fouling may require intense chemical cleaning or membrane replacement. This increases the operating costs of a treatment plant. There are various types of foulants: colloidal (clays, flocs), biological (bacteria, fungi), organic (oils, polyelectrolytes, humics) and scaling (mineral precipitates).

Fouling can be divided into reversible and irreversible fouling based on the attachment strength of particles to the membrane surface. Reversible fouling can be removed by a strong shear force or backwashing. Formation of a strong matrix of fouling layer with the solute during a continuous filtration process will result in reversible fouling being transformed into an irreversible fouling layer. Irreversible fouling is the strong attachment of particles which cannot be removed by physical cleaning.

== Influential factors ==
Factors that affect membrane fouling:

Recent fundamental studies indicate that membrane fouling is influenced by numerous factors such as system hydrodynamics, operating conditions, membrane properties, and material properties (solute). At low pressure, low feed concentration, and high feed velocity, concentration polarisation effects are minimal and flux is almost proportional to trans-membrane pressure difference. However, in the high pressure range, flux becomes almost independent of applied pressure. Deviation from linear flux-pressure relation is due to concentration polarization. At low feed flow rate or with high feed concentration, the limiting flux situation is observed even at relatively low pressures.

== Measurement ==
Flux, transmembrane pressure (TMP), Permeability, and Resistance are the best indicators of membrane fouling. Under constant flux operation, TMP increases to compensate for the fouling. On the other hand, under constant pressure operation, flux declines due to membrane fouling. In some technologies such as membrane distillation, fouling reduces membrane rejection, and thus permeate quality (e.g. as measured by electrical conductivity) is a primary measurement for fouling.

== Fouling control ==
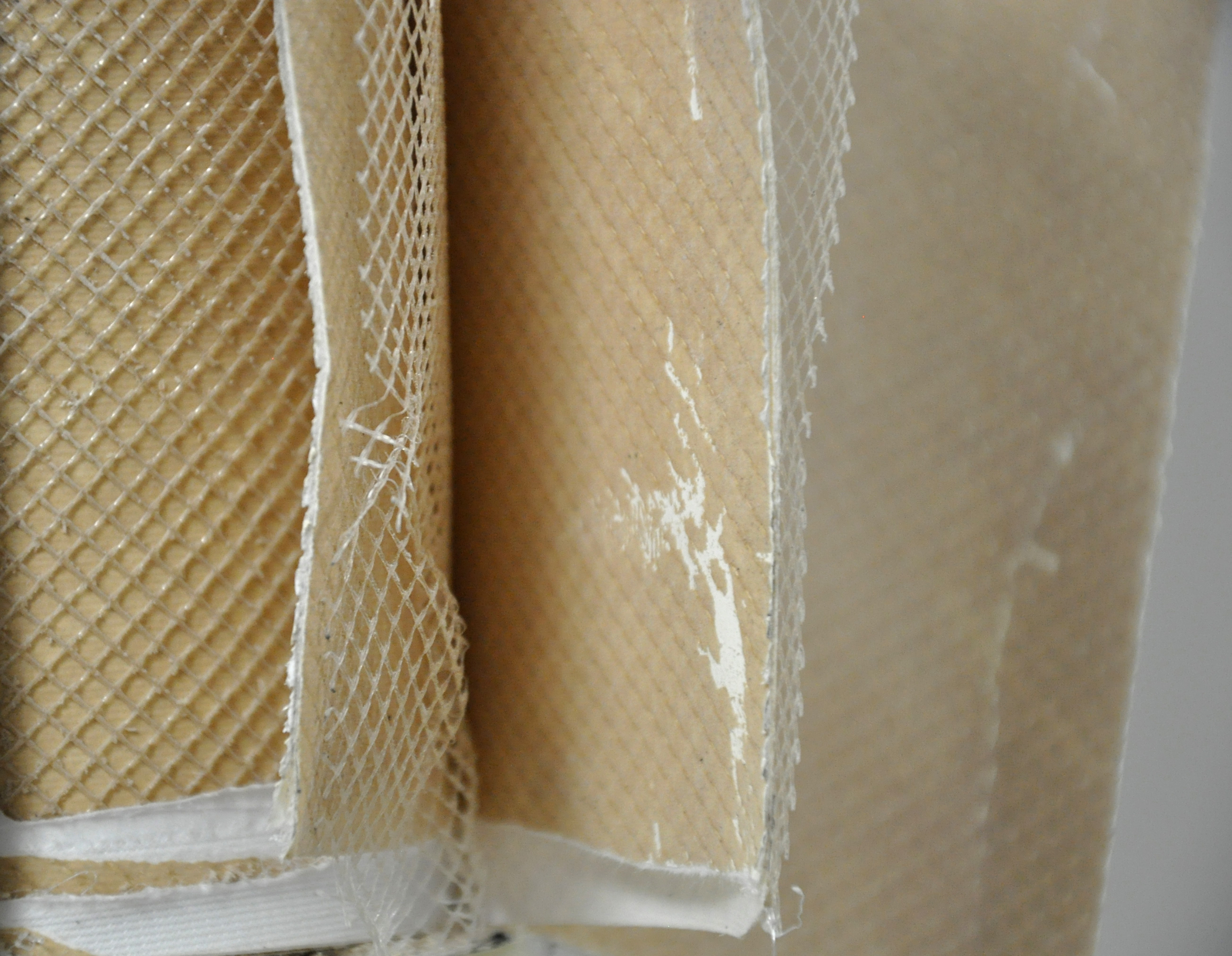
Sediment accumulated on the reverse osmosis membrane.

Even though membrane fouling is an inevitable phenomenon during membrane filtration, it can be minimised by strategies such as cleaning, appropriate membrane selection and choice of operating conditions.

Membranes can be cleaned physically, biologically or chemically. Physical cleaning includes gas scour, sponges, water jets or backflushing using permeate or pressurized air. Biological cleaning uses biocides to remove all viable microorganisms, whereas chemical cleaning involves the use of acids and bases to remove foulants and impurities.

Additionally, researchers have investigated the impact different coatings have on resistance to wear. A 2018 study from the Global Aqua Innovation Center in Japan reported improved surface roughness properties of PA membranes by coating them with multi-walled carbon nanotubes.

Another strategy to minimise membrane fouling is the use of the appropriate membrane for a specific operation. The nature of the feed water must first be known; then a membrane that is less prone to fouling with that solution is chosen. For aqueous filtration, a hydrophilic membrane is preferred. For membrane distillation, a hydrophobic membrane is preferred.

Operating conditions during membrane filtration are also vital, as they may affect fouling conditions during filtration. For instance, crossflow filtration is often preferred to dead end filtration, because turbulence generated during the filtration entails a thinner deposit layer and therefore minimises fouling (e.g. tubular pinch effect). In some applications such as in many MBR applications, air scour is used to promote turbulence at the membrane surface.

== Impact of Fouling on the Mechanical Properties of Membranes ==
Membrane performance can suffer from fouling-induced mechanical degradation. This may result in unwanted pressure and flux gradients, both of the solute and the solvent. The mechanism of membrane failure may be the direct consequence of fouling by means of physical alterations to the membrane, or by indirect means, in which the foulant removal processes yield membrane damage.

=== Direct Impacts of Fouling ===
The majority of membranes used commercially are polymers such as polyvinylidene fluoride (PVDF), polyacrylonitrile (PAN), polyethersulfone (PES) and polyamide (PA), which are materials which offer desirable properties (elasticity and strength) to withstand constant osmotic pressures. The accumulation of foulants, however, degrades these properties through physical alterations to the membrane structure.

The accumulation of foulants can lead to the formation of cracks, surface roughening, and changes in pore size distribution. These physical changes are the result of impacts of hard material with a soft polymer membrane, weakening its structural integrity. Degradation of the mechanical structure makes the membranes more susceptible to mechanical damage, potentially reducing its overall lifespan. A 2006 study observed this degradation by uniaxially straining hollow fibers that were both clean and fouled. The researchers reported the relative embrittlement of the fouled fibers.

=== Indirect Impacts of Fouling ===
Beyond direct physical damage, fouling can also induce indirect effects on membrane mechanical properties due to the strategies used to combat it. Backwashing subjects not only the particulates, but the membrane to strong shear forces. Greater fouling frequency therefore exposes the membrane to cyclic loading which can lead to fatigue failure. This is a process whereby existing imperfections in the membrane (such as microcracks) can grow and propagate due to the complex stress state dynamics. These impacts are not unknown; A 2007 study simulated aging via cyclic backwash pulses, and reported similar embrittlement due to the effects.

Additionally, repeated chemical treatment of fouling subjects membranes to excessive amounts of chlorine or other treatment chemicals which can cause degradation. This chemical degradation can lead to delamination of the membrane components, ultimately leading to failure.

== See also ==
- Vibratory shear-enhanced process
- Water purification
