= Desalting and buffer exchange =

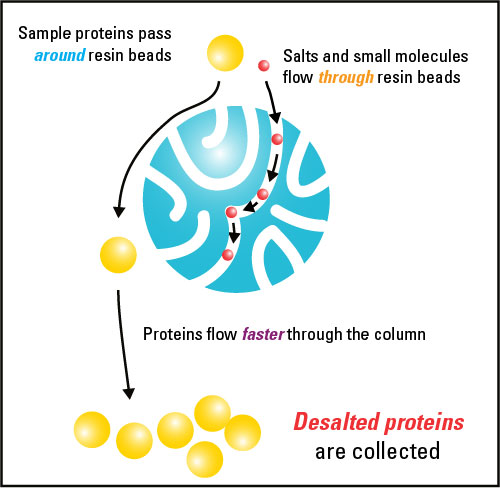
Salts and small molecules can be removed from protein samples by gel filtration chromatography. When added to the column, small molecules have to travel through the extensive pores of the resin beads, while large macromolecules like proteins can't fit and therefore travel around them. This allows the larger molecules to flow through the column at a faster rate than smaller molecules that have to traverse through the resin. Thus, the desalted proteins can be separated and collected.

Desalting and buffer exchange are methods to separate soluble macromolecules from smaller molecules (desalting) or replace the buffer system used for another one suitable for a downstream application (buffer exchange). These methods are based on gel filtration chromatography, also called molecular sieve chromatography, which is a form of size-exclusion chromatography. Desalting and buffer exchange are two of the most common gel filtration chromatography applications, and they can be performed using the same resin.

Desalting and buffer exchange both entail recovering the components of a sample in whatever buffer is used to pre-equilibrate the small, porous polymer beads (resin). Desalting occurs when buffer salts and other small molecules are removed from a sample in exchange for water (with the resin being pre-equilibrated in water). Buffer exchange occurs when the buffer salts in a sample are exchanged for those in another buffer.

== Applications ==
Desalting is used to remove salts from protein solutions, phenol or unincorporated nucleotides from nucleic acids or excess crosslinking or labeling reagents from conjugated proteins. Buffer exchange is used to transfer a protein solution into a buffer system appropriate for downstream applications such as ion exchange, electrophoresis or affinity chromatography.

== Principles of Desalting and Buffer Exchange ==
Size exclusion chromatography applications for separating macromolecules based on subtle differences in size typically use resins with large and varied pore sizes in long chromatography columns. However, for buffer exchange and desalting applications, it is mainly the maximum effective pore size (exclusion limit or molecular weight cut off (MWCO) of the resin) that determines the size of molecules that can be separated. Molecules that are significantly smaller than the MWCO penetrate into the pores of the resin, while molecules larger than the MWCO are unable to enter the pores and remain together in the void volume of the column. By passing samples through a column resin bed with sufficient length and volume, macromolecules can be fully separated from small molecules that travel a greater distance though the pores of the resin bed. No significant separation of molecules larger than the exclusion limit occurs.

In order for the desired macromolecules to remain in the void volume, resins with very small pores sizes must be utilized. For typical desalting and buffer exchange applications choosing a resin with a molecular weight cut off between 5 and 10KDa is usually best. For other applications, such as separating peptides from full-sized proteins, resins with larger exclusion limits may be necessary. The macromolecular components are recovered in the buffer used to pre-equilibrate the gel-filtration matrix, while the small molecules can be collected in a later fraction volume or be left trapped in the resin. One important feature to note when choosing a resin is that the small molecules targeted for removal must be several times smaller than the MWCO for proper separation.

== Desalting and Buffer Exchange vs. Dialysis ==
Dialysis is useful for many of the same desalting and buffer exchange applications performed with gel filtration chromatography, as both methods are based on similar molecular weight cut-off limits. Gel filtration has the advantage of speed (a few minutes vs. hours for dialysis) along with the ability to remove contaminants from relatively small-volume samples compared to dialysis which is an important feature when working with toxic or radioactive substances. Dialysis, on the other hand, is much less dependent on sample size as related to device format. For dialysis applications, achieving a high percentage sample recovery and molecule removal is generally straight forward with little optimization. For gel filtration applications it is important to select a column size and format that is suitable for your sample.

== Gel Filtration Formats for Small Sample Processing ==
There are a number of common formats for performing gel filtration for smaller (less than 4mL) volumes:

- Chromatography columns
- Gravity-flow columns
- Chromatography cartridges
- Centrifuge columns
- Centrifuge plates

Gravity-flow, or drip, columns use head-pressure from a buffer-chase to push the sample through the gel filtration matrix. Sample is loaded into the top of an upright column and allowed to flow into the resin bed. The sample is then chased through the column by adding additional buffer or water to the top of the column. During this process, small fractions are typically collected and each is tested for the macromolecules of interest. In some cases, several fractions might contain the protein and may have to be pooled to improve yield. In order to eliminate the time and monitoring assorted with drip columns, fractions often equal to the full exclusion volume of the column are collected regardless of sample volume resulting in significant dilution of sample.

Sealed chromatography cartridges or columns work similarly except the sample and buffer is pumped into and through the resin by an external device such as a liquid chromatographic (LC) system, also requiring collection and monitoring of several fractions. Even though this method is often semi-automated, using chromatography cartridges is typically limited to processing one sample at a time and some sample dilution from the chase buffer is still likely to occur.

To eliminate sample dilution and the collecting and monitoring of fractions, centrifuge column or plate -based gel filtration, also referred to as spin desalting, methods are commonly used. Spin desalting is unique in that a centrifuge is used to first clear the void volume of liquid in the resin, followed by sample addition and centrifugation. After centrifugation, the macromolecules in the sample have moved through the column in approximately the same initial volume, but the small molecules have been forced into the pores of the resin and replaced by the buffer that was used to pre-equilibrate the gel-filtration matrix. Spin columns and plates eliminate the need to wait for samples to emerge by gravity flow and require no chromatography system, allowing for multiple-sample processing simultaneously.

== Desalting and Buffer Exchange Column and Plate Suppliers ==
Desalting spin columns are widely available with various volumes and MWCO limits:

- Thermo Scientific Pierce Products
- Bio-Rad Laboratories, Inc.
- Cytiva

== External Resources ==
- Animation of desalting using gel filtration chromatography
