= Libre Clothing =

Clothing company

- Industry: Clothing
- Founded: 2008
- Founder: Megan Stengel; Tess Schuster; Mandy Eckman; Bethany Skaff

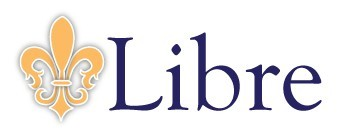
Libre brand logo

Libre Clothing is a clothing line designed for dialysis and chemotherapy patients who lack comfort and warmth during their treatment. The clothing has hidden zipper access points to expose a port or infusion site on the patient's body. The port areas include the arm, upper thigh, or chest. The articles of clothing in which Libre specializes in are comfortable sweaters, sweatshirts, and sweatpants. Libre Clothing has partnered with hospitals, dialysis clinics, and the National Kidney Foundation to help spread awareness of their new innovative product. 5% of all proceeds go towards one of their partner charity organizations. The name Libre was chosen because it means open or free. It refers to both the openings in the clothing and the feeling patients have while wearing the products.

== History ==
Libre Clothing was founded in 2008 by Megan Stengel, Tess Schuster, Mandy Eckman, and Bethany Skaff all of whom had friends or family who had experienced dialysis, chemotherapy, or other infusion treatments. After her mother had to rip holes in her normal clothes in order to stay comfortable and warm during treatments, Stengel created a clothing line that helps dialysis patients feel more comfortable during their treatment. The four co-founders were all students at the Page Center for Entrepreneurship at Miami University when they started the business. In 2009, the first Libre Clothing products were launched.

== See also ==
- Dialysis
- Dialysis tubing
