= Crossflow =

Crossflow may refer to:

- Ford Crossflow, the 1967 version of the Ford Kent engine
- Crossflow cylinder head
- Cross-flow fan, a type of mechanical fan
- Cross-flow filtration, a filtration technique
- Cross-flow turbine, a type of water (or air) turbine
