= Membrane scaling =

Phenomenon in reverse osmosis

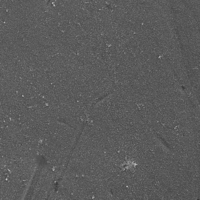
Figure 1: SEM image of a virgin (new) RO membrane that has not been scaled

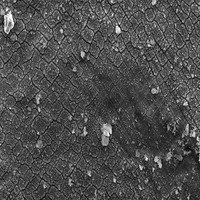
Figure 2: SEM image of a RO membrane that has been scaled

Membrane scaling is when one or more sparingly soluble salts (e.g., calcium carbonate, calcium phosphate, etc.) precipitate and form a dense layer on the membrane surface in reverse osmosis (RO) applications. Figures 1 and 2 show scanning electron microscopy (SEM) images of the RO membrane surface without and with scaling, respectively. Membrane scaling, like other types of membrane fouling, increases energy costs due to higher operating pressure, and reduces permeate water production. Furthermore, scaling may damage and shorten the lifetime of membranes due to frequent membrane cleanings and therefore it is a major operational challenge in RO applications.

Membrane scaling can occur when sparingly soluble salts in RO concentrate become supersaturated, meaning their concentrations exceed their equilibrium (solubility) levels. In RO processes, the increased concentration of sparingly soluble salts in the concentrate is primarily caused by the withdrawal of permeate water from the feedwater. The ratio of permeate water to feedwater is known as recovery which is directly related to membrane scaling. Recovery needs to be as high as possible in RO installations to minimize specific energy consumption. However, at high recovery rates, the concentration of sparingly soluble salts in the concentrate can increase dramatically. For example, for 80% and 90% recovery, the concentration of salts in the concentrate can reach 5 and 10 times their concentration in the feedwater, respectively. If the calcium and phosphate concentrations in the RO feedwater are 200 mg/L and 5 mg/L, respectively, the concentrations in the RO concentrate will be 1000 mg/L and 50 mg/L at 90% recovery, exceeding the calcium phosphate solubility limit and resulting in calcium phosphate scaling.

Membrane scaling is not only dependent on supersaturation but also on crystallization kinetics, i.e., nucleation and crystal growth.

== Scaling compounds encountered in RO ==
The most common salts that cause scaling in RO processes are:

- Calcium carbonate
- Calcium sulfate
- Silica/metal silicates
- Barium sulfate
- Calcium phosphate

== Scaling prediction methods ==
There are a number of indices available to determine the scaling tendency of sparingly soluble salts in a water solution. These indices provide information if a given scale-forming specie is undersaturated, saturated, or supersaturated. Scaling does not occur when a compound is undersaturated, while it will take place sooner or later when a compound is supersaturated.

The most commonly used indices to predict scaling in RO applications are:

- Saturation index (SI)

$SI = \log\frac{IAP}{K_{sp}}$

where, IAP and K_{sp} are ion activity product and solubility product of the sparingly soluble salt, respectively. For instance, SI for calcium sulphate can be calculated as follows:

$SI = \log\frac{\gamma[Ca^{2+}]\gamma[SO_4^{2-}]}{Ksp}$

where, γ is activity coefficient. [Ca^{2+}] and [SO_{4}^{2−}] are calcium and sulphate concentrations in mol/L, respectively.

- Supersaturation ratio (S_{r})

$S_r = \surd\frac{IAP}{K_{sp}}$

where IAP and Ksp are ion activity product and solubility product of the sparingly soluble salt, respectively. For instance, S_{r} for calcium sulphate can be calculated as follows:

$S_r = \surd\frac{\gamma[Ca^{2+}]\gamma[SO_4^{2-}]}{Ksp}$

where, γ is activity coefficient. [Ca^{2+}] and [SO_{4}^{2−}] are calcium and sulphate concentrations in mol/L, respectively.

- Langelier saturation index (LSI)

LSI is used only for calcium carbonate scaling. On the other hand, SI and S_{r} are applicable for all compounds.

A positive value for each SI and LSI indicates that scaling may occur in RO, whereas a negative value implies that scaling will not occur. Similarly, scaling may occur when S_{r}>1, but not when S_{r}<1.

== Scaling control in RO applications ==
There are several methods for preventing scaling in RO applications, including acidification of RO feed, lowering RO system recovery, and antiscalant addition. Acidification of RO feedwater was one of the first methods for tackling calcium carbonate scaling in RO processes. However, due to the risks associated with the use of acid, this method is becoming less common. Furthermore, acidification may not be effective for all types of scales; for example, it is very effective in preventing calcium carbonate scaling but not calcium sulphate scaling.

Another method of preventing scaling is to operate RO at low recovery (ratio of permeate water to the feedwater). The recovery of the RO application is reduced in this approach to reduce the supersaturation level of the concentrate water to undersaturated conditions. Low recovery reduces the adverse effect of concentration polarization because there is less solute concentration on the membrane surface, reducing the potential for scale formation. This approach, however, is not very appealing or economical because it results in high specific energy consumption. Furthermore, the large amount of concentrate disposal is a problem.

Antiscalants addition to the RO feed is one of the most widely applied strategies in term of scale control. Antiscalants can be used to increase the recovery of RO process and are primarily contains organic compounds such as sulphonate, phosphonate, or carboxylic acid functional groups. The addition of antiscalants hinder the crystallization process, i.e., nucleation and/or growth phase of scaling compounds. Antiscalant prevent scale formation by three mechanisms, namely threshold inhibition, crystal modification and dispersion. Threshold inhibition is when antiscalant molecules adsorb on crystal nuclei and halt their nucleation process, whereas crystal modification and dispersion are the ability of antiscalants to stop the growth and/or agglomeration of crystals and particles. For silica scale, there is also an additional function where it prevents polymerisation of silica monomers, hence preventing the growth of silica polymers. There are various commercial antiscalants on the market such as Kurita, Avista, BASF etc. In RO applications, antiscalants are chosen based on the composition of the feedwater, and their doses are usually calculated using computer programs created by antiscalant manufacturers. For example, Avista has a chemical dosing software called AdvisorCI™, that is used to compute accurate dosing of chemicals in RO systems.
