= Nanofilter Tanzania =

NanoFilter is the water filter developed as the result of innovation by the Tanzanian senior-lecturer and chemical engineer, Dr. Askwar Hilonga from The Nelson Mandela African Institution of Science and Technology (NM-AIST)- Arusha in Tanzania. After spending almost five years from 2010 to continue refining the nanomaterials to the nanoFilter. It was very difficult to come up to final water filter with this idea as it was too difficult to protect it in all these years. But Dr. Hilonga used the appropriate Intellectual property Rights (IPRs) strategy to protect this idea up to the end, and in fact the product of this innovation worn the Africa Prize for Engineering Innovation, this is especially the lesson to young scientists in developing countries.

== NanoFilter Innovation ==
As Dr. Askwar Hilonga grew up in the remote area as the party of community, he witnessed sufferings experienced majority of people in the villages in Tanzania and probably this is the common problem to all the poorest countries in the world. Problems like water borne diseases real kill people everyday due to the use of unsafe water.

Nevertheless, especially in the northern part of the beautiful country of Tanzania. The water which normal people use seem to contain fluoride while bacteria remain the content of water in most of the villages in the developing countries.

The nanoFilter idea resulted from the visit this African Scientist made to his parents' village found in Arusha where people were still drinking dirty water which scares him, that his people were going to continue suffering from water-borne disease.

== How the NanoFilter works ==
It has a slow sand filter with a combination of nanomaterials made from sodium silicate and silver to eliminate toxic heavy metals such as copper, fluoride, or other chemical contaminants depending on a particular geographical area. Water first passes through the sand and then through the nanomaterials.

It then absorbs all the contaminants leaving water very clean and safe and can later be removed manually.

== Conclusion ==
NanoFilter is the filter which can filtrate water for about 99.999% and making water free from bacteria, microorganisms, and Viruses hence making the drinking water safe for the domestic usage.
