= Electrodiffusiophoresis =

Electrodiffusiophoresis is a motion of particles dispersed in liquid induced by external homogeneous electric field, which makes it similar to electrophoresis.

== Overview ==
In contradistinction with electrophoresis, motion of particle in homogeneous electric field only, electrodiffusiophoresis occurs in the areas of the dispersion that experience concentration polarization due to, for instance, electrochemical reactions, see electrochemistry. These are areas in vicinity of electrodes or ion selective membranes. There are concentration gradients in such areas that affect particles motion strongly. First of all, they create inhomogeneity in the electric field. Secondly, they cause diffusiophoresis. This peculiarities of the particles motion in the areas subjected to the concentration polarization justifies introduction of the special term for this electrokinetic effect - electrodiffusiophoresis.

One of the most important differences of the electrodiffusioporesis from the electrophoresis is that exists as directed particles drift in the alternating electric field. Electrophoresis, in contrary, causes only particles oscillation on the same spot. This difference opens opportunities for important applications. Electrodiffusiophoresis was theoretically predicted by Dukhin and Malkin in 1980 - 82.

It was experimentally observed microscopically in 1982.

The first application of this effect was explanation of particles depositing at some distance from the surface of the ion selective membrane.

These earlier experiments and theory were described in the review published in 1990. This review presents also application of electrodiffusiophoresis for making bactericidal coatings.

This effect has attracted new attention in 2010 with regard to microfluidics.

There are more studies of this effect reviewed in the Elsevier book published in 2025. This effect was rediscovered 40 years later by a group led by Batista and his co-workers. They converted EDF into a powerful tool for studying the motion of particles and assembly in liquids in AC electric field.

== See also ==
- Interface and colloid science
