= Tilting pan filter =

Equipment used in solid-liquid chemical filtration

A tilting pan filter is a chemical equipment used in continuous solid-liquid filtration.

Schematic drawing of a tilting pan filter.

It is formed by a number of trapezoidal pans arranged in circle. At the center of the equipment there is the main valve which is connected to every pan through pipes. The pans are rotating continuously around the main valve, which provides the air or the vacuum necessary for the operation. In each pan it is carried out the filtration in a cyclic process that involves these stages:

- feed is poured in the pan; the material to be filtered formed in this way a "cake";
- cake is washed out;
- cake is dried through the aspiration of the liquid;
- cake is washed out again;
- cake is dried again;
- pan is tilted in order to discharge the solid;
- pan is sprayed with water to be cleaned;
- pan is tilted back to the initial angle and the process continues with the feeding stage.

== See also ==
- Filtration
- Filter cake
