= Dialysis (chemistry) =

Process of separating molecules

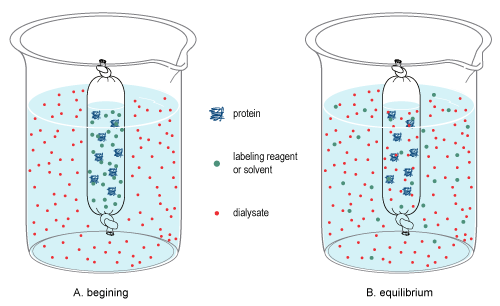
Small-molecule dialysis using dialysis tubing

In chemistry, dialysis is the process of separating molecules in solution by the difference in their rates of diffusion through a semipermeable membrane, such as dialysis tubing.

Dialysis is a common laboratory technique that operates on the same principle as medical dialysis. In the context of life science research, the most common application of dialysis is for the removal of unwanted small molecules such as salts, reducing agents, or dyes from larger macromolecules such as proteins, DNA, or polysaccharides. Dialysis is also commonly used for buffer exchange and drug binding studies.

The concept of dialysis was introduced in 1861 by the Scottish chemist Thomas Graham. He used this technique to separate sucrose (small molecule) and gum Arabic solutes (large molecule) in aqueous solution. He called the diffusible solutes crystalloids and those that would not pass the membrane colloids.

From this concept dialysis can be defined as a spontaneous separation process of suspended colloidal particles from dissolved ions or molecules of small dimensions through a semi permeable membrane. Most common dialysis membrane are made of cellulose, modified cellulose or synthetic polymer (cellulose acetate or nitrocellulose).

== Etymology ==
Dialysis derives from the Greek διά, 'through', and λύειν, 'to loosen'.

== Principles ==
Dialysis is the process used to change the matrix of molecules in a sample by differentiating molecules by the classification of size. It relies on diffusion, which is the random, thermal movement of molecules in solution (Brownian motion) that leads to the net movement of molecules from an area of higher concentration to a lower concentration until equilibrium is reached. Due to the pore size of the membrane, large molecules in the sample cannot pass through the membrane, thereby restricting their diffusion from the sample chamber. By contrast, small molecules will freely diffuse across the membrane and obtain equilibrium across the entire solution volume, thereby changing the overall concentration of these molecules in the sample and dialysate (see dialysis figure at right).

Osmosis is another principle that makes dialysis work. During osmosis, fluid moves from areas of high water concentration to lower water concentration across a semi-permeable membrane until equilibrium. In dialysis, excess fluid moves from sample to the dialysate through a membrane until the fluid level is the same between sample and dialysate.

Finally, ultrafiltration is the convective flow of water and dissolved solute down a pressure gradient caused by hydrostatic forces or osmotic forces. In dialysis, ultrafiltration removes molecules of waste and excess fluids from sample.

For example, dialysis occurs when a sample contained in a cellulose bag and is immersed into a dialysate solution. During dialysis, equilibrium is achieved between the sample and dialysate since only small molecules can pass the cellulose membrane, leaving only larger particles behind.

Once equilibrium is reached, the final concentration of molecules is dependent on the volumes of the solutions involved, and if the equilibrated dialysate is replaced (or exchanged) with fresh dialysate (see procedure below), diffusion will further reduce the concentration of the small molecules in the sample.

Dialysis can be used to either introduce or remove small molecules from a sample, because small molecules move freely across the membrane in both directions. Dialysis can also be used to remove salts. This makes dialysis a useful technique for a variety of applications. See dialysis tubing for additional information on the history, properties, and manufacturing of semipermeable membranes used for dialysis.

== Types ==
=== Diffusion dialysis ===
Diffusion dialysis is a spontaneous separation process where the driving force which produces the separation is the concentration gradient. It has an increase in entropy and decrease in Gibbs free energy which means that it is thermodynamically favorable. Diffusion dialysis uses anion exchange membranes (AEM) or cation exchange membranes (CEM) depending on the compounds to separate. AEM allows the passage of anions while it obstructs the passage of cations due to the co-ion rejection and preservation of electrical neutrality. The opposite happens with cation exchange membranes.

=== Electrodialysis ===
Electrodialysis is a process of separation which uses ion-exchange membranes and an electrical potential as a driving force. It is mainly used to remove ions from aqueous solutions. There are three electrodialysis processes which are commonly used - Donnan dialysis, reverse electrodialysis, and electro-electrodialysis. These processes are explained below.

==== Donnan dialysis ====
Donnan dialysis is a separation process which is used to exchange ions between two aqueous solutions which are separated by a CEM or an AEM membrane. In the case of a cation exchange membrane separating two solutions with different acidity, protons (H^{+}) go through the membrane to the less acidic side. This induces an electrical potential that will instigate a flux of the cations present in the less acidic side to the more acidic side. The process will finish when the variation of concentration of H^{+} is the same order of magnitude as the difference of concentration of the separated cation.

==== Reverse electrodialysis ====
Reverse electrodialysis is a technology based on membranes which gets electricity from a mixing of two water streams with different salinities. It commonly uses anion exchange membranes (AEM) and cation exchange membranes (CEM). AEMs are used to allow the pass of anions and obstruct the pass of cations and CEMs are used to do the opposite. The cations and anions in the high salinity water moves to the low salinity water, cations passing through the CEMs and anions through the AEMs. This phenomenon can be converted to electricity.

==== Electro-electrodialysis ====
Electro-electrodialysis is an electromembrane process utilizing three compartments, which combines electrodialysis and electrolysis. It is commonly used to recover acid from a solution using AEM, CEM and electrolysis. The three compartments are separated by two barriers, which are the ion exchange membranes. The compartment in the middle has the water to be treated. The compartments located on the sides contain clean water. The anions pass through the AEM, while the cations pass through the CEM. The electricity creates H^{+} in the anions' side and OH^{−} in the cations' side, which react with the respective ions.

== Procedure ==
=== Equipment ===
Separating molecules in a solution by dialysis is a relatively straightforward process. Other than the sample and dialysate buffer, all that is typically needed is:

- Dialysis membrane in an appropriate format (e.g., tubing, cassette, etc.) and molecular weight cut-off (MWCO)
- A container to hold the dialysate buffer
- The ability to stir the solutions and control the temperature

=== General protocol ===
A typical dialysis procedure for protein samples is as follows:

1. Prepare the membrane according to instructions
2. Load the sample into dialysis tubing, cassette or device
3. Place sample into an external chamber of dialysis buffer (with gentle stirring of the buffer)
4. Dialyze for 2 hours (at room temperature or 4 °C)
5. Change the dialysis buffer and dialyze for another 2 hours
6. Change the dialysis buffer and dialyze for 2 hours or overnight

The total volume of sample and dialysate determine the final equilibrium concentration of the small molecules on both sides of the membrane. By using the appropriate volume of dialysate and multiple exchanges of the buffer, the concentration of small contaminants within the sample can be decreased to acceptable or negligible levels. For example, when dialyzing 1mL of sample against 200mL of dialysate, the concentration of unwanted dialyzable substances will be decreased 200-fold when equilibrium is attained. Following two additional buffer changes of 200mL each, the contaminant level in the sample will be reduced by a factor of 8 million (200 x 200 x 200).

=== Variables and protocol optimization ===
Although dialyzing a sample is relatively simple, a universal dialysis procedure for all applications cannot be provided due to the following variables:

- The sample volume
- The size of the molecules being separated
- The membrane used
- The geometry of the membrane, which affects the diffusion distance

Additionally, the dialysis endpoint is somewhat subjective and application specific. Therefore, the general procedure might require optimization.

== Dialysis membranes and MWCO ==
Dialysis membranes are produced and characterized according to molecular-weight cutoff (MWCO) limits. While membranes with MWCOs ranging from 1-1,000,000 kDa are commercially available, membranes with MWCOs near 10 kDa are most commonly used. The MWCO of a membrane is the result of the number and average size of the pores created during production of the dialysis membrane. The MWCO typically refers to the smallest average molecular mass of a standard molecule that will not effectively diffuse across the membrane during extended dialysis. Thus, a dialysis membrane with a 10K MWCO will generally retain greater than 90% of a protein having a molecular mass of at least 10kDa.

The MWCO of a membrane is not a sharply defined value. Molecules with mass near the MWCO limit of the membrane will diffuse across the membrane more slowly than molecules significantly smaller than the MWCO. In order for a molecule to rapidly diffuse across a membrane, it typically needs to be at least 20- to 50-times smaller than the MWCO rating of a membrane. Therefore, it is not practical to separate a 30kDa protein from a 10kDa protein using dialysis across a 20K rated dialysis membrane.

Dialysis membranes for laboratory use are typically made of a film of regenerated cellulose or cellulose esters. See reference for a review of cellulose membranes and manufacturing.

== Laboratory dialysis formats ==
Dialysis is generally performed in clipped bags of dialysis tubing or in a variety of formatted dialyzers. The choice of the dialysis set up used is largely dependent on the size of the sample and the preference of the user. Dialysis tubing is the oldest and generally the least expensive format used for dialysis in the lab. Tubing is cut and sealed with a clip at one end, then filled and sealed with a clip on the other end. Tubing provides flexibility but has increased concerns regarding handling, sealing and sample recovery. Dialysis tubing is typically supplied either wet or dry in rolls or pleated telescoped tubes.

A wide variety of dialysis devices (or dialyzers) are available from several vendors. Dialyzers are designed for specific sample volume ranges and provide greater sample security and improved ease of use and performance for dialysis experiments over tubing. The most common preformatted dialyzers are Slide-A-Lyzer, Float-A-Lyzer, and the Pur-A-lyzer/D-Tube/GeBAflex Dialyzers product lines.

== Applications ==
Dialysis has a wide range of applications. These can be divided into two categories depending on the type of dialysis used.

=== Diffusion dialysis ===
Some applications of the diffusion dialysis are explained below.

- Strong aqueous caustic soda solutions can be purified of hemicellulose by diffusion dialysis. This is specific to the largely-obsolete viscose process. The first step in that process is to treat almost-pure cellulose (cotton linters or dissolving pulp) with strong (17-20% w/w) solutions of sodium hydroxide (caustic soda) in water. One effect of that step is to dissolve the hemicelluloses (low-MW polymers). In some circumstances, it is desirable to remove as much hemicellulose as possible out of the process, and that can be done using dialysis.
- Acids can be recovered from aqueous solutions using anion-exchange membranes. That process is an alternative treatment of industrial wastewater. It is used for the recovery of mixed acid (HF+ HNO_{3}), the recovery and concentration of Zn^{2+} and Cu^{2+}, in H_{2}SO_{4}+ CuSO_{4} and H_{2}SO_{4}+ ZnSO_{4} and the recovery of H_{2}SO_{4} from waste sulphuric acid solutions containing Fe and Ni ions, which are produced at the diamond manufacturing process.
- Alkali waste can be recovered using diffusion dialysis because of its low energy cost. The NaOH base can be recovered from the aluminium etching solution applying a technique develop by Astom Corporation of Japan.
- De-alcoholisation of beer is another application of the diffusion dialysis. Taking into account that a concentration gradient is applied for this technique, the alcohol and other small molecule compounds transfer across the membrane from higher concentrations to lower, which is water. It is used for this application for the low operation conditions and the possibility to remove alcohol to 0.5%.

=== Electrodialysis ===
Some applications of the electrodialysis are explained below.

- The desalination of whey is the largest area of use for this type of dialysis in the food industry. It is necessary to remove crude cheese whey containing calcium, phosphorus and other inorganic salts to produce different foods such as cake, bread, ice cream and baby foods. The limit of whey demineralisation is almost 90%.
- De-acidification of fruit juice such as grape, orange, apple and lemon are processes in which electrodialysis is applied. An anion-exchange membrane is employed in this technique implying that citrate ions from the juice are extracted and replaced by hydroxide ions.
- Desalting of soy sauce can be done by electrodialysis. The conventional values of salt in brewed soy sauce are about 16-18 %, which is a quite high content. Electrodialysis is used to reduce the amount of salt present in the soy sauce. Nowadays diets of low salt content are very present in the society.
- Electrodialysis allows the separation of amino acids into acidic, basic and neutral groups. Specifically, cytoplasmic leaf proteins are extracted from alfalfa leaves applying electrodialysis. When proteins are denatured, the solutions can be desalted (of K^{+} ions) and acidified with H^{+} ions.

== Advantages and disadvantages ==
Dialysis has both advantages and disadvantages. Following the structure of the previous section, the pros and cons are discussed based on the type of dialysis used. Advantages and drawbacks of both, diffusion dialysis and electrodialysis, are outlined below.

=== Diffusion dialysis ===
The main advantage of diffusion dialysis is the low energy consumption of the unit. This membrane technique operates under normal pressure and does not have a state change. Consequently, the energy required is significantly reduced, which reduces the operating cost. There is also the low installation cost, easy operation and the stability and reliability of the process. Another advantage is that diffusion dialysis does not pollute the environment.

A disadvantage is that a diffusion dialyser has a low processing capability and low processing efficiency. There are other methods such as electrodialysis and reverse osmosis that can achieve better efficiencies than diffusion dialysis.

=== Electrodialysis ===
The main benefit of electrodialysis is the high recovery, especially in the water recovery. Another advantage is the fact that not high pressure is applied which implies that the effect fouling is not significant and consequently no chemicals are required to fight against them. Moreover, the fouling layer is not compact which leads to a higher recovery and to a long membrane life. It is also important that the treatments are for concentrations higher than 70,000 ppm eliminating the concentration limit. Finally, the energy required to operate is low due to the non-phase change. In fact, it is lower in comparison with the needed in the multi effect distillation (MED) and mechanical vapour compression (MVC) processes.

The main drawback of electrodialysis is the current density limit, the process must be operated at a lower current density than the maximum allowed. The fact is that at certain voltage applied the diffusion of ions through the membrane are not linear leading to water dissociation, which would reduce the efficiency of the operation. Another aspect to take into account is that although low energy is required to operate, the higher the salt feed concentration is, the higher the energy needed will be. Finally, in the case of some products, it must be considered that electrodialysis does not remove microorganisms and organic contaminants, therefore a post-treatment is necessary.

== See also ==
- Electrodialysis
- Haemodialysis
- Microdialysis
- Osmosis
- Peritoneal dialysis
- AutoAnalyzer
