= Dialysis tubing =

Membrane tubing

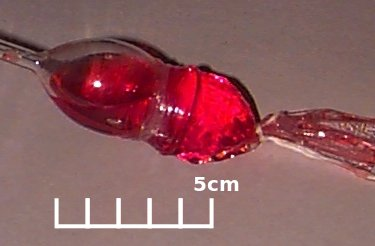
Dialysis tubing

Dialysis tubing, also known as Visking tubing, is an artificial semi-permeable membrane tubing used in separation techniques, that facilitates the flow of tiny molecules in solution based on differential diffusion. In the context of life science research, dialysis tubing is typically used in the sample clean-up and processing of proteins and DNA samples or complex biological samples such as blood or serums. Dialysis tubing is also frequently used as a teaching aid to demonstrate the principles of diffusion, osmosis, Brownian motion and the movement of molecules across a restrictive membrane. For the principles and usage of dialysis in a research setting, see Dialysis (chemistry).

== History, properties and composition ==
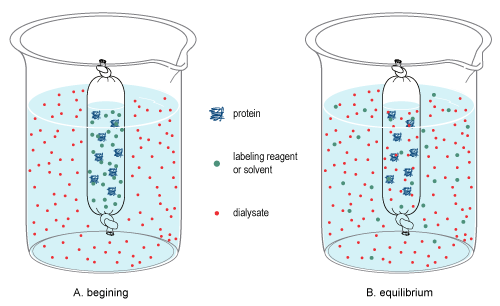
Small-molecule dialysis using dialysis tubing

Dialysis occurs throughout nature and the principles of dialysis have been exploited by humans for thousands of years using natural animal or plant-based membranes. The term dialysis was first routinely used for scientific or medical purposes in the late 1800s and early 1900s, pioneered by the work of Thomas Graham. The first mass-produced man-made membranes suitable for dialysis were not available until the 1930s, based on materials used in the food packaging industry such as cellophane. In the 1940s, Willem Kolff constructed the first dialyzer (artificial kidney), and successfully treated patients with kidney failure using dialysis across semi-permeable membranes. Today, dialysis tubing for laboratory applications comes in a variety of dimensions and molecular-weight cutoffs (MWCO). In addition to tubing, dialysis membranes are also found in a wide range of different preformatted devices, significantly improving the performance and ease of use of dialysis.

Different dialysis tubing or flat membranes are produced and characterized as differing molecular-weight cutoffs (MWCO) ranging from 1–1,000,000 kDa. The MWCO determination is the result of the number and average size of the pores created during the production of the dialysis membrane. The MWCO typically refers to the smallest average molecular mass of a standard molecule that will not effectively diffuse across the membrane upon extended dialysis. Thus, a dialysis membrane with a 10K MWCO will generally retain >90% of a protein having a molecular mass of at least 10 kDa. Pore sizes typically range from ~10–100 Angstroms for 1K to 50K MWCO membranes.

The MWCO of a membrane is not a sharply defined value. Molecules with mass near the MWCO of the membrane will diffuse across the membrane slower than molecules significantly smaller than the MWCO. In order for a molecule to rapidly diffuse across a membrane, it typically needs to be at least 20–50 times smaller than the membranes MWCO rating. Therefore, it is not practical to try separating a 30kDa protein from a 10kDa protein using dialysis across a 20K rated dialysis membrane. Dialysis tubing for laboratory use is typically made of a film of regenerated cellulose or cellulose ester. However; dialysis membranes made of polysulfone, polyethersulfone (PES), etched polycarbonate, or collagen are also extensively used for specific medical, food, or water treatment applications.

== Manufacturing ==
Membranes, composed of either regenerated cellulose or cellulose esters, are manufactured through distinct processes of modifying and cross-linking cellulose fibers (derived from wood pulp or cotton fibers) to form films with differing properties and pore sizes. Variations in the manufacturing process significantly change the properties and pore sizes of the films; depending on the cross-linkages introduced in cellulose, the size of pores can be modulated. While similar in composition, most of the cellulose-based membranes currently manufactured are not necessarily useful for dialysis. Cellulose-based membranes are also widely used for applications ranging from food wrapping, film stock, or “plastic” wrap.

For dialysis applications, regenerated cellulose-based membranes are extruded as tubing or sheets and then dried. Glycerol is frequently added as a humectant to prevent cracking during drying and to help maintain the desired pore structure. Regenerated cellulose membranes are very hydrophilic and hydrate rapidly when introduced to water. Due to their additional crosslinking, regenerated cellulose membranes have better chemical compatibility and heat stability than membranes made from cellulose esters. Regenerated cellulose membranes are more resistant to organic solvents and to the weak or dilute acids and bases that are commonly used in protein and molecular biology applications. Membranes based on cellulose esters are typically supplied wet and come in a greater range of MWCOs. Pore sizes are typically more consistent across cellulose acetate membranes.
