= Mercury nano-trap water filtration =

Method of eliminating pollution

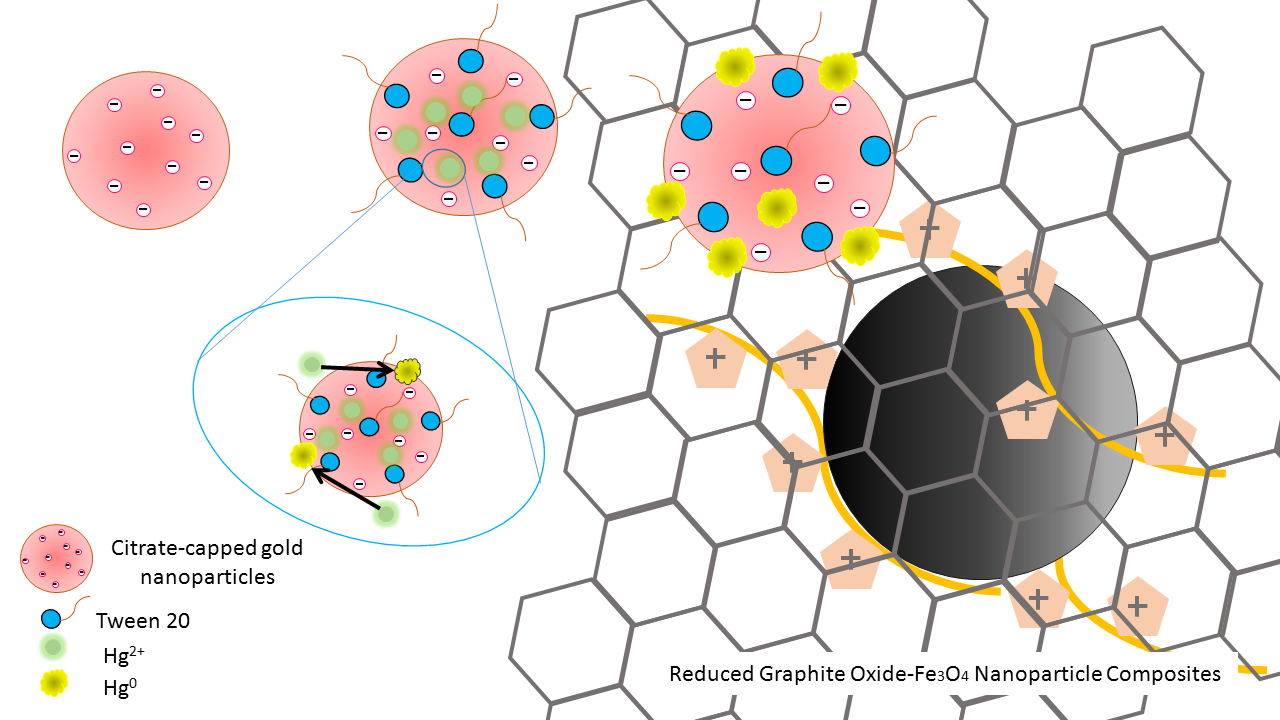
Figure 1:The citrate-capped gold nanoparticles (NPs) adsorbed on the surface of the Tween 20-Au NPs reduced Hg^{2+} to Hg^{0}, resulting in the deposition of Hg^{0} on the surface of the NPs. The Hg0-containing gold NPs were collected using reduced graphite oxide−Fe_{3}O_{4} NPs composites.

Mercury nano-trap water filtration is a method of decontaminating water of mercury. Mercury is one of the most notorious metal pollutants present in food, water, air and soil, but the process of eliminating it is limited. Heavy metals such as mercury are formed on the Earth's crust and made into solutions with ground water through certain natural processing and pH changes occurring in the soil. There are traditional methods that are used to extract mercury from the natural water sources and industrial waste water, such as chemical precipitation, amalgamation, reverse osmosis, membrane filtration and photochemical methods. However, these methods are expensive, time-consuming, and inefficient, hence the need for a nanofiltration technology that overcomes all of these issues. Nanofiltration technology is very efficient in removal of mercury species due to its characteristics of having high surface area-to-volume and the fact that it is easily chemically functionalized. Additionally, Brownian motion of nanomaterials allows them to scan large volume of solvent in short times. There are many copolymer nanoparticles (NPs) that can be used as scavengers to eliminate mercury species via redox reactions such as selenium NPs, manganese dioxide nanowhiskers, carbon nanotube−silverNP composites, silver NPs, silver NP-decorated silicaspheres, gold NP-based materials. Among these adsorbents, citrate-capped gold NP-based materials have been used intensively to capture mercury species from nature water.

== Instrumentation ==
High-resolution transmission electron microscopy (HRTEM) is used to obtain the HRTEM images (FEI Tecnai G2 F20 S-Twin working at 200 kV) and double beam UV-visible spectrophotometer is used for the extinction, or removal, of the NPs gold spectra. A combination of scanning electron microscope and an energy dispersive X-ray detector (EDX) for obtaining EDX spectra while sub micrometer particle size analyzer and Delsa nano zeta potential measure the potential of gold NPs. Inductively coupled plasma-mass spectrometry (ICP-MS) measures the quantification of mercury species in gold NPs while the linear range of Hg2+ should be between 2.5 and 50 nM. The powder X-ray diffraction is measured using a diffractometer with Cu Kα radiation. A superconducting quantum interference device measures the magnetometry while the Fourier-transformed infrared spectroscopy spectrum is measured by a Nicolet 6700 FT-IR spectrometer.

== Removal of mercury species ==
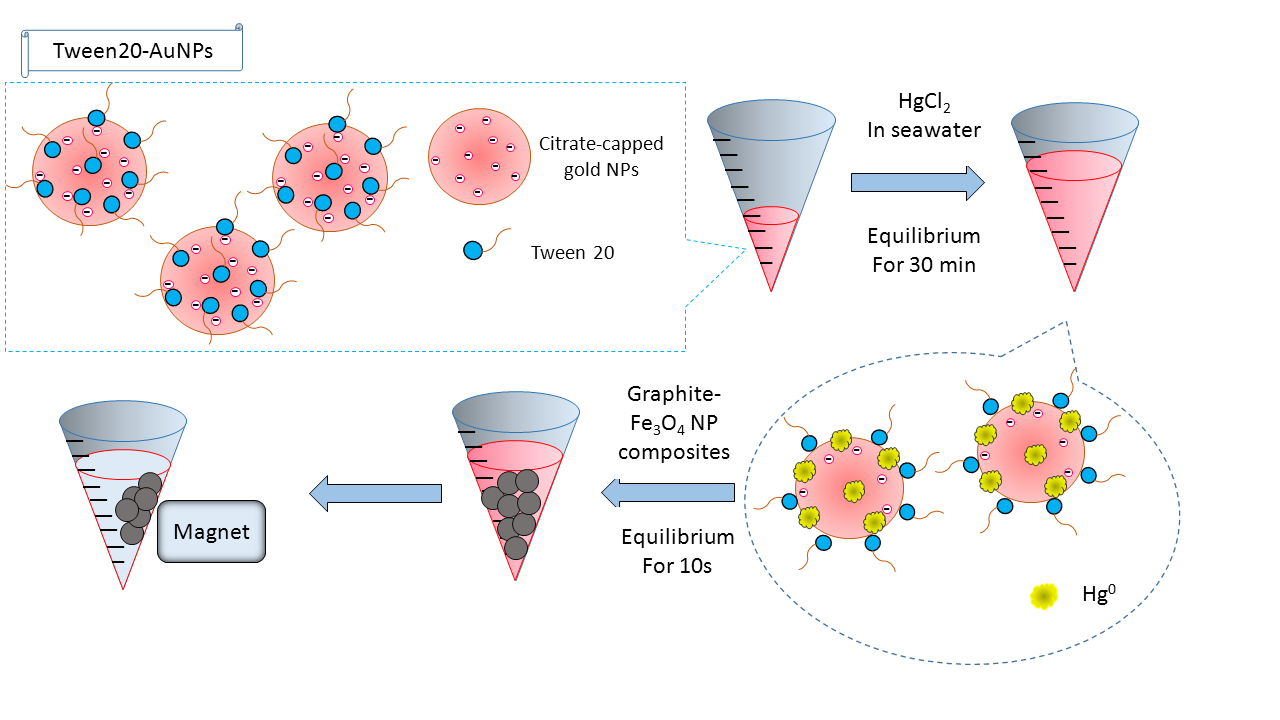
Figure 2: Procedure associated with the removal of Hg^{2+} by the combination of Tween 20-Au NPs and reduced graphite-Fe_{3}O_{4} NP composites

The application of an external magnetic field helps reduce the Fe_{3}O_{4} NP compositions and can be used to remove the citrate capped gold NPs or Tween 20- Au NPs. The quantity of the Hg^{2+} is determined by ICP-MS. Elimination efficiency is calculated as:

Elimination Efficiency (%) = [(Co – C)/ Co] x 100

The equilibrium absorption capacity was determined by:

qe = (Co – Ce) x (V/W)

where qe is the equilibrium absorption capacity, Ce is the concentration of Hg^{2+}, V is the volume of the solution and W is the weight of Tween 20-Au NPs. Other metals in place of mercury can be used to determine the reusability of the nanofiltration method. A simple nanofiltration process is illustrated in Figure 2.

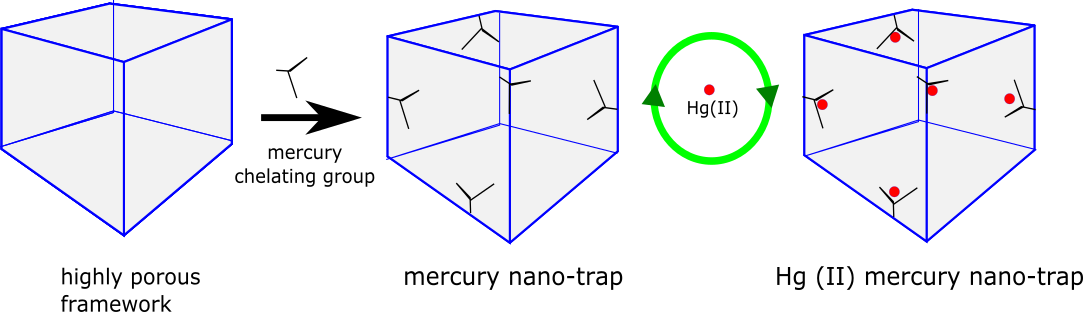
Figure 3:A highly porous framework such as water is treated with mercury chelating groups, which serve as the "mercury nano trap". These chelating groups hold tightly onto Hg (II) ions, removing it from the water.

When purifying mercury from sea water, a decrease in the volume to surface area ratio leads to a decline in the efficiency of the elimination.7 Cost efficiency of the nanotrap process is indicated in the fact that the materials can be reused to recycle more water. Tween 20-Au NPs are rapid, efficient and selective in capturing Hg2+ in high salt water concentration when the gold NPs catalyze the citrate ion induced reduction of Hg2+ to Hg0. ICP-MS is used to quantify the Hg2+ concentration to determine the level of elimination efficiency. Figure 3 shows an illustration process of the nano trap filtration process.

The use of nanomaterials in removing the mercury from water is advantageous because of the high surface area to volume ratio and the fact that they are easily chemically functionalized. Nanomaterials capture five times more mercury than the maximum mercury captured predicted through the use of previous mercury filtration systems. Compared to other NP-based methods for Hg2+ removal from high salt matrix, Tween 20-Au NPs is a rapid and selective technique with high efficiency. For purification of drinking water, it is advisable to use nano-tablets with the filters because they are easily accessible and cost efficient.

== See also ==
- Aquatic toxicology
- American Water Works Association
- Ecological sanitation
- List of waste water treatment technologies
- Microfiltration
- National Rural Water Association
- Sewage treatment
- Water conservation
- Water treatment
