= Vibratory shear-enhanced process =

Vibratory shear enhanced process (VSEP) is a membrane separation technology platform invented in 1987 and patented in 1989 by Dr. J. Brad Culkin. VSEP's vibration system was designed to prevent membrane fouling, or the build-up of solid particles on the surface of the membrane. VSEP systems have been applied in a variety of industrial environments.

== History and technology development ==
After earning his PhD in chemical engineering from Northwestern University Dr. Culkin spent his early professional career with Dorr–Oliver, Inc., a pioneering company in the area of separation processes. Culkin contributed to six Dorr–Oliver patent applications in 1985 and 1986.

While at Dorr–Oliver, Dr. Culkin was exposed to the advantages of membrane separation technology as well as its failings. The membrane's Achilles' heel, Culkin decided, was fouling.

Concurrent with his membrane work, Culkin was helping to develop a mechanically resonating loudspeaker with the founders of Velodyne Acoustics. Culkin married these two areas of expertise and struck out to overcome membrane fouling through the use of vibration.

The first VSEP prototype Culkin developed was a literal combination of loudspeaker and membrane technology as the photo shows below.

== Principle of operation ==
A VSEP filter uses oscillatory vibration to create high shear at the surface of the filter membrane. This high shear force significantly improves the filter's resistance to fouling thereby enabling high throughputs and minimizing reject volumes. VSEP feed stream are split into two products—a permeate stream with little or no solids and a concentrate stream with a solids concentration much higher than that of the original feed stream.

== Industrial applications ==
VSEP has been applied in a variety of industrial application areas including pulp and paper, chemical processing, landfill leachate, oil and gas, RO Reject and a variety of industrial wastewaters.

== Awards ==
A VSEP system was recognized in 2009 as part of the WateReuse Foundation's Desalination Project of the Year. The system was installed to minimize the brine from an electrodialysis reversal (EDR) system.
