= Nanofiltration =

Filtration method that uses nanometer sized pores in biological membranes

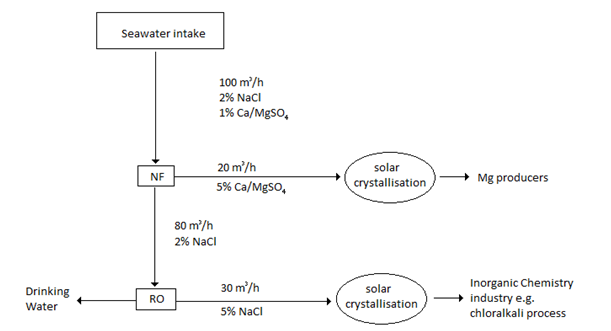
Process diagram nanofiltration

Nanofiltration is a membrane filtration process that uses nanometer sized pores through which particles smaller than about 1–10 nanometers pass through the membrane. Nanofiltration membranes have pore sizes of about 1–10 nanometers, smaller than those used in microfiltration and ultrafiltration, but a slightly bigger than those in reverse osmosis. Membranes used are predominantly polymer thin films. It is used to soften, disinfect, and remove impurities from water, and to purify or separate chemicals such as pharmaceuticals.

== Membranes ==
Membrane materials that are commonly used are polymer thin films such as polyethylene terephthalate or metals such as aluminium. Pore dimensions are controlled by pH, temperature and time during development with pore densities ranging from 1 to 10^6 pores per cm^{2}. Membranes made from polyethylene terephthalate (PET) and other similar materials, are referred to as "track-etch" membranes, named after the way the pores on the membranes are made. "Tracking" involves bombarding the polymer thin film with high energy particles. This results in making tracks that are chemically developed into the membrane, or "etched" into the membrane, which are the pores. Membranes created from metal such as alumina membranes, are made by electrochemically growing a thin layer of aluminum oxide from aluminum in an acidic medium.

== Range of applications ==
Historically, nanofiltration and other membrane technology used for molecular separation was applied entirely on aqueous systems. The original uses for nanofiltration were water treatment and in particular water softening. Nanofilters "soften" water by retaining scale-forming divalent ions (e.g. Ca^{2+}, Mg^{2+}).

Nanofiltration has been extended into other industries such as milk and juice production as well as pharmaceuticals, fine chemicals, and flavour and fragrance industries.

| Industry | Uses |
|---|---|
| Fine chemistry and Pharmaceuticals | Non-thermal solvent recovery and management Room temperature solvent exchange |
| Oil and Petroleum chemistry | Removal of tar components in feed Purification of gas condensates |
| Bulk Chemistry | Product Polishing Continuous recovery of homogeneous catalysts |
| Natural Essential Oils and similar products | Fractionation of crude extracts Enrichment of natural compounds Gentle Separations |
| Medicine | Able to extract amino acids and lipids from blood and other cell culture. |

== Advantages and disadvantages ==
One of the main advantages of nanofiltration as a method of softening water is that during the process of retaining calcium and magnesium ions while passing smaller hydrated monovalent ions, filtration is performed without adding extra sodium ions, as used in ion exchangers. Many separation processes do not operate at room temperature (e.g. distillation), which greatly increases the cost of the process when continuous heating or cooling is applied. Performing gentle molecular separation is linked with nanofiltration that is often not included with other forms of separation processes (centrifugation). These are two of the main benefits that are associated with nanofiltration. Nanofiltration has a very favorable benefit of being able to process large volumes and continuously produce streams of products. Still, Nanofiltration is the least used method of membrane filtration in industry as the membrane pores sizes are limited to only a few nanometers. Anything smaller, reverse osmosis is used and anything larger is used for ultrafiltration. Ultrafiltration can also be used in cases where nanofiltration can be used, due to it being more conventional. A main disadvantage associated with nanotechnology, as with all membrane filter technology, is the cost and maintenance of the membranes used. Nanofiltration membranes are an expensive part of the process. Repairs and replacement of membranes is dependent on total dissolved solids, flow rate and components of the feed. With nanofiltration being used across various industries, only an estimation of replacement frequency can be used. This causes nanofilters to be replaced a short time before or after their prime usage is complete.

== Design and operation ==
Industrial applications of membranes require hundreds to thousands of square meters of membranes and therefore an efficient way to reduce the footprint by packing them is required. Membranes first became commercially viable when low cost methods of housing in 'modules' were achieved. Membranes are not self-supporting. They need to be stayed by a porous support that can withstand the pressures required to operate the NF membrane without hindering the performance of the membrane. To do this effectively, the module needs to provide a channel to remove the membrane permeation and provide appropriate flow condition that reduces the phenomena of concentration polarisation. A good design minimises pressure losses on both the feed side and permeate side and thus energy requirements.

=== Concentration polarisation ===
Concentration polarization describes the accumulation of the species being retained close to the surface of the membrane which reduces separation capabilities. It occurs because the particles are convected towards the membrane with the solvent and its magnitude is the balance between this convection caused by solvent flux and the particle transport away from the membrane due to the concentration gradient (predominantly caused by diffusion.) Although concentration polarization is easily reversible, it can lead to fouling of the membrane.

=== Spiral wound module ===
Spiral wound modules are the most commonly used style of module and are 'standardized' design, available in a range of standard diameters (2.5", 4" and 8") to fit standard pressure vessel that can hold several modules in series connected by O-rings. The module uses flat sheets wrapped around a central tube. The membranes are glued along three edges over a permeate spacer to form 'leaves'. The permeate spacer supports the membrane and conducts the permeate to the central permeate tube. Between each leaf, a mesh like feed spacer is inserted. The reason for the mesh like dimension of the spacer is to provide a hydrodynamic environment near the surface of the membrane that discourages concentration polarisation. Once the leaves have been wound around the central tube, the module is wrapped in a casing layer and caps placed on the end of the cylinder to prevent 'telescoping' that can occur in high flow rate and pressure conditions.

=== Tubular module ===
Tubular modules look similar to shell and tube heat exchangers with bundles of tubes with the active surface of the membrane on the inside. Flow through the tubes is normally turbulent, ensuring low concentration polarisation but also increasing energy costs. The tubes can either be self-supporting or supported by insertion into perforated metal tubes. This module design is limited for nanofiltration by the pressure they can withstand before bursting, limiting the maximum flux possible. Due to both the high energy operating costs of turbulent flow and the limiting burst pressure, tubular modules are more suited to 'dirty' applications where feeds have particulates such as filtering raw water to gain potable water in the Fyne process. The membranes can be easily cleaned through a 'pigging' technique with foam balls are squeezed through the tubes, scouring the caked deposits.

=== Flux enhancing strategies ===
These strategies work to reduce the magnitude of concentration polarisation and fouling. There is a range of techniques available however the most common is feed channel spacers as described in spiral wound modules. All of the strategies work by increasing eddies and generating a high shear in the flow near the membrane surface. Some of these strategies include vibrating the membrane, rotating the membrane, having a rotor disk above the membrane, pulsing the feed flow rate and introducing gas bubbling close to the surface of the membrane.

== Characterisation ==
=== Performance parameters ===
Retention of both charged and uncharged solutes and permeation measurements can be categorised into performance parameters since the performance under natural conditions of a membrane is based on the ratio of solute retained/ permeated through the membrane.

For charged solutes, the ionic distribution of salts near the membrane-solution interface plays an important role in determining the retention characteristic of a membrane. If the charge of the membrane and the composition and concentration of the solution to be filtered is known, the distribution of various salts can be found. This in turn can be combined with the known charge of the membrane and the Gibbs–Donnan effect to predict the retention characteristics for that membrane.

Uncharged solutes cannot be characterised simply by molecular weight cut-off (MWCO), although in general an increase in molecular weight or solute size leads to an increase in retention. The charge and structure, pH of the solute, influence the retention characteristics.

=== Morphology parameters ===
The morphology of a membrane is usually established by microscopy. Atomic force microscopy (AFM) is one method used to characterise the surface roughness of a membrane by passing a small sharp tip (<100 Ă) across the surface of a membrane and measuring the resulting Van der Waals force between the atoms in the end of the tip and the surface. This is useful as a direct correlation between surface roughness and colloidal fouling has been developed. Correlations also exist between fouling and other morphology parameters, such as hydrophobe, showing that the more hydrophobic a membrane is, the less prone to fouling it is. See membrane fouling for more information.

Methods to determine the porosity of porous membranes have also been found via permporometry, making use of differing vapour pressures to characterise the pore size and pore size distribution within the membrane. Initially all pores in the membrane are completely filled with a liquid and as such no permeation of a gas occurs, but after reducing the relative vapour pressure some gaps will start to form within the pores as dictated by the Kelvin equation. Polymeric (non-porous) membranes cannot be subjected to this methodology as the condensable vapour should have a negligible interaction within the membrane.

=== Solute transport and rejection ===
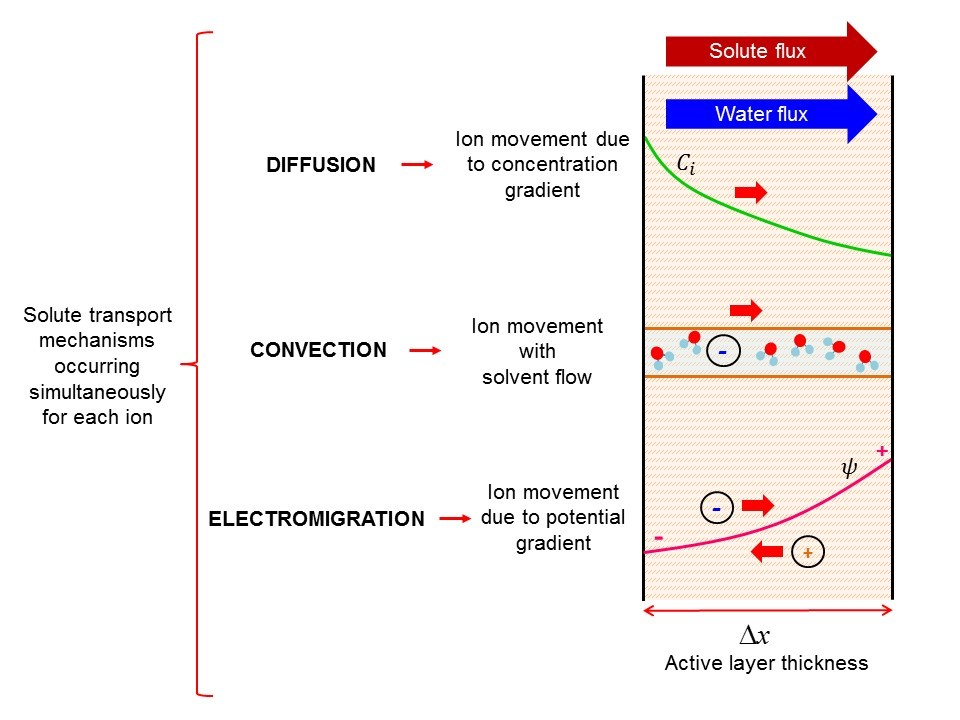
Mechanisms through which solutes in nanofiltration transport through the membrane.

Unlike membranes with larger and smaller pore sizes, passage of solutes through nanofiltration is significantly more complex.

Because of the pore sizes, there are three modes of transport of solutes through the membrane. These include 1) diffusion (molecule travel due to concentration potential gradients, as seen through reverse osmosis membranes), 2) convection (travel with flow, like in larger pore size filtration such as microfiltration), and 3) electromigration (attraction or repulsion from charges within and near the membrane).

Additionally, the exclusion mechanisms in nanofiltration are more complex than in other forms of filtration. Most filtration systems operate solely by size (steric) exclusion, but at small length scales seen in nanofiltration, important effects include surface charge and hydration (solvation shell). The exclusion due to hydration is referred to as dielectric exclusion, a reference to the dielectric constants (energy) associated with a particles presence in solution versus within a membrane substrate. Solution pH strongly impacts surface charge, providing a method to understand and better control rejection.

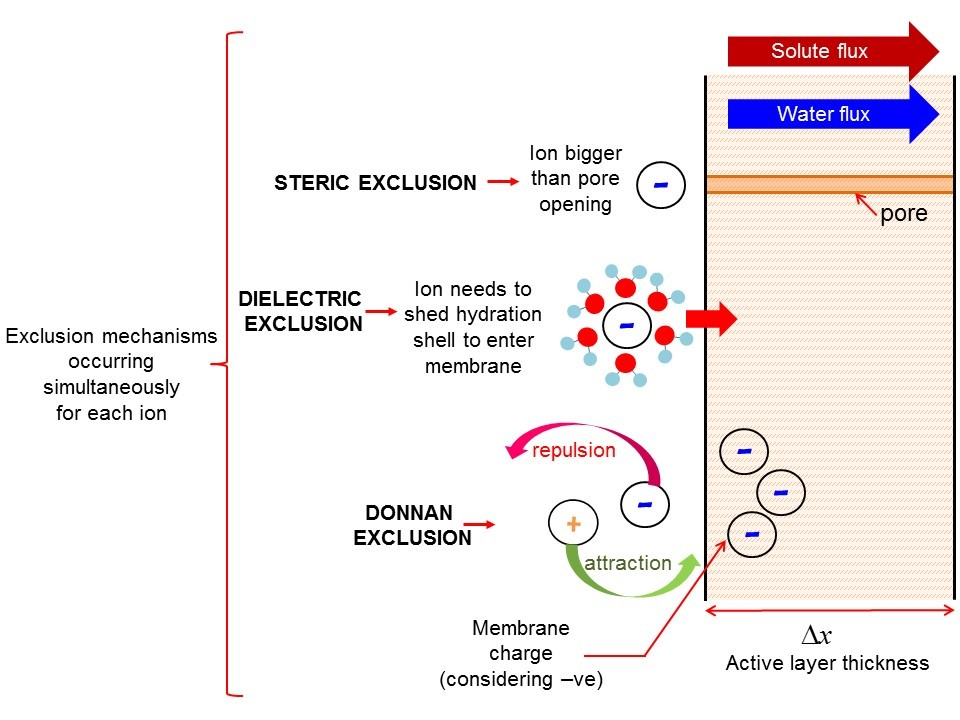
Primary rejection mechanisms that prevent solutes from entering the pores in nanofiltration.

The transport and exclusion mechanisms are heavily influenced by membrane pore size, solvent viscosity, membrane thickness, solute diffusivity, solution temperature, solution pH, and membrane dielectric constant. The pore size distribution is also important. Modeling rejection accurately for NF is very challenging. It can be done with applications of the Nernst–Planck equation, although a heavy reliance on fitting parameters to experimental data is usually required.

In general, charged solutes are much more effectively rejected in NF than uncharged solutes, and multivalent solutes like SO^{2−}_{4} (valence of 2) experience very high rejection.

== Typical figures for industrial applications ==
Keeping in mind that NF is usually part of a composite system for purification, a single unit is chosen based on the design specifications for the NF unit. For drinking water purification many commercial membranes exist, coming from chemical families having diverse structures, chemical tolerances and salt rejections.

NF units in drinking water purification range from extremely low salt rejection (<5% in 1001A membranes) to almost complete rejection (99% in 8040-TS80-TSA membranes.) Flow rates range from 25 to 60 m^{3}/day for each unit, so commercial filtration requires multiple NF units in parallel to process large quantities of feed water. The pressures required in these units are generally between 4.5 and 7.5 bar.

For seawater desalination using a NF-RO system a typical process is shown below.

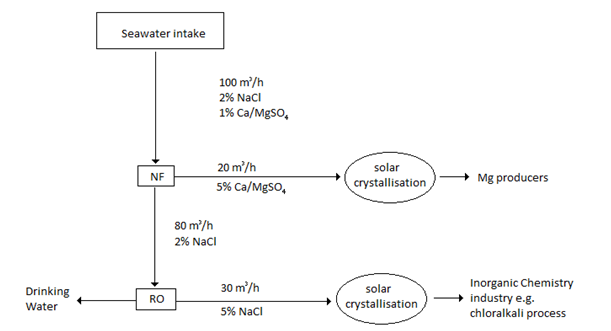

Because NF permeate is rarely clean enough to be used as the final product for drinking water and other water purification, is it commonly used as a pre treatment step for reverse osmosis (RO) as is shown above.

== Post-treatment ==
As with other membrane based separations such as ultrafiltration, microfiltration and reverse osmosis, post-treatment of either permeate or retentate flow streams (depending on the application) – is a necessary stage in industrial NF separation prior to commercial distribution of the product. The choice and order of unit operations employed in post-treatment is dependent on water quality regulations and the design of the NF system. Typical NF water purification post-treatment stages include aeration and disinfection & stabilisation.

=== Aeration ===
A polyvinyl chloride (PVC) or fibre-reinforced plastic (FRP) degasifier is used to remove dissolved gases such as carbon dioxide and hydrogen sulfide from the permeate stream. This is achieved by blowing air in a countercurrent direction to the water falling through packing material in the degasifier. The air effectively strips the unwanted gases from the water.

=== Disinfection and stabilisation ===
The permeate water from a NF separation is demineralised and may be disposed to large changes in pH, thus providing a substantial risk of corrosion in piping and other equipment components. To increase the stability of the water, chemical addition of alkaline solutions such as lime and caustic soda is employed. Furthermore, disinfectants such as chlorine or chloroamine are added to the permeate, as well as phosphate or fluoride corrosion inhibitors in some cases.

== Research trends ==
Challenges in nanofiltration (NF) technology include minimising membrane fouling and reducing energy requirements. Thin film composite membranes (TFC), which consist of a number of extremely thin selective layers interfacially polymerized over a microporous substrate, have had commercial success in industrial membrane applications. Electrospun nanofibrous membrane layers (ENMs) enhance permeate flux. Energy-efficient alternatives to the commonly used spiral wound arrangement are hollow fibre membranes, which require less pre-treatment. Titanium dioxide nanoparticles have been used to minimize membrane fouling.

== See also ==
- Applications of nanotechnology – Uses for technology on very small scales
- Mercury nano-trap water filtration – Method of eliminating pollution
- Nanomaterials – Materials with granular size 1 to 100 nm
- Nanotechnology – Technology with features near one nanometer
- Reverse osmosis – Water purification process
- Ultrafiltration – Filtration by force through a semipermeable membrane
