= Repligen =

American biotechnology company

Repligen Corporation
- Type: Public
- Traded as: Nasdaq: RGEN; S&P 400 Component
- Industry: Biotechnology Pharmaceutical Laboratory equipment
- Founded: 1981; 45 years ago
- Founders: Alexander Rich; Paul Schimmel
- Headquarters: Waltham, Massachusetts, United States
- Key people: Olivier Loeillot (president and CEO)
- Products: Materials used in the manufacture of biological drugs
- Revenue: ▲US$738 million (2025)
- Number of employees: c. 2,000 (2025)
- Website: repligen.com

Repligen Corporation is an American life sciences company that develops and manufactures products used in biological drug manufacturing. The company is headquartered in Waltham, Massachusetts, and is listed on the Nasdaq under the symbol RGEN.

== History ==
Repligen was founded in 1981 by Alexander Rich and Paul Schimmel and was incorporated in Delaware. It has a headquarters and manufacturing facility in Waltham, Massachusetts.

In 2008, an agreement was struck to divest certain intellectual property rights to Bristol-Myers Squibb around the drug Orencia in exchange for ongoing royalty payments through the end of 2013.

In 2011, Repligen acquired Novozymes Biopharma Sweden AB, formerly owned by Novozymes, now Novonesis. The acquisition included a production line for affinity ligands, and another for cell culture supplements for mammalian cell fermentation. This acquisition doubled the company's bioprocessing capabilities.

Before 2012, Repligen maintained dual capabilities in developing pharmaceutical therapeutics (drug discovery and development) and the development of materials supporting biological drug manufacture (bioprocessing business). A decision was made in 2012 to focus on the bioprocessing business and reduce research and development expenditures.

Development of an imaging agent, designated RG1068, based on a synthetic human hormone was halted in 2012 following a request by the FDA for additional safety and efficacy data beyond that provided in a New Drug Application submission; a marketing authorisation application had been submitted in parallel to the EMA.

At the end of 2012, Repligen out-licensed its spinal muscular atrophy program, in particular the small molecule candidate drug RG3039, to Pfizer. This divestment included licensing rights to two patents to Pfizer.

At the start of 2014, the company out-licensed its Friedreich's ataxia program, including a library of histone deacetylase inhibitor compounds, to BioMarin Pharmaceutical for US$2,000,000 and future milestone and royalty payments.

Repligen has made several acquisitions through the early 2020s, including BioFlex Solutions and Tantti Laboratory Inc. among others.

As of 2024, the company's President and Chief Executive Officer is Olivier Loeillot.

As of 2025 it employs approximately 2,000 employees across several sites in the United States, Europe, and Asia.

== Products and services ==
Repligen develops and manufactures products used in bioprocessing and biological drug manufacturing. The company was a major supplier of Protein A, both native and recombinant forms, to the pharmaceutical industry, which accounted for most of its sales in the early 2010s. It has since expanded into other areas, including filtration and fluid management, chromatography, process analytics and proteins, serving biologics such as monoclonal antibodies, antibody-drug conjugates, bispecific antibodies, fusion proteins, mRNA products, and cell and gene therapies. Some of its better-known product families include XCell ATF perfusion systems, OPUS pre-packed chromatography columns, KrosFlo tangential flow filtration systems, and CTech variable pathlength spectroscopy systems such as SoloVPE and FlowVPE. Many of these expansions have occurred through acquisitions, including BioFlash (OPUS), Refine Technology (ATF), ARTeSYN Biosolutions, and others.

Growth factor products and the native form of Protein A and recombinant Protein A are manufactured in Sweden; assembly of the OPUS chromatography product line is done in the United States.

== Sources ==
- Forbes (2014). "Alexander Rich". Profiles. Forbes. Archived from the original on 15 March 2014.
- Gen. Eng. Biotechnol. News (February 15, 2014). "BioMarin Nabs Repligen's HDACi Compound Library". News: Discovery & Development. Gen. Eng. Biotechnol. News (paper). Vol. 34, no. 4. p. 14.
- International New York Times (2014). "Repligen Corporation". Business Day. International New York Times. Company Information. Archived from the original on 15 March 2014.
- Motley Fool (2014). "Repligen Corp Key Executives RGEN". The Motley Fool. Archived from the original on 15 March 2014.
- "Repligen Corporation, Form 10-K, 2013", SEC Documents, Form 10-K, Repligen, 2014-03-14, Commission File Number 000-14656
- Street Insider (19 September 2011). "Repligen (RGEN) Replaces Board Member Alex Rich with Alfred Goldberg". Street Insider. Archived from the original on 15 March 2014.
