= Cross-flow filtration =

Filtration technique

Diagram of cross-flow filtration

In chemical engineering, biochemical engineering and protein purification, cross-flow filtration (also known as tangential flow filtration) is a type of filtration (a particular unit operation). Cross-flow filtration is different from dead-end filtration in which the feed is passed through a membrane or bed, the solids being trapped in the filter and the filtrate being released at the other end. Cross-flow filtration gets its name because the majority of the feed flow travels tangentially across the surface of the filter, rather than into the filter. The principal advantage of this is that the filter cake (which can blind the filter) is substantially washed away during the filtration process, increasing the length of time that a filter unit can be operational. It can be a continuous process, unlike batch-wise dead-end filtration.

Diagram of cross-flow filtration

This type of filtration is typically selected for feeds containing a high proportion of small particle size solids (where the permeate is of most value) because solid material can quickly block (blind) the filter surface with dead-end filtration. Industrial examples of this include the extraction of soluble antibiotics from fermentation liquors.

The main driving force of cross-flow filtration process is transmembrane pressure. Transmembrane pressure is a measure of pressure difference between two sides of the membrane. During the process, the transmembrane pressure might decrease due to an increase of permeate viscosity, therefore filtration efficiency decreases and can be time-consuming for large-scale processes. This can be prevented by diluting permeate or increasing flow rate of the system.

== Operation ==
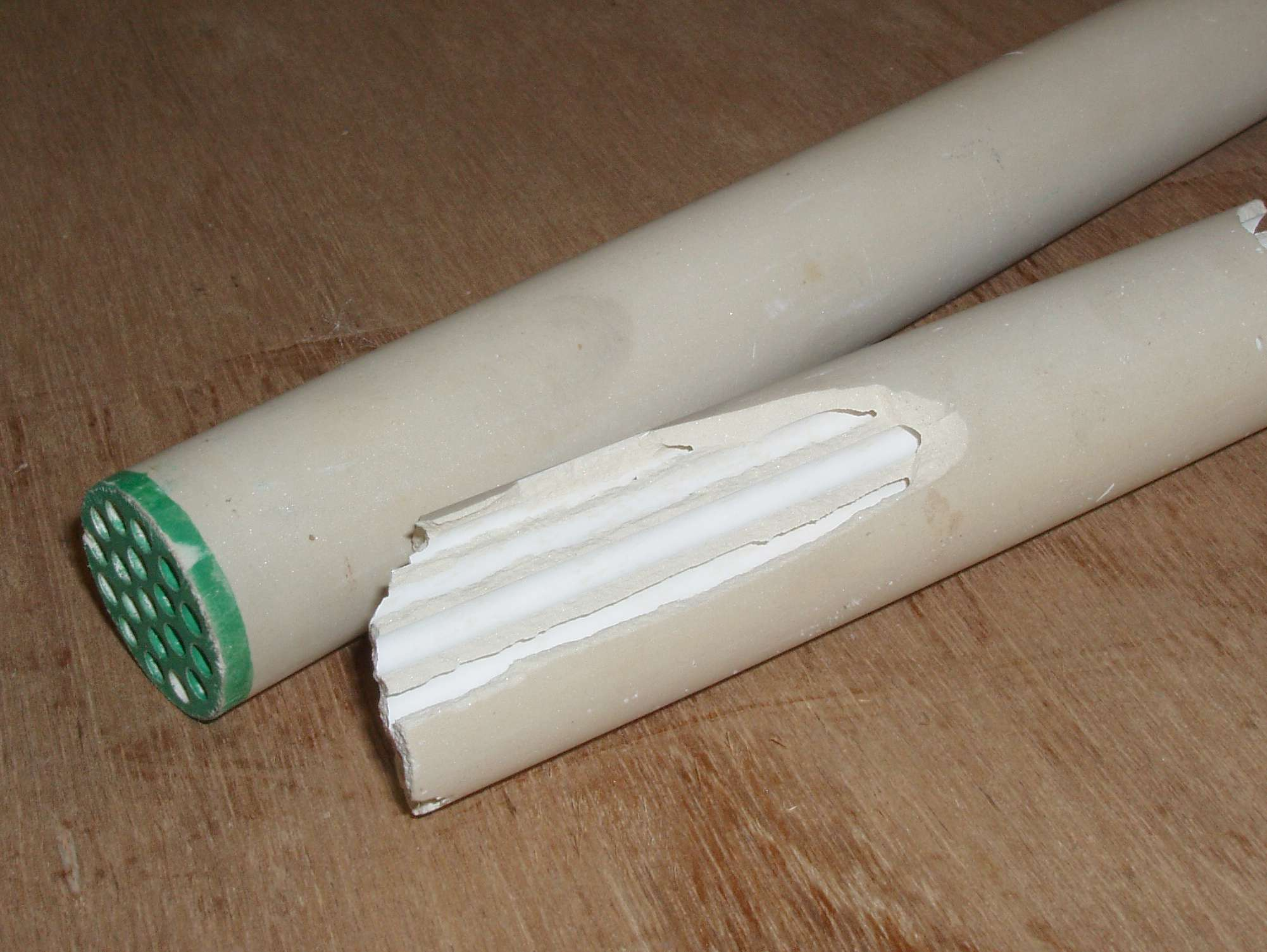
Ceramic membrane for industrial cross-flow filtration

In cross-flow filtration, the feed is passed across the filter membrane (tangentially) at positive pressure relative to the permeate side. A proportion of the material which is smaller than the membrane pore size passes through the membrane as permeate or filtrate; everything else is retained on the feed side of the membrane as retentate.

With cross-flow filtration the tangential motion of the bulk of the fluid across the membrane causes trapped particles on the filter surface to be rubbed off. This means that a cross-flow filter can operate continuously at relatively high solids loads without blinding.

== Benefits over conventional filtration ==
- A higher overall liquid removal rate is achieved by the prevention of filter cake formation
- Process feed remains in the form of a mobile slurry, suitable for further processing
- Solids content of the product slurry may be varied over a wide range
- It is possible to fractionate particles by size
- Tubular pinch effect

== Industrial applications ==
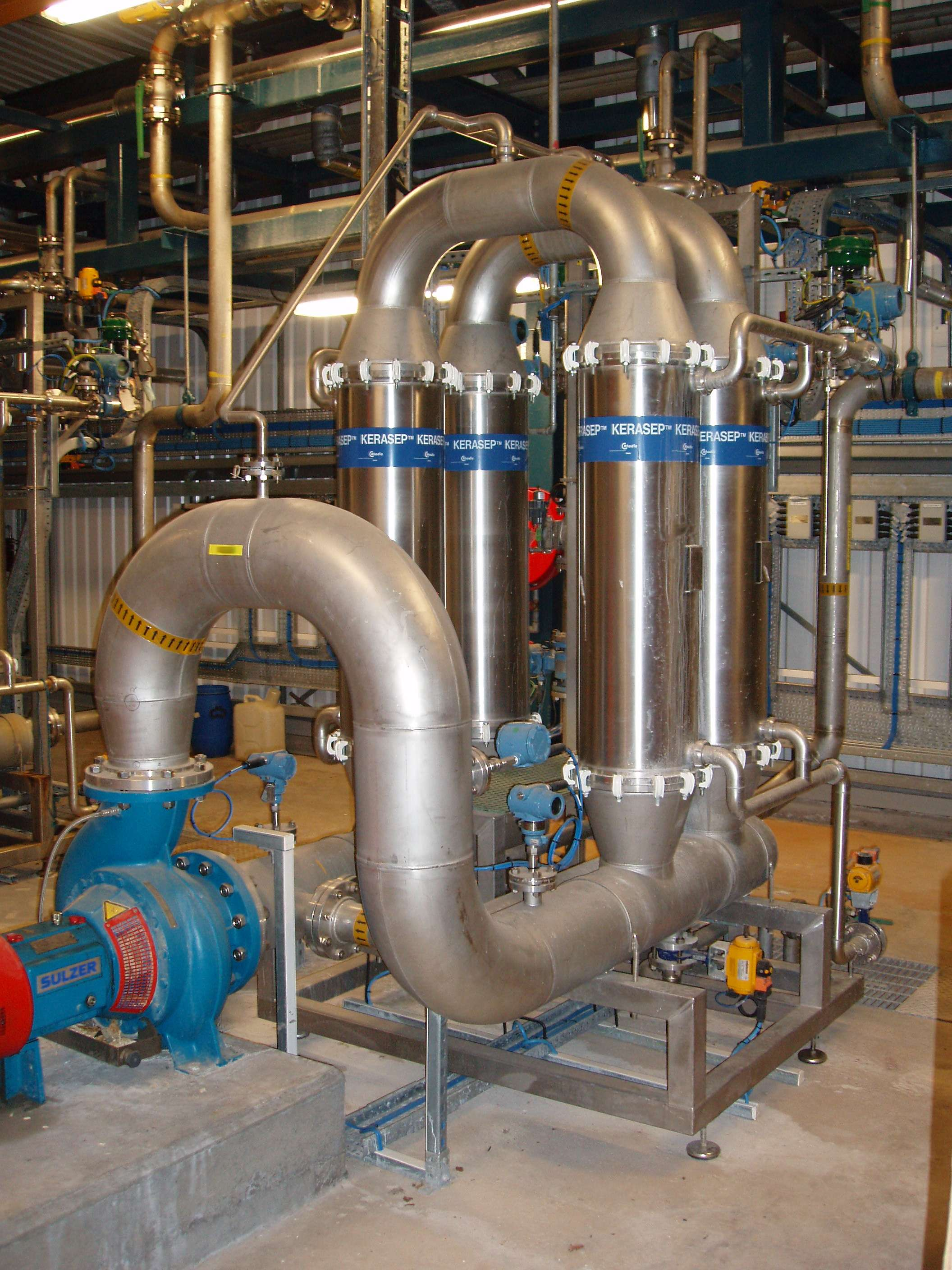
Filtration unit for industrial cross-flow filtration

Cross-flow membrane filtration technology has been used widely in industry around the globe. Filtration membranes can be polymeric or ceramic, depending upon the application. The principles of cross-flow filtration are used in reverse osmosis, nanofiltration, ultrafiltration and microfiltration. When purifying water, it can be very cost-effective in comparison to the traditional evaporation methods.

In protein purification, the term tangential flow filtration (TFF) is used to describe cross-flow filtration with membranes. The process can be used at different stages during purification, depending on the type of membrane selected.

In the photograph of an industrial filtration unit (right), it is possible to see that the recycle pipework is considerably larger than either the feed pipework (vertical pipe on the right hand side) or the permeate pipework (small manifolds near to the rows of white clamps). These pipe sizes are directly related to the proportion of liquid that flows through the unit. A dedicated pump is used to recycle the feed several times around the unit before the solids-rich retentate is transferred to the next part of the process.

== Techniques to improve performance ==
=== Backwashing ===
In backwashing, the transmembrane pressure is periodically inverted by the use of a secondary pump, so that permeate flows back into the feed, lifting the fouling layer from the surface of the membrane. Backwashing is not applicable to spirally wound membranes and is not a general practice in most applications. (See Clean-in-place)

=== Alternating tangential flow (ATF) ===
A diaphragm pump is used to produce an alternating tangential flow, helping to dislodge retained particles and prevent membrane fouling. Repligen is the largest producer of ATF systems.

=== Clean-in-place (CIP) ===
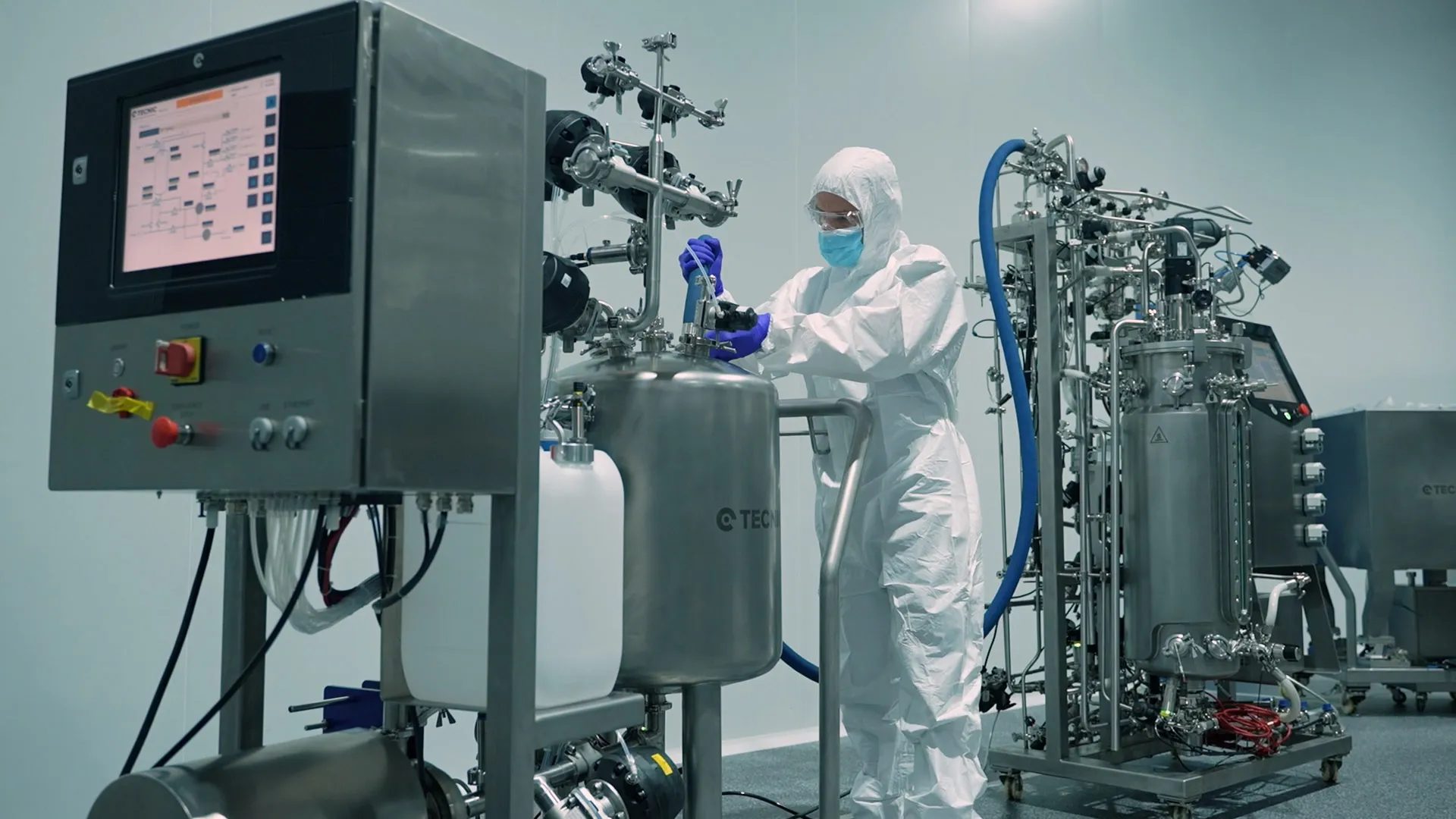
A person dressed in a white coverall using a cleaning in place system.

Clean-in-place systems are typically used to remove fouling from membranes after extensive use. The CIP process may use detergents, reactive agents such as sodium hypochlorite and acids and alkalis such as citric acid and sodium hydroxide (NaOH). Sodium hypochlorite (bleach) must be removed from the feed in some membrane plants. Bleach oxidizes thin-film membranes. Oxidation will degrade the membranes to a point where they will no longer perform at rated rejection levels and have to be replaced. Bleach can be added to a sodium hydroxide CIP during an initial system start-up before spirally-wound membranes are loaded into the plant to help disinfect the system. Bleach is also used to CIP perforated stainless steel (Graver) membranes, as their tolerance for sodium hypochlorite is much higher than a spirally-wound membrane. Caustics and acids are most often used as primary CIP chemicals. Caustic removes organic fouling and acid removes minerals. Enzyme solutions are also used in some systems for helping remove organic fouling material from the membrane plant. The pH and temperature are important to a CIP program. If pH and temperature are too high the membrane will degrade and flux performance will suffer. If pH and temperature are too low, the system simply will not be cleaned properly. Every application has different CIP requirements. e.g. a dairy reverse osmosis (RO) plant most likely will require a more rigorous CIP program than a water purification RO plant. Each membrane manufacturer has their own guidelines for CIP procedures for their product.

=== Concentration ===
The volume of the fluid is reduced by allowing permeate flow to occur. Solvent, solutes, and particles smaller than the membrane pore size pass through the membrane, while particles larger than the pore size are retained, and thereby concentrated. In bioprocessing applications, concentration may be followed by diafiltration.

=== Diafiltration ===
In order to effectively remove permeate components from the slurry, fresh solvent may be added to the feed to replace the permeate volume, at the same rate as the permeate flow rate, such that the volume in the system remains constant. This is analogous to the washing of filter cake to remove soluble components. Dilution and re-concentration is sometimes also referred to as "diafiltration".

=== Process flow disruption (PFD) ===
A technically simpler approach than backwashing is to set the transmembrane pressure to zero by temporarily closing off the permeate outlet, which increases the attrition of the fouling layer without the need for a second pump. PFD is not as effective as backwashing in removing fouling, but can be advantageous.

== Model-based fouling control ==
Membrane fouling in cross-flow filtration may be managed through operating strategies derived from physical and mechanistic models. This approach is sometimes described as deterministic fouling control, and is based on the observation that fouling behavior in pressure-driven membrane systems often follows distinct regimes governed by dominant transport and deposition mechanisms.

Classical descriptions, including those derived from Hermia's fouling laws, relate flux decline to pore blocking, intermediate mechanisms, and cake formation.

In this context, operating parameters such as transmembrane pressure, cross-flow velocity, and flux can be selected to remain within conditions associated with limited or reversible fouling. This approach is related to established concepts such as critical flux and boundary flux, which define operating thresholds below which fouling remains controlled.

Such approaches are widely applied in biopharmaceutical processes using tangential flow filtration (TFF), where control of fouling behavior is relevant for maintaining stable flux and separation performance.

Recent technical analyses have proposed unified interpretations of fouling behavior based on physically derived operating regimes and system-scale transport effects.

The terminology is not universally standardized and overlaps with broader model-based and mechanistic approaches to fouling control in membrane engineering.

== Flow rate calculation ==
The flux or flow rate in cross-flow filtration systems is given by the equation:

$J = \frac{\Delta P}{(R_{\rm m} + R_{\rm c}) \mu}$

in which:

- $J$: liquid flux
- $\Delta P$: transmembrane pressure (should also include effects of osmotic pressure for reverse osmosis membranes)
- $R_{\rm m}$: Resistance of the membrane (related to overall porosity)
- $R_{\rm c}$: Resistance of the cake (variable; related to membrane fouling)
- $\mu$: liquid viscosity

Note: $R_{\rm m}$ and $R_{\rm c}$ include the inverse of the membrane surface area in their derivation; thus, flux increases with increasing membrane area.

== See also ==
- Dead-end filtration
- Membrane fouling
