= Tubular pinch effect =

Phenomenon in fluid mechanics

The tubular pinch effect is a phenomenon in fluid mechanics, which has importance in membrane technology. This effect describes a tendency for suspended particles flowing through a pipe to reach an equilibrium distribution with the region of highest concentration of particles lies between the central axis and the wall of the pipe.

Mark C. Porter first suspected that the pinch effect was responsible for the return of separated particles into the core flow by the membrane. This effect was first demonstrated in 1956 by G. Sergé and A. Silberberg. They had been working with dilute suspensions of spherical particles in pipelines. While the particle was flowing through the pipeline, it appeared to migrate away from the pipe axis and pipe wall and reach equilibrium in a radial eccentric position.

Radial distribution of the particle concentration c in a tube during the flow-through

If:

$v_p$	radial velocity component of a particle
$d_T$	tube diameter
$d_p$	particle diameter
$r^*$	equilibrium radius
$w^*$	mean flow velocity
$Re$	Reynolds number
$r$	radius

then the pinch effect follows the relation:

$$v_\text{p}=0.17 \cdot w^* \cdot Re \cdot {\left( \frac{d_\text{p}}{d_\text{T}} \right)} ^{2.84} \cdot \frac{2r}{d_\text{T}}\cdot \left(1 - \frac{r}{r^*}\right)$$

This effect is of importance in cross-flow filtration and especially in dialysis. It is significant especially for particles with a diameter of 5 μm and for particles which follow laminar flow conditions and slows down the process of filter cake formation, which prolongs the service life and the filtering stays permanently high.
