= Capillary flow porometry =

Wetting liquid displacement-based characterization technique

Capillary flow porometry, also known as porometry, is a characterization technique based on the displacement of a wetting liquid from the sample pores by applying a gas at increasing pressure. It is widely used to measure minimum, maximum (or first bubble point) and mean flow pore sizes, and pore size distribution in membranes nonwovens, paper, filtration and ultrafiltration media, hollow fibers, ceramics, etc.

In capillary flow porometry an inert gas is used to displace a liquid, which is in the pores. The pressure required to empty the pore corresponds to the pressure necessary to evacuate the liquid from the most constricted part of the pore. This most constricted part is the most challenging one and it offers the highest resistance to remove the wetting liquid. This parameter is very relevant in filtration and similar applications since it is important to know the smallest diameter of the through pores.

== Calculation of the pore size ==
In order to measure the pore size by capillary flow porometry it is necessary to impregnate the samples with a wetting liquid. An inert gas flow is used to displace the liquid that is in the pores and the pressure required to empty the most constricted part of the pore is measured. The most constricted part of the pore is the most challenging one because it offers the highest resistance to remove the wetting liquid. This parameter is very important in filtration and similar applications since it is essential to know the smallest diameter of the through pores.

This measured pressure permits obtaining the pore diameter, which is calculated by using the Young-Laplace formula P= 4*γ*cos θ*/D in which D is the pore size diameter, P is the pressure measured, γ is the surface tension of the wetting liquid and θ is the contact angle of the wetting liquid with the sample. The surface tension γ is a measurable physical property and depends on the wetting liquid used. The contact angle θ depends on the interaction between the material and the wetting liquid. In capillary flow porometry, in opposition to mercury intrusion porosimetry, the wetting liquid enters spontaneously the pores of the sample ensuring a total wetting of the material, and therefore the contact angle of the wetting liquid with the sample is 0 and the previous formula can be simplified as: P= 4*γ/D.

== Measurement methods ==
=== Pressure scan ===
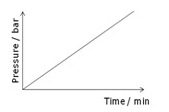
Figure 1. Continuous increase of pressure in time.

This is the traditional approach, in which the pressure increases continuously at a constant rate (figure 1), which can be modified depending the instrument and the user's requirements, and the gas flow through the sample is measured. Again, the number of data points acquired can be adjusted by the user. It is a fast and reproducible method that is generally recommended for quality control work and for samples with all pores identical. However it is important to take into account that when the samples present a complex structure and with a considerable amount of pores of different tortuosity it is possible that during the pressure scan pores with the same diameter but longer pore path are not emptied at the pressure corresponding to their diameter (if the scan is fast there is not time to allow the gas flow to displace the wetting liquid through the pore length). As a consequence, the pores with longer pore length will be report smaller pore sizes than the actual ones.

=== Pressure step/stability ===
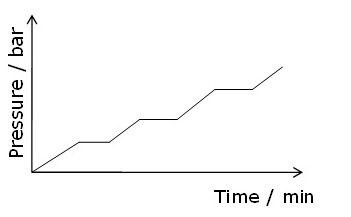
Figure 2. Increase of the pressure with respect of time in steps, holding the actual pressure for a certain time before increasing it to the next value.

The pressure/step stability method represents an alternative for the pressure scan method which permits a more accurate measurement of the pore sizes. It takes into account the different tortuosity and pore length of pores with the same diameter. The acquisition of a data point is only carried out after holding the pressure at a constant value for a user-defined time (see figure 2) and also only after the gas flow through the sample is stable, which is also defined by the user. This allows enough time for the gas flow to displace the wetting liquid in long and tortuous pores of the same diameter. Therefore the pressure step/stability method is the most recommended one for research and development applications. Additionally, the pressure step/stability measuring principle allows measuring the true First Bubble Point (FBP), in opposition to the pressure scan method, which only permits calculation the FBP at the selected flow rates.

==== Measured First Bubble Point (FBP) ====
The FBP is defined by the ASTM F-316-03 standard as the pressure at which the first continuous gas bubbles are detected. In practice FBP is associated as the largest or maximum pore size. The calculation of the FBP requires to select a certain minimum flow (e.g. 30, 50, 100 ml/min) and when it is achieved record the pressure. Then this pressure is used to calculate the FBP size. The question is to select the minimum flow through the sample and the major disadvantage is that this minimum flow is different for every sample and it is not easy to determine a priori. If a certain minimum flow is selected for the calculation it is possible that the largest pore in the sample was already open for a while before that particular flow was determined. With the step/stability method it is possible to measure the true FBP. When applying a constant gas flow, before the opening of the largest flow the pressure increases in a linear way. At the moment that the gas flow passes through the sample via the largest pore the pressure increase drops and it is this particular pressure the one that corresponds to the FBP of the sample.

== Parameters measured ==
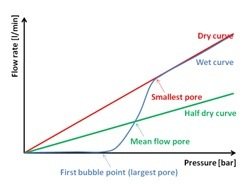
Figure 1. Parameters measured in porometry.

Capillary flow porometry permits obtaining several parameters and information in one individual and fast measurement. In general, a measurement with the wet sample (impregnated with wetting liquid) is carried out first. It is normally known as the "wet run" and the representation of the gas flow vs. the applied pressure is the so-called "wet curve". After the wet run the measurement of the same sample in dry state is carried out in order to register and analogous "dry curve". The half-dry curve is calculated and represented by dividing the flow values with respect to the applied pressure by 2 and it is also represented in the same graphic. From the representation of the three curves it is possible to identify relevant information about the sample: the maximum pore size (or first bubble point) is recorded when gas flow through the sample is detected (please see explanation about FBP above), the mean flow pore size corresponds to the pore size calculated at the pressure where the wet curve and the half dry curve meet (it corresponds at the pore size at which 50% of the total gas flow can be accounted), and the minimum pore size results from the pressure at which the wet and the dry curve meet (from this point onwards the flow will be the same because all the pores have been emptied).

Apart from these individual pore sizes, the same CFP measurement permits the representation of the cumulative filter flow distribution vs the pore size, which provides information about the percentage of the cumulative total flow through the sample that goes through the pores of a larger size than a certain value. Another information that can be obtained from the measurements is the corrected differential filter flow, which shows the flow distribution per unit of change in size, i.e. the increase in flow rate per unit increase in pore diameter. It is also defined as pore size distribution.

== Wetting liquids ==
The selection of the wetting liquid is important as it determines the measurable pore size range for a given pressure. Some common wetting liquids used in capillary flow porometry include water, alcohols, silicone oil and perfluoroethers. The use of water and/or alcohols present the disadvantage that they can evaporate and therefore the samples can partially dry before the actual porometry test begins. Also water, for instance, has a relatively high surface tension (γ= 72 dynes/cm) compared to perfluoroethers (e.g. γ= 16 dynes/cm), which means that in order to measure the same pore size using water as a wetting liquid it is required to apply 4 times more pressure than when using a perfluoroethers. Silicone oil does not present the evaporation drawback but its high viscosity makes the cleaning of the equipment parts in between different measurements not easy. Perfluoroethers have very low surface tensions and low vapour pressures, which makes them immune to the problem of evaporation. In general they do not react with samples neither cause their swelling. In principle there is no universal wetting liquid and the choice of one or another depends on the application and the type of sample to be characterized. Nevertheless it is important to use always the same wetting liquid when comparing results.
