= Concentration polarization =

Concentration polarization is a term used in the scientific fields of electrochemistry and membrane science.

== In electrochemistry ==
In electrochemistry, concentration polarization denotes the part of the polarization of an electrolytic cell resulting from changes in the electrolyte concentration due to the passage of current through the electrode/solution interface. Here polarization is understood as the shift of the electrochemical potential difference across the cell from its equilibrium value. When the term is used in this sense, it is equivalent to “concentration overpotential”. the changes in concentration (emergence of concentration gradients in the solution adjacent to the electrode surface) is the difference in the rate of electrochemical reaction at the electrode and the rate of ion migration in the solution from/to the surface. When a chemical species participating in an electrochemical electrode reaction is in short supply, the concentration of this species at the surface decreases causing diffusion, which is added to the migration transport towards the surface in order to maintain the balance of consumption and delivery of that species.

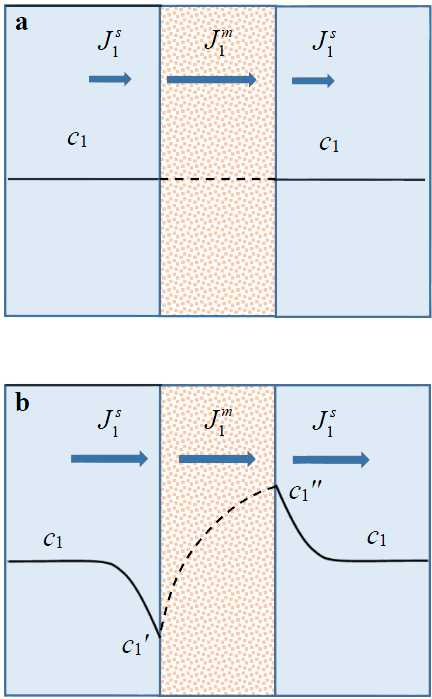
Fig. 1. Fluxes and concentration profiles in a membrane and the surrounding solutions. In Fig. a, a driving force is applied to a system initially at equilibrium: the flux of a selectively permeating species in the membrane, $J_1^m$, is higher than its flux in solution, $J_1^s$. Higher flux in the membrane causes decreasing concentration at the upstream membrane/solution interface, and increasing concentration at the downstream interface (b). Concentration gradients gives rise to diffusion transport, which increases the total flux in solution and decreases the flux in the membrane. In steady state, $J_1^s=J_1^m$.

== In membrane science and technology ==
In membrane science and technology, concentration polarization refers to the emergence of concentration gradients at a membrane/solution interface resulted from selective transfer of some species through the membrane under the effect of transmembrane driving forces. Generally, the cause of concentration polarization is the ability of a membrane to transport some species more readily than the other(s) (which is the membrane permselectivity): the retained species are concentrated at the upstream membrane surface while the concentration of transported species decreases. Thus, concentration polarization phenomenon is inherent to all types of membrane separation processes. In the cases of gas separations, pervaporation, membrane distillation, reverse osmosis, nanofiltration, ultrafiltration, and microfiltration separations, the concentration profile has a higher level of solute nearest to the upstream membrane surface compared with the more or less well mixed bulk fluid far from the membrane surface. In the case of dialysis and electrodialysis, the concentrations of selectively transported dissolved species are reduced at the upstream membrane surface compared to the bulk solution. The emergence of concentration gradients is illustrated in Figs. 1a and 1b. Fig. 1a shows the concentration profile near and within a membrane when an external driving force is just applied to an initially equilibrium system. Concentration gradients have not yet formed. If the membrane is selectively permeable to species 1, its flux ($J_1^m$) within the membrane is higher than that in the solution ($J_1^s$). Higher flux in the membrane causes a decrease in the concentration at the upstream membrane surface ($c_1'$) and an increase at the downstream surface ($c_1''$), Fig. 1b. Thus, the upstream solution becomes depleted and the downstream solution becomes enriched in regard to species 1. The concentration gradients cause additional diffusion fluxes, which contribute to an increase of the total flux in the solutions and to a decrease of the flux in the membrane. As a result, the system reaches a steady state where $J_1^s=J_1^m$. The greater the external force applied, the lower $c_1^\prime$. In electrodialysis, when $c_1'$ becomes much lower than the bulk concentration, the resistance of the depleted solution becomes quite elevated. The current density related to this state is known as the limiting current density.

Concentration polarization strongly affects the performance of the separation process. First, concentration changes in the solution reduce the driving force within the membrane, hence, the useful flux/rate of separation. In the case of pressure driven processes, this phenomenon causes an increase of the osmotic pressure gradient in the membrane, which reduces the net driving pressure gradient. In the case of dialysis, the driving concentration gradient in the membrane is reduced. In the case of electromembrane processes, the potential drop in the diffusion boundary layers reduces the gradient of electric potential in the membrane. Lower rate of separation under the same external driving force means increased power consumption.

Moreover, concentration polarization leads to:

- Increased salt leakage through the membrane
- Increased probability of scale/fouling development

Thus, the selectivity of separation and the membrane lifetime are deteriorated.

Generally, to reduce the concentration polarization, increased flow rates of the solutions between the membranes as well as spacers promoting turbulence are applied [5, 6]. This technique results in better mixing of the solution and in reducing the thickness of the diffusion boundary layer, which is defined as the region in the vicinity of an electrode or a membrane where the concentrations are different from their value in the bulk solution. In electrodialysis, additional mixing of the solution may be obtained by applying an elevated voltage where current-induced convection occurs as gravitational convection or electroconvection. Electroconvection is defined as current-induced volume transport when an electric field is imposed through the charged solution. Several mechanisms of electroconvection are discussed. In dilute solutions, electroconvection allows increasing current density several times higher than the limiting current density. Electroconvection refers to electrokinetic phenomena, which are important in microfluidic devices. Thus, there is a bridge between membrane science and micro/nanofluidics. Fruitful ideas are transferred from microfluidics: novel conceptions of electro-membrane devices for water desalination in overlimiting current range have been proposed.
