= Filter cake =

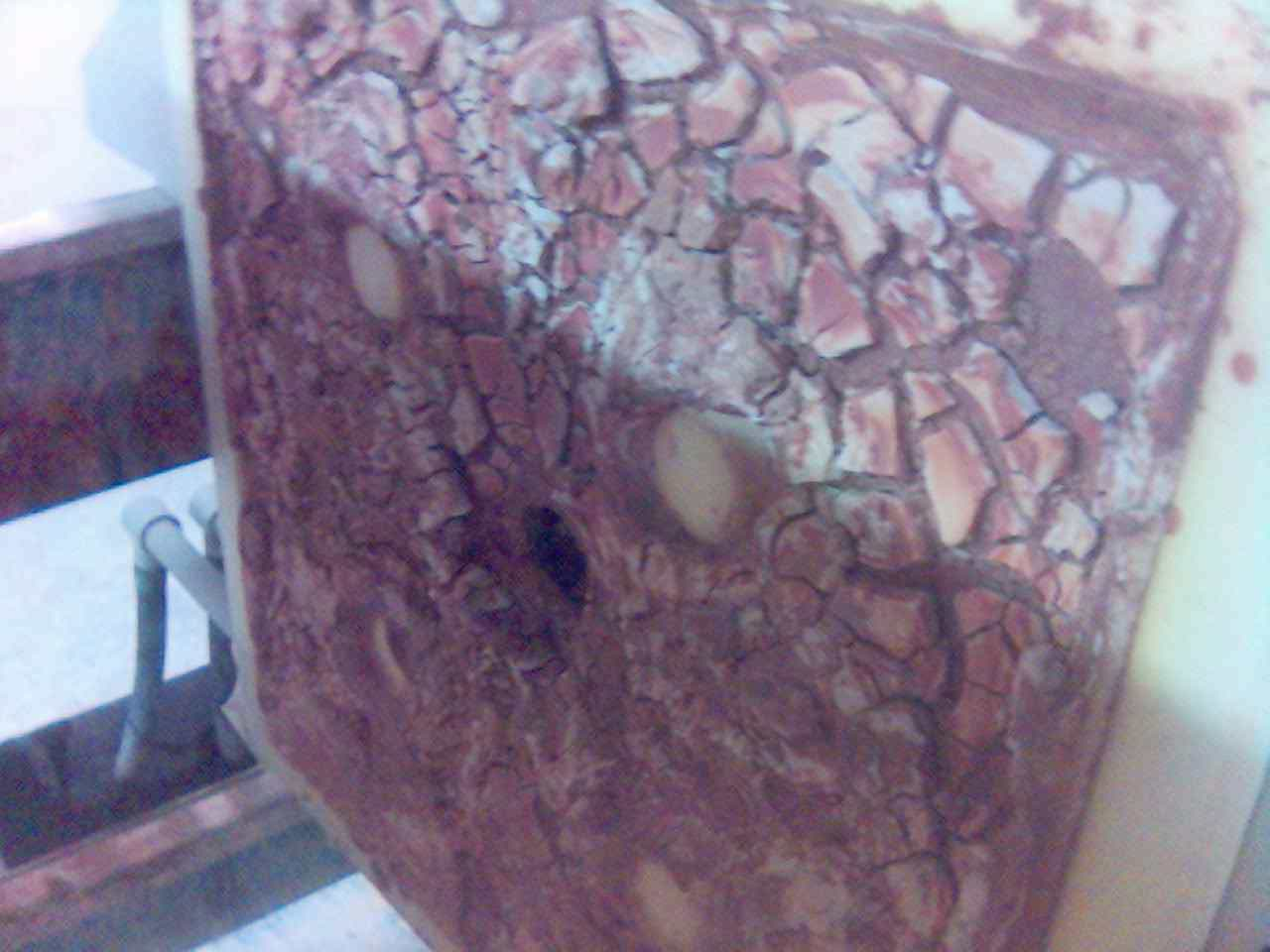
A filter cake

A filter cake is formed by the substances that are retained on a filter. Filter aids, such as diatomaceous earth or activated carbon are usually used to form the filter cake. The purpose is to increase flow rate or achieve a smaller micron filtration. The filter cake grows in the course of filtration, becoming "thicker" as particulate matter and filter aid is retained on the filter.

With increasing layer thickness, the flow resistance of the filter cake increases. After a time, the filter cake has to be removed from the filter, e.g. by backflushing. If this is not accomplished, the filtration is disrupted because the resistance of the filter cake gets too high; hence, too little of the mixture to be filtered can pass through the filter cake, and the filter becomes plugged or clogged. The specifications of the filter cake dictate the filtration method of choice.

== See also ==
- Filter press
- Press cake
- Tilting pan filter
