= Molecular weight cut-off =

Property of membranes

In ultrafiltration, the molecular weight cut-off (MWCO) or nominal molecular weight cut-off (NMWCO) of a membrane refers to the lowest molecular weight of the solute (in daltons) for which 90% of the solute is retained by (prevented from passing through) the membrane, or the molecular weight of the molecule (e.g. globular protein) that is 90% retained by the membrane.

== Details ==
This definition is not standardized, and MWCOs can also be defined as the molecular weight at which 80% of the analytes (or solutes) are prohibited from membrane diffusion.

For practical usage, the MWCO curve should be as sharp as possible.

Commercially available microdialysis probes typically have molecular weight cutoffs that range from 1,000 to 300,000 Da, and larger thresholds of filtration are measured in μm. Microdialysis may also be used to separate nanoparticles from the solutions in which they were formed. In such a separation, the eluate will consist of non-complexed reactants and components.

Ultrafiltration membrane manufacturers commonly produce and offer MWCO's of 2k, 5k, 10k, 30k, 50k, 100k, and 1,000k. Devices offered range from laboratory focused centrifugal devices (100ul to 100ml) to laboratory and bioprocessing relevant tangential flow filtration (TFF) devices (50ml to hundreds of litres).

== See also ==
- Membrane curvature
