= Brine =

Concentrated solution of salt in water

Brine (or briny water) is a high-concentration solution of salt (typically sodium chloride or calcium chloride) in water. In diverse contexts, brine may refer to the salt solutions ranging from about 3.5% (a typical concentration of seawater, on the lower end of that of solutions used for brining foods) up to about 26% (a typical saturated solution, depending on temperature). Brine forms naturally due to evaporation of ground saline water but it is also generated in the mining of sodium chloride. Brine is used for food processing and cooking (pickling and brining), for de-icing of roads and other structures, and in a number of technological processes. It is also a by-product of many industrial processes, such as desalination, so it requires wastewater treatment for proper disposal or further utilization (fresh water recovery).

== In nature ==
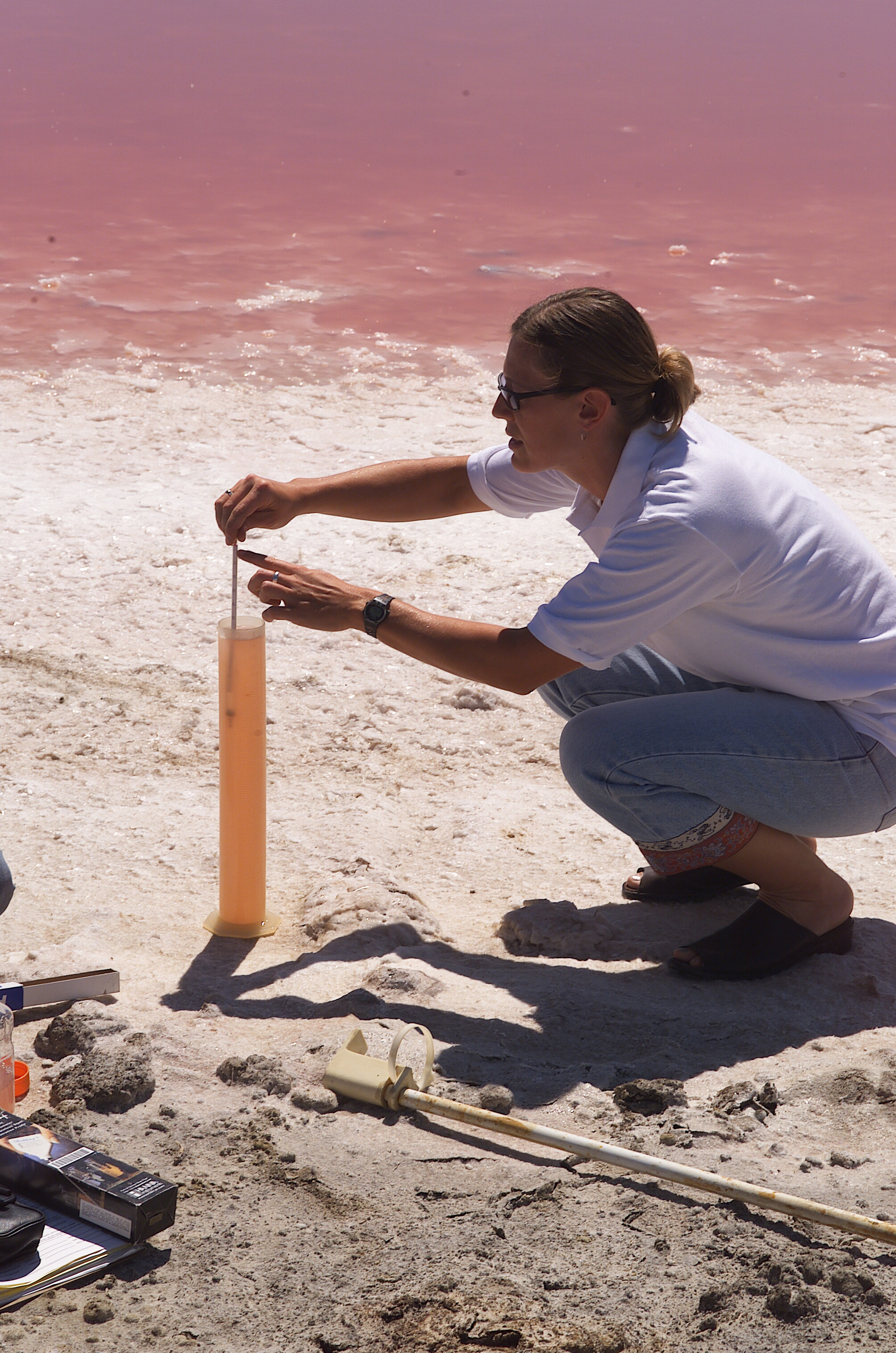
A NASA technician measures the concentration level of brine using a hydrometer at a salt evaporation pond in San Francisco.

Brines are produced in multiple ways in nature. Modification of seawater via evaporation results in the concentration of salts in the residual fluid, a characteristic geologic deposit called an evaporite is formed as different dissolved ions reach the saturation states of minerals, typically gypsum and halite. Dissolution of such salt deposits into water can produce brines as well. As seawater freezes, dissolved ions tend to remain in solution resulting in a fluid termed a cryogenic brine. At the time of formation, these cryogenic brines are by definition cooler than the freezing temperature of seawater and can produce a feature called a brinicle where cool brines descend, freezing the surrounding seawater.

The brine cropping out at the surface as saltwater springs are known as "licks" or "salines". The contents of dissolved solids in groundwater vary highly from one location to another on Earth, both in terms of specific constituents (e.g., halite, anhydrite, carbonates, gypsum, fluoride-salts, organic halides, and sulfate-salts) and regarding the concentration level. Using one of several classification of groundwater based on total dissolved solids (TDS), brine is water containing more than 100,000 mg/L TDS. Brine is commonly produced during well completion operations, particularly after the hydraulic fracturing of a well.

== Uses ==
=== Iodine and bromine mining ===
Iodine, essential for human health, is obtained on a commercial scale from iodide-rich brines. The purification begins by converting iodide to hydroiodic acid, which is then oxidized to iodine using chlorine. The iodine is then separated by evaporation or adsorption. Bromine is also obtained from brines. Akin to the production of iodine, the process exploits the easy oxidation of bromide into bromine, again using chlorine as the oxidant. The product bromine can be selectively collected by exploiting its volatility.

=== Lithium and magnesium mining ===
Major deposits of lithium are in the form of brines. Magnesium is also produced in part from waste brine from various sources, such as potash production. Crude magnesium oxides and chlorides mixtures are converted into magnesium metal by electrolysis.

=== Chlorine production ===
Elemental chlorine can be produced by electrolysis of brine (NaCl solution). This process also produces sodium hydroxide (NaOH) and hydrogen gas (H_{2}). The reaction equations are as follows:

- Cathode: 2 H^{+} + 2 e^{−} → H_{2} ↑
- Anode: 2 Cl^{−} → Cl_{2} ↑ + 2 e^{−}
- Overall process: 2 NaCl + 2 H_{2}O → Cl_{2} + H_{2} + 2 NaOH

=== Refrigerating fluid ===
Brine (primarily cheap brines based on calcium chloride and sodium chloride) is used as a secondary fluid in large refrigeration installations to transport thermal energy. It is used because the addition of salt to water lowers the freezing temperature of the solution, significantly enhancing its heat transport efficiency at low cost. The lowest freezing point obtainable for NaCl brine (called its eutectic point) is −21.1 °C (−6.0 °F) at the concentration of 23.3% NaCl by weight.

Because of their corrosive properties, salt-based brines have been replaced by organic liquids such as ethylene glycol.

Sodium chloride brine spray is used on some fishing vessels to freeze fish. The brine temperature is generally −5 °F (−21 °C). Air blast freezing temperatures are −31 °F (−35 °C) or lower. Given the higher temperature of brine, the system efficiency over air blast freezing can be higher. High-value fish usually are frozen at much lower temperatures, below the practical temperature limit for brine.

=== Water softening and purification ===
Brine is used for regeneration of ion-exchange resins. After treatment, ion-exchange resin beads saturated with calcium and magnesium ions from the treated water, are regenerated by soaking in brine containing 6–12% NaCl. The sodium ions from brine replace the calcium and magnesium ions on the beads.

=== Culinary ===
Brine is a common agent in food processing and cooking. Brining is used to preserve or season the food. Brining can be applied to vegetables, cheeses, fruit, and some fish in a process known as pickling. Meat and fish are typically steeped in brine for shorter periods of time, as a form of marination, enhancing its tenderness and flavor, or to enhance shelf period.

=== De-icing ===
In lower temperatures, a brine solution can be used to de-ice or reduce freezing temperatures on roads.

=== Quenching ===
Quenching is a heat-treatment process when forging metals such as steel. A brine solution, along with oil and other substances, is commonly used to harden steel. When brine is used, there is an enhanced uniformity of the cooling process and heat transfer.

== Desalination ==
The desalination process consists of the separation of salts from an aqueous solution to obtain fresh water from a source of seawater or brackish water; and in turn, a discharge is generated, commonly called brine.

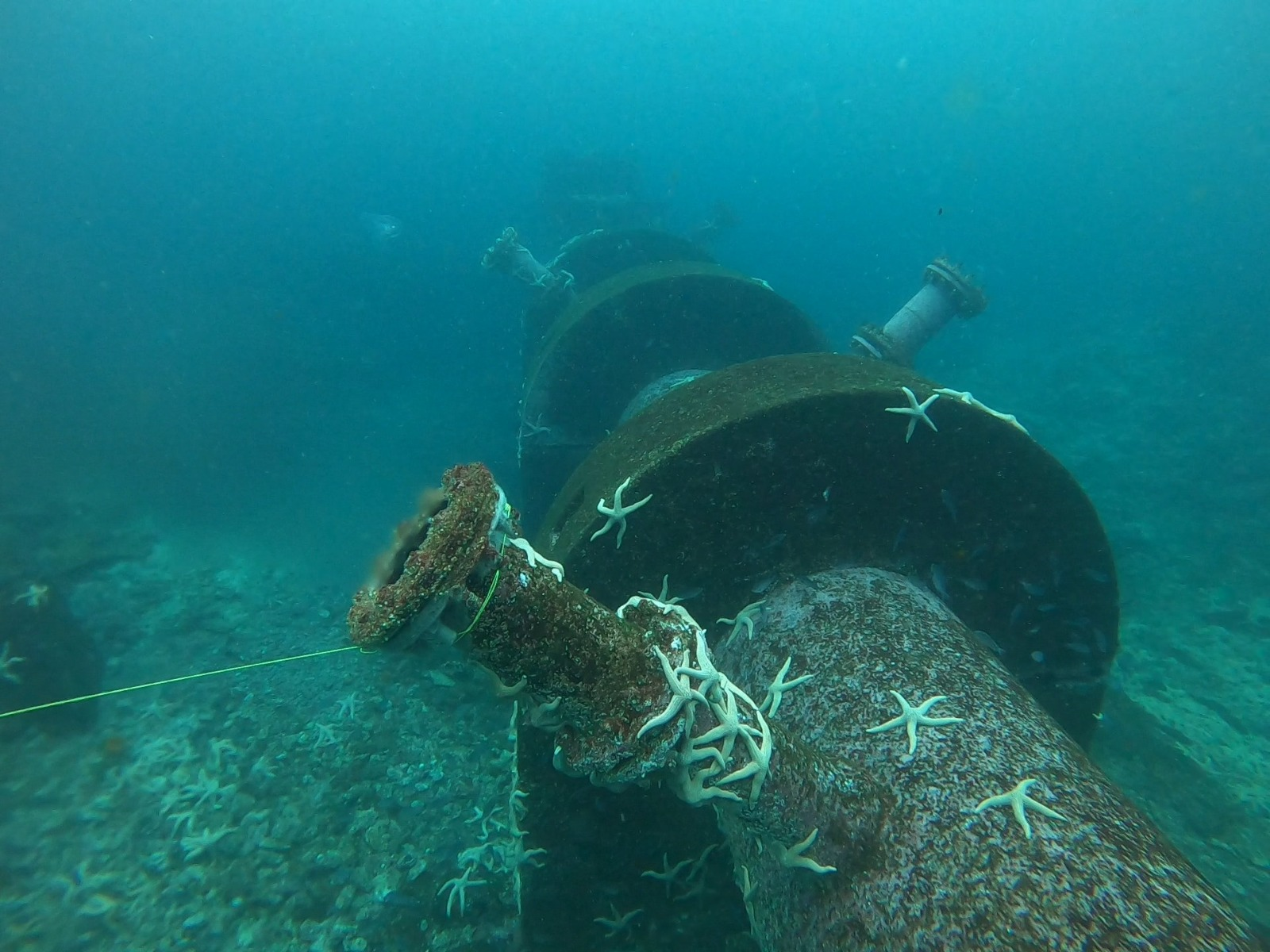
Marine brine discharge in Chile with its surrounding marine life

=== Characteristics ===
The characteristics of the discharge depend on different factors, such as the desalination technology used, salinity and quality of the water used, environmental and oceanographic characteristics, desalination process carried out, among others. The discharge of desalination plants by seawater reverse osmosis (SWRO), are mainly characterized by presenting a salinity concentration that can, in the worst case, double the salinity of the seawater used, and unlike of thermal desalination plants, have practically the same temperature and dissolved oxygen as the seawater used.

=== Dissolved chemicals ===
The discharge could contain trace chemical products used during the industrial treatments applies, such as antiscalants, coagulants, flocculants which are discarded together with the discharge, and those which could affect the physical-chemical quality of the effluent. However, these are practically consumed during the process and the concentrations in the discharge are very low, which are practically diluted during the discharge, without affecting marine ecosystems.

=== Heavy metals ===
The materials used in SWRO plants are dominated by non-metallic components and stainless steels, since lower operating temperatures allow the construction of desalination plants with more corrosion-resistant coatings. Therefore, the concentration values of heavy metals in the discharge of SWRO plants are much lower than the acute toxicity levels to generate environmental impacts on marine ecosystems.

=== Discharge ===
The discharge is generally dumped back into the sea, through an underwater outfall or coastal release, due to its lower energy and economic cost compared to other discharge methods. Due to its increase in salinity, the discharge has a greater density compared to the surrounding seawater. Therefore, when the discharge reaches the sea, it can form a saline plume that tends to follow the bathymetric line of the bottom until it is completely diluted. The distribution of the salt plume may depend on different factors, such as the production capacity of the plant, the discharge method, the oceanographic and environmental conditions of the discharge point, among others.

=== Marine environment ===
Brine discharge might lead to an increase in salinity above certain threshold levels that has the potential to affect benthic communities, especially those more sensitive to osmotic pressure, finally having an effect on their abundance and diversity.

However, if appropriate mitigation measures are applied, the potential environmental impacts of discharges from SWRO plants can be correctly minimized. Some examples can be found in countries such as Spain, Israel, Chile or Australia, in which the mitigation measures adopted reduce the area affected by the discharge, guaranteeing a sustainable development of the desalination process without significant impacts on marine ecosystems. When noticeable effects have been detected on the environment surrounding discharge areas, it generally corresponds to old desalination plants in which the correct mitigation measures were not implemented. Some examples can be found in Spain, Australia or Chile, where it has been shown that saline plumes do not exceed values of 5% with respect to the natural salinity of the sea in a radius less than 100 m from the point of discharge when proper measures are adopted.

=== Mitigation measures ===
The mitigation measures that are typically employed to prevent negatively impacting sensitive marine environments are listed below:

- A well-designed discharge mechanism, employing the use of efficient diffusers or pre-dilution of discharges with seawater
- An environmental evaluation study, which assesses the correct location of the discharge point, considering geomorphological and oceanographic variables, such as currents, bathymetry, and type of bottom, which favor a rapid mixing process of the discharges
- The implementation of an adequate environmental surveillance program, which guarantees the correct operation of the desalination plants during their operational phase, allowing an accurate and early diagnostics of potential environmental threats

=== Regulation ===
Currently, in many countries, such as Spain, Israel, Chile, and Australia, the development of a rigorous environmental impact assessment process is required, both for the construction and operational phases. During its development, the most important legal management tools are established within the local environmental regulation, to prevent and adopt mitigation measures that guarantee the sustainable development of desalination projects. This includes a series of administrative tools and periodic environmental monitoring, to adopt preventive, corrective and further monitoring measures of the state of the surrounding marine environment.

Under the context of this environmental assessment process, numerous countries require compliance with an Environmental Monitoring Program (PVA), in order to evaluate the effectiveness of the preventive and corrective measures established during the environmental assessment process, and thus guarantee the operation of desalination plants without producing significant environmental impacts. The PVAs establishes a series of mandatory requirements that are mainly related to the monitoring of discharge, using a series of measurements and characterizations based on physical-chemical and biological information. In addition, the PVAs could include different requirements related to monitoring the effects of seawater intake and those that may potentially be related to effects on the terrestrial environment.

== Wastewater ==
Brine is a byproduct of many industrial processes, such as desalination, power plant cooling towers, produced water from oil and natural gas extraction, acid mine or acid rock drainage, reverse osmosis reject, chlor-alkali wastewater treatment, pulp and paper mill effluent, and waste streams from food and beverage processing. Along with diluted salts, it can contain residues of pretreatment and cleaning chemicals, their reaction byproducts and heavy metals due to corrosion.

Wastewater brine can pose a significant environmental hazard, both due to corrosive and sediment-forming effects of salts and toxicity of other chemicals diluted in it.

Unpolluted brine from desalination plants and cooling towers can be returned to the ocean. From the desalination process, reject brine is produced, which may damage marine life and habitats. To limit the environmental impact, it can be diluted with another stream of water, such as the outfall of a wastewater treatment or power plant. Since brine is heavier than seawater and would accumulate on the ocean bottom, it requires methods to ensure proper diffusion, such as installing underwater diffusers in the sewerage. Other methods include drying in evaporation ponds, injecting to deep wells, and storing and reusing the brine for irrigation, de-icing or dust control purposes.

Technologies for treatment of polluted brine include: membrane filtration processes, such as reverse osmosis and forward osmosis; ion exchange processes such as electrodialysis or weak acid cation exchange; or evaporation processes, such as thermal brine concentrators and crystallizers employing mechanical vapour recompression and steam. New methods for membrane brine concentration, employing osmotically assisted reverse osmosis and related processes, are beginning to gain ground as part of zero liquid discharge systems (ZLD).

== Composition and purification ==
Brine consists of concentrated solution of Na^{+} and Cl^{−} ions. Other cations found in various brines include K^{+}, Mg^{2+}, Ca^{2+}, and Sr^{2+}. The latter three are problematic because they form scale and they react with soaps. Aside from chloride, brines sometimes contain Br^{−} and I^{−} and, most problematically, sulfate SO^{2−}_{4}. Purification steps often include the addition of calcium oxide to precipitate solid magnesium hydroxide together with gypsum (CaSO_{4}), which can be removed by filtration. Further purification is achieved by fractional crystallization. The resulting purified salt is called evaporated salt or vacuum salt.

== See also ==
- Brine mining – Extracting materials from saltwater
- Brinicle – Sea ice formation
- Brine pools – Anoxic pockets of high salinity on the ocean bottom
