= Aerated lagoon =

Wastewater treatment system using aeration

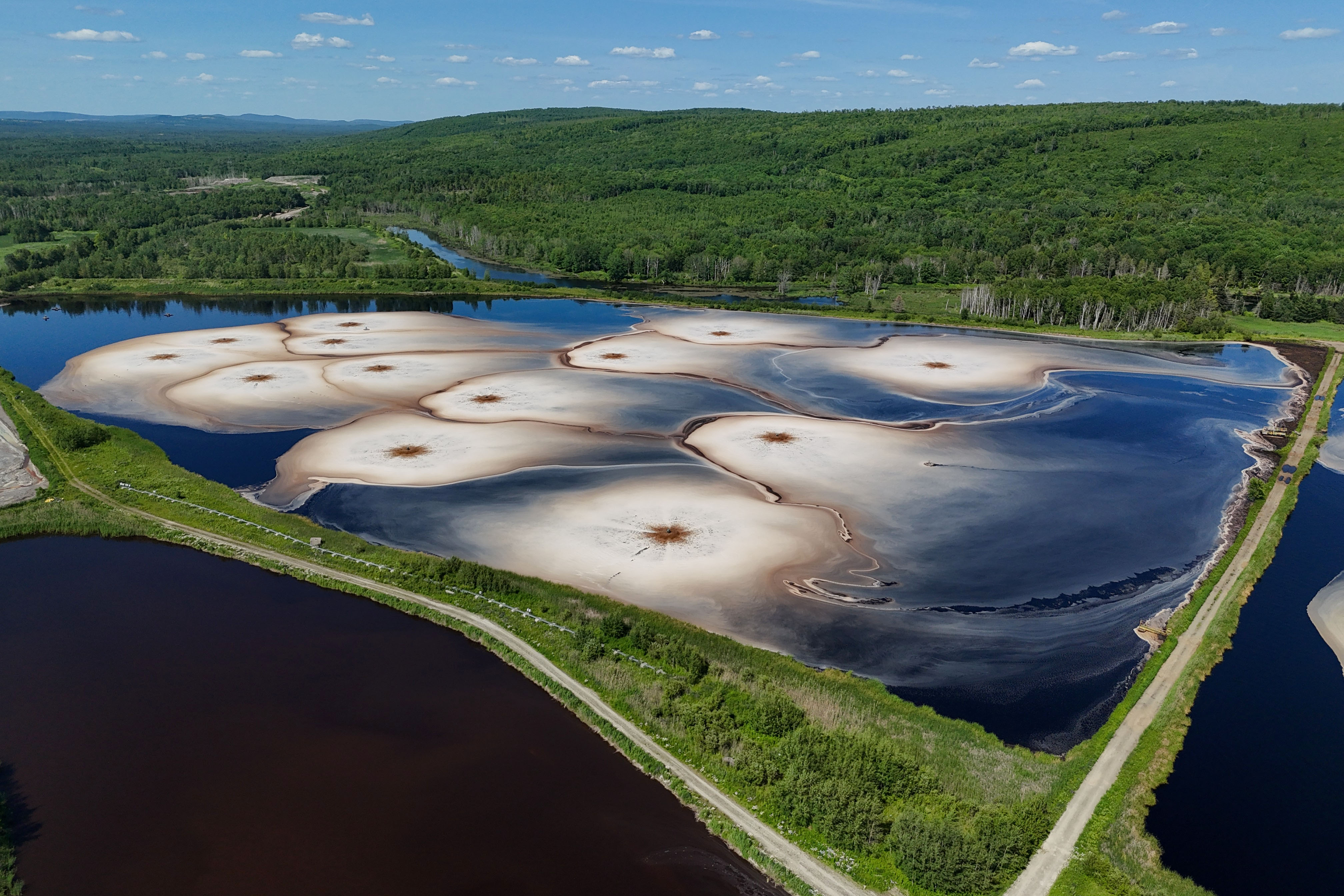
An aerated treatment lagoon in Canada

An aerated lagoon (or aerated pond) is a simple wastewater treatment system consisting of a pond with artificial aeration to promote the biological oxidation of wastewaters.

There are many other aerobic biological processes for treatment of wastewaters, for example activated sludge, trickling filters, rotating biological contactors and biofilters. They all have in common the use of oxygen (or air) and microbial action to reduce the pollutants in wastewaters.

== Types ==
- Suspension mixed lagoons, where there is less energy provided by the aeration equipment to keep the sludge in suspension.
- Facultative lagoons, where there is insufficient energy provided by the aeration equipment to keep the sludge in suspension and solids settle to the lagoon floor. The biodegradable solids in the settled sludge then degrade as in an anaerobic lagoon.

=== Suspension mixed lagoons ===
Suspension mixed lagoons flow through activated sludge systems where the effluent has the same composition as the mixed liquor in the lagoon. Typically the sludge will have a residence time or sludge age of 1 to 5 days. This means that the chemical oxygen demand (COD) removed is relatively little and the effluent is therefore unacceptable for discharge into receiving waters. The objective of the lagoon is therefore to act as a biologically assisted flocculator which converts the soluble biodegradable organics in the influent to a biomass which is able to settle as a sludge. Usually the effluent is then put in a second pond where the sludge can settle. The effluent can then be removed from the top with a low chemical oxygen demand, while the sludge accumulates on the floor and undergoes anaerobic stabilisation.

== Methods of aerating lagoons or basins ==
There are many methods for aerating a lagoon or basin:

- Motor-driven submerged or floating jet aerators
- Motor-driven floating surface aerators
- Motor-driven fixed-in-place surface aerators
- Injection of compressed air through submerged diffusers

=== Floating surface aerators ===
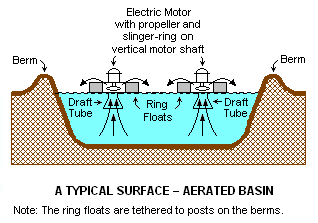
A Typical Surface-Aerated Basin (using motor-driven floating aerators)

Ponds or basins using floating surface aerators achieve 80 to 90% removal of BOD with retention times of 1 to 10 days. The ponds or basins may range in depth from 1.5 to 5.0 meters.

In a surface-aerated system, the aerators provide two functions: they transfer air into the basins required by the biological oxidation reactions, and they provide the mixing required for dispersing the air and for contacting the reactants (that is, oxygen, wastewater and microbes). Typically, the floating high speed surface aerators are rated to deliver the amount of air equivalent to 1 to 1.2 kg O_{2}/kWh. However, they do not provide as good mixing as is normally achieved in activated sludge systems and therefore aerated basins do not achieve the same performance level as activated sludge units.

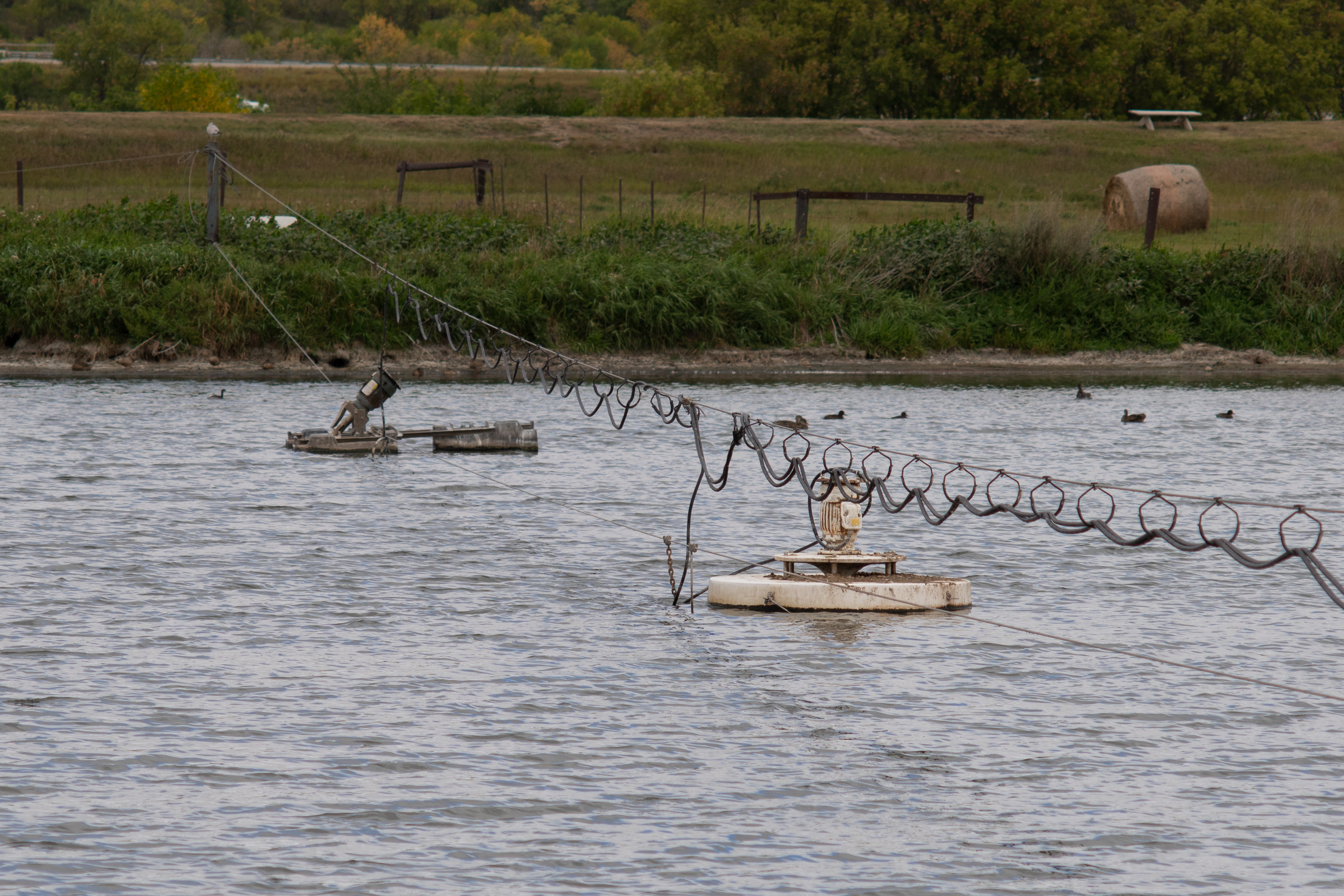
Two examples of floating surface aerators.

With low speed surface aerators SOTE (Standard Oxygen Transfer Efficiency) is higher thanks to better mixing capacity. This mixing capacity of an impeller depends highly on the impeller diameter. Low speed surface aerator present such high diameter. Therefore SOTE for low speed surface aerators is about 2 to 2.5 kg O_{2}/kWh. This is why low speed surface aerators are mostly used in sewage or industrial treatment as WWTP are bigger and sparing energy becomes very interesting.

Biological oxidation processes are sensitive to temperature and, between 0 °C and 40 °C, the rate of biological reactions increase with temperature. Most surface aerated vessels operate at between 4 °C and 32 °C.

=== Submerged diffused aeration ===
Submerged diffused air is essentially a form of a diffuser grid inside a lagoon. There are two main types of submerged diffused aeration systems for lagoon applications: floating lateral and submerged lateral. Both these systems utilize fine or medium bubble diffusers to provide aeration and mixing to the process water. The diffusers can be suspended slightly above the lagoon floor or may rest on the bottom. Flexible airline or weighted air hose supplies air to the diffuser unit from the air lateral (either floating or submerged).

== See also ==
- Industrial wastewater treatment
- List of waste water treatment technologies
- Retention basin
- Rotating biological contactor
- Sewage treatment
- Waste stabilization pond
- Water aeration
- Water pollution
