= Moyer's Landfill =

Landfill in Collegeville, Pennsylvania, US

Coordinates: 40.156244°N 75.436162°W

Moyer's Landfill was a privately owned landfill in Collegeville, Pennsylvania, United States. It was originally farmland outside the town. In the 1940s, the owner started accepting trash and municipal waste as a way to make additional money. The original landfill was 39 acres and did not have a liner to protect the land from contaminate. A liner was added to a new section in the late 1970s. Over time, the landfill accepted sewage, and industrial wastes which contained hazardous substances in addition to municipal waste. The site was closed by the EPA in 1981, and was one of the first "Superfund" sites added to the National Priorities List.

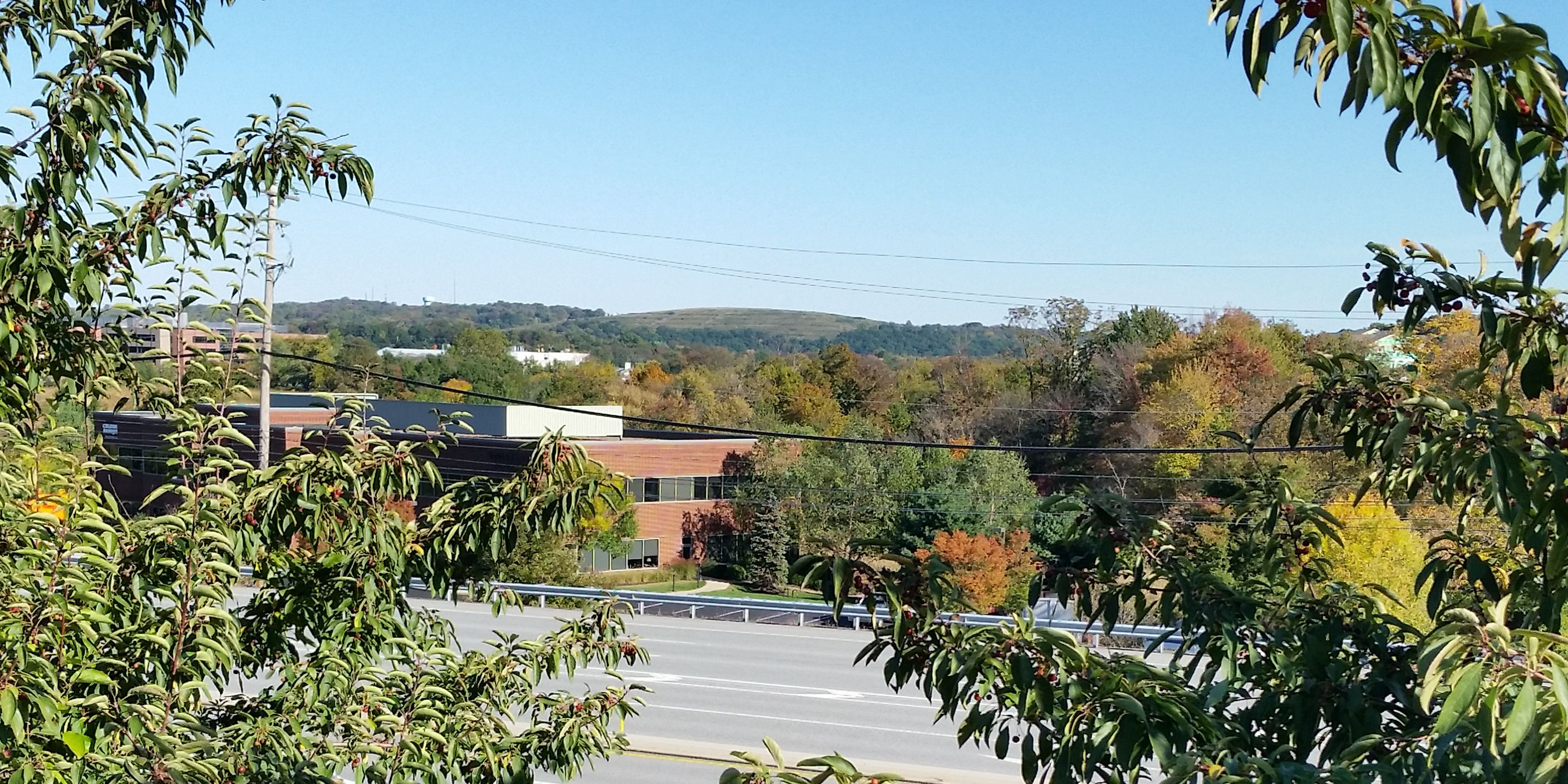
Moyer's Landfill, 2015. PA Route 29 is in the foreground.

== History ==
The Site had been operating as a municipal landfill from the early 1940s until April 1981. The landfill accepted municipal waste, sewage, and a variety of solid and liquid hazardous wastes (e.g. polychlorinated biphenyls (PCBs), products containing dioxin, paint solvents, and similar material). The original landfill was a section of the farm with no liner to prevent material from seeping into the soil. In the original landfill any waste was simply dumped and covered with dirt.

In 1972 when the Pennsylvania Department of Environmental Protection (DEP) rules became more restrictive, the site was cited for violations. To achieve compliance, pipes were added to drain leachate to two earthen basins which were pumped into trucks for treatment and disposal. Due to leakage from the basins, the system was modified to pump all the leachate to a concrete basin where it was sprayed over the top of the landfill.

In the late 1970s, the landfill owners submitted a request to enlarge the landfill which was granted. Work started to enlarge the landfill in 1977, and included an asphalt liner to protect the soil from hazardous materials. Dumping was reportedly limited to this new area from 1977 to early 1981.

Before remediation, contaminants were spread by rain water soaking into the landfill, some of which may have reached the ground water. Run-off from the landfill also carried contaminates to local streams (Skippack Creek and Perkiomen Creek).

Local residents tried for years to get the landfill closed. In the late 1970s 450 families united to try to close what they called "Mount Trashmore". They packed the local zoning board meetings, wrote letters to several environmental protection agencies, and had lawn signs printed up to close the dump.

In the lawsuit "O'LEARY v. Moyer's Landfill, Inc., 523 F. Supp. 642 (E.D. Pa. 1981)" it states "this suit was brought in part because DER has, in plaintiffs' view, been ineffective in alleviating the dangers plaintiffs perceive at the landfill".

The site was finally closed by the PA DEP in early 1981.

== Extent of the contamination ==
Analysis of the leachate dates back to 1972, this analysis was conducted to design an aerated lagoon to treat the liquid. After being designated a Superfund site, tests found heavy metals and organic chemicals. These chemicals included Benzene, toluene, Trichloroethylene, tetrachloroethylene and chlorobenzene. All of which are associated with industrial solvents. Samples from the landfill had a total of 86 priority pollutants and 16 metals. Water samples were taken from the Skippack and Perkiomen Creeks and chemicals found in the landfill were also found in both streams. A remediation study was funded at a total cost of $681,000.

The result of the remediation survey in 1985 an estimate was made that the cost of a cleanup would be $15 million and an additional $340,000 a year for operation and maintenance. By 1994 the price tag has been increased to $45 million for the cleanup.

== Completion ==
On May 27, 2014, The Environmental Protection Agency (EPA) region III removed Moyer's Landfill from the National Priorities List. The site consists of open land surrounded by trees on steep slopes. The landfill is fenced off and has leachate collection tanks. There are no development plans.

== Fourth Five-Year Review Report ==
As of May 4, 2022, the EPA has published its 4th five-year report on the Moyers Landfill Superfund. Contents include a history and overview of the site, a list of maintenance objectives, leachate discharge rates, leachate sample data, pictures, and a public notice. https://semspub.epa.gov/work/03/2329122.pdf
