= Aeration turbine =

Overview
- Type: Industrial turbine / aerator
- Function: Mixes gas (usually air) with liquid (usually water)
- Design: Mostly centrifugal; open or housed; bladed or non-bladed rotor
- Secondary functions: Destratification, agitation, pumping

Applications
- Industries: Brewing, pond aeration, sewage treatment plants, wastewater treatment
- Advantages: High efficiency, compact footprint, high reliability, lower running cost

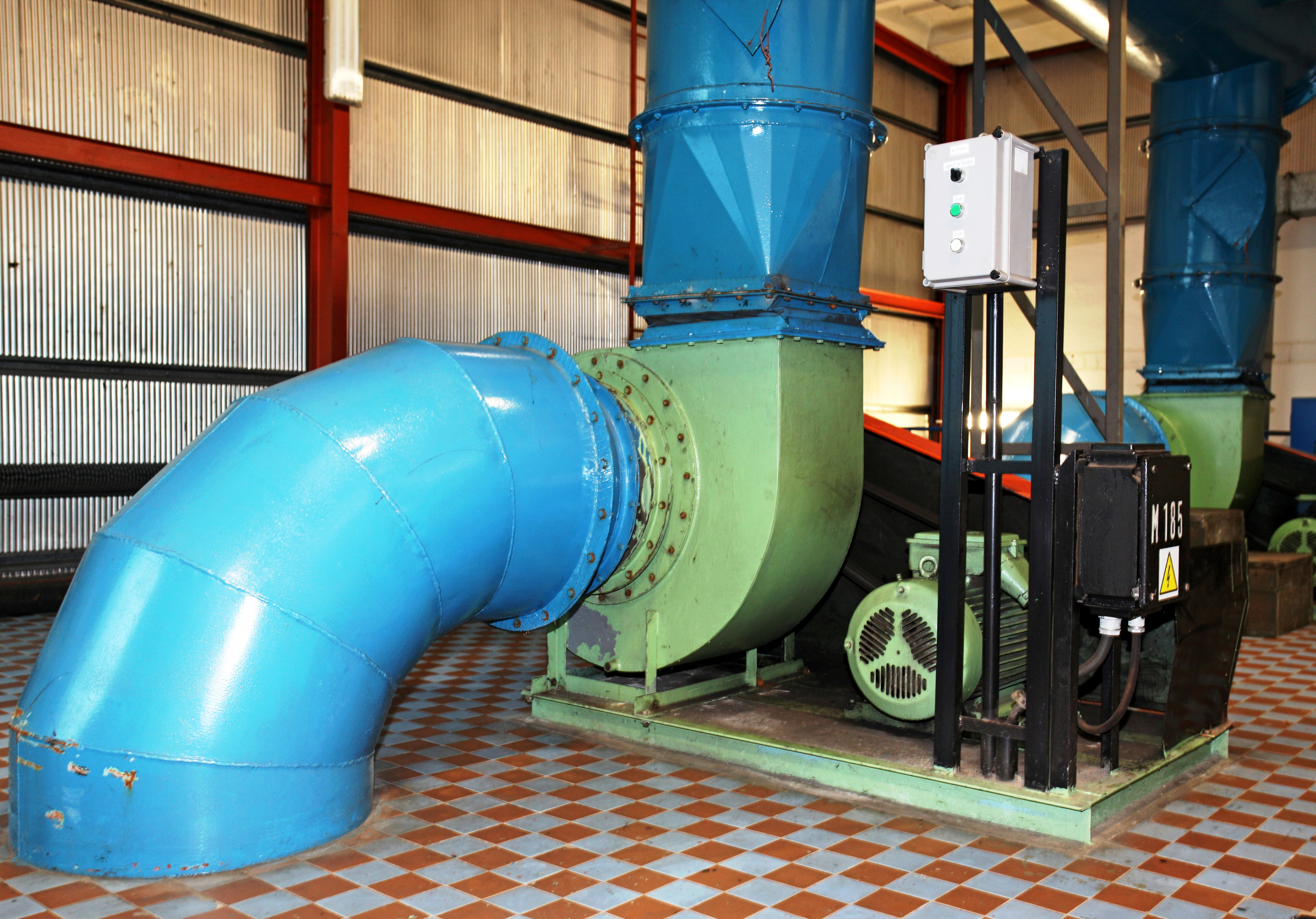
Aeration turbine with pipeline

Aeration turbines are designed to aerate and mix fluids industrially. They are foremost used in brewing, pond aeration and sewage treatment plants.

Aeration turbines are designed for mixing gases, usually air, with a liquid, usually water. They can serve additional purposes like destratification, agitator or pump.

There are numerous design variations in use or newly entering the market. Most are centrifugal, where fluid enters at the axis and exits around the perimeter of the rotor. Aeration turbines can run open or in a housing. Some designs have bladed rotors which leads to more splashing and those need to run close to the surface, which is an obvious sign of lesser efficiency.

Generally the performance efficiency of aeration turbines is very high, the space requirement is compact, both at high reliability and all those factors reduce operational cost.

The use of aeration turbines in industry is still underdeveloped especially with waste water treatment. With raising population and the growing strain on clean water supplies such environmentally friendly solutions are becoming more important.

The technology allows a more decentralized approach to waste water treatment as sewage can be oxygenised at pumping stations for bacteria to start breaking down the sewage before it even arrives at centralized processing plants.
