= Facultative =

Facultative means "optional" or "discretionary" (antonym obligate), and is used mainly in biology. It is seen in topics including:

- Facultative anaerobe, an organism that can use oxygen but also has anaerobic methods of energy production.
- Facultative biotroph, an organism, often a fungus, that can live as a saprotroph but also form mutualisms with other organisms at different times of its life cycle.
- Facultative biped, an animal that is capable of walking or running on two legs as well as walking or running on four limbs or more, as appropriate
- Facultative carnivore, a carnivore that does not depend solely on animal flesh for food but also can subsist on non-animal food. Compare this with the term omnivore
- Facultative heterochromatin, tightly packed but non-repetitive DNA in the form of Heterochromatin, but which can lose its condensed structure and become transcriptionally active
- Facultative lagoon, a type of stabilization pond used in biological treatment of industrial and domestic wastewater
- Facultative necrophage, an animal that feeds on carrion but retains the traits needed to find and consume other food sources
- Facultative parasite, a parasite that can complete its life cycle without depending on a host
- Facultative parthenogenesis, a rare biological term for when a species can switch between sexual reproduction and parthenogenesis
- Facultative photoperiodic plant, a plant that will eventually flower regardless of night length but is more likely to flower under appropriate light conditions.
- Facultative saprophyte, lives on dying, rather than dead, plant material
- Wetland indicator status for plants can include facultative (FAC), facultative wetland (FACW), and facultative upland (FACU) to distinguish types that appear in multiple regions

== See also ==
- (antonym) Obligate
- Opportunism (Biology)
