= Facultative lagoon =

Waste treatment pond

Facultative lagoons are a type of waste stabilization pond used for biological treatment of industrial and domestic wastewater. Sewage or organic waste from food or fiber processing may be catabolized in a system of constructed ponds where adequate space is available to provide an average waste retention time exceeding a month. A series of ponds prevents mixing of untreated waste with treated wastewater and allows better control of waste residence time for uniform treatment efficiency.

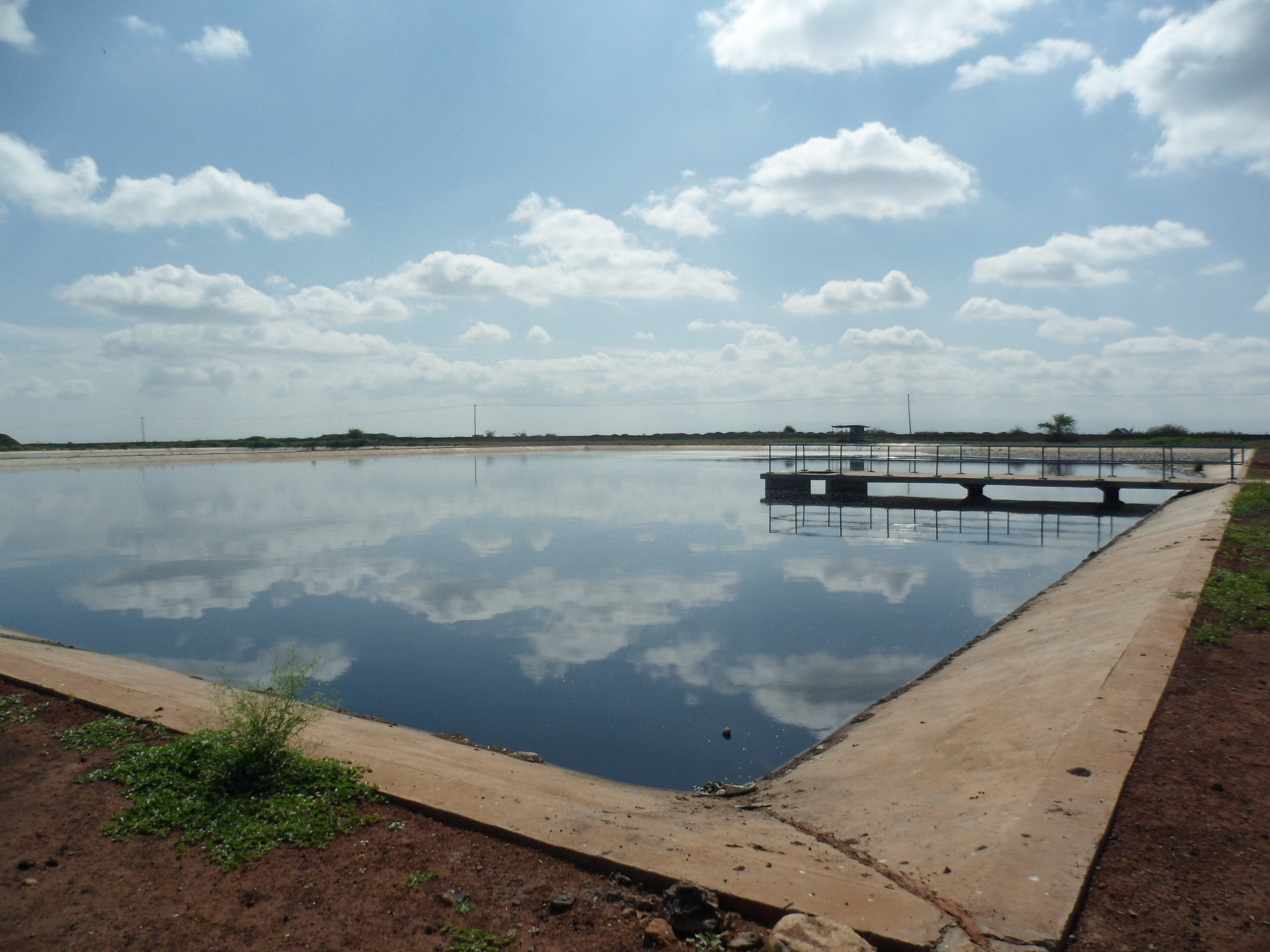
Facultative lagoon in Kenya

== Fundamentals ==
=== First pond ===
The facultative lagoon in the pond sequence functions like the primary clarifier of a conventional sewage treatment system. Heavy solids will settle to the bottom of the lagoon, and lighter solids will float. This facultative lagoon lacks the sludge removal capability of a primary clarifier, so a population of anaerobic organisms will colonize accumulated sludge on the bottom of the lagoon. The surface area of the lagoon should be large enough to provide an atmospheric oxygen transfer rate adequate to prevent anaerobic conditions on the lagoon surface. Intermediate depths of the lagoon support facultative micro-organisms capable of oxidizing both the dissolved and suspended organics from the original wastewater and the products of anaerobic catabolism on the bottom of the lagoon.

Areas with a consistently cool, but frost-free, climate may sustain facultative conditions in the first stabilization pond when treating lightly polluted water at low temperatures favorable to high concentrations of dissolved oxygen with low metabolic rates. Facultative pond stratification becomes unstable during cold weather increasing release of malodorous gas when water temperatures drop below 4 degrees Celsius (39 degrees Fahrenheit); and formation of ice on the pond surface will effectively prevent transfer of atmospheric oxygen to the pond biome. Stabilization ponds in climates with significant seasonal temperature variation may release malodorous gas during the season of rising temperatures as the pond biome consumes wastes accumulated during cold weather with increasing metabolic rates exceeding the atmospheric oxygen transfer rate at the pond surface.

=== Subsequent polishing ponds ===
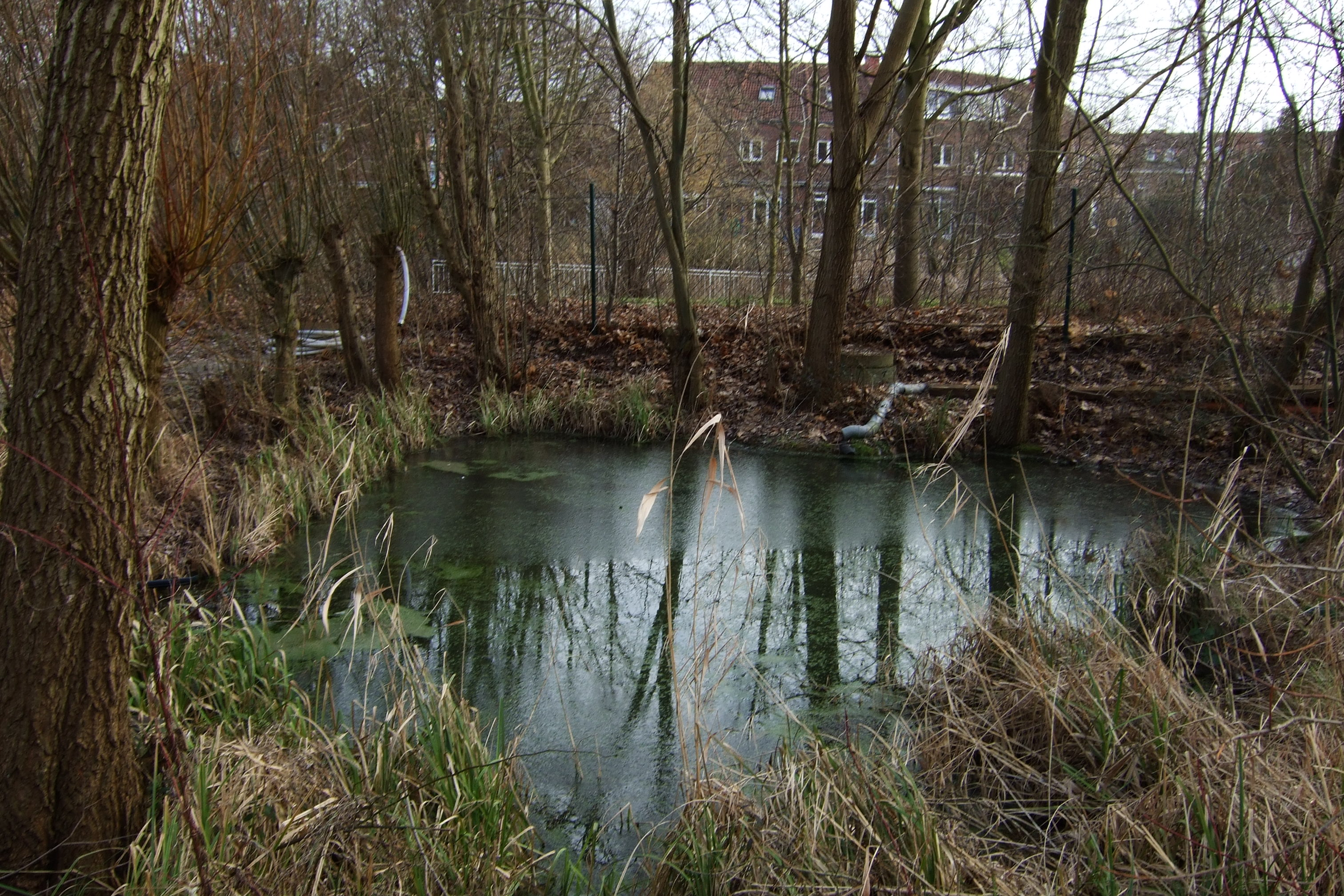
Facultative lagoon (polishing pond) providing tertiary treatment after a constructed wetland in Hamburg-Allermöhe, Germany

Overflow from the facultative lagoon may be routed through one or more polishing ponds supporting lower populations of anaerobic micro-organisms and a higher proportion of aerobic organisms adapted to survival in lower concentrations of organic material. Effluent from the final polishing pond may be suitable for discharge to natural receiving waters.

=== Oxygen transfer and algae ===
Objectionable odors are likely when the rate of oxygen transfer from the lagoon surface is less than the rate of oxygen consumption in the lower levels of the lagoon. A 1-acre (4,000 m^{2}) facultative lagoon might provide 50 pounds of oxygen per day (5 grams of oxygen per square meter per day) for biochemical catabolism. Biological activity within a facultative lagoon varies directly with temperature. Warm weather will require large oxygen transfer rates, and waste accumulation during cold weather can cause short-term warm weather oxygen requirements to exceed long-term waste loading rates. Algae can provide surface oxygen during daylight hours, but algal respiration can require additional oxygen during darkness. Ice or scum mats can reduce the oxygen transfer surface. Some facultative lagoons use mechanical surface aerators to increase atmospheric oxygen transfer, but aerator mixing depth should not re-suspend anaerobic sludge from the bottom of the lagoon. Aerator operation may be limited to periods of heavy waste loads, high temperatures, darkness, low wind velocity, or other conditions threatening to cause anaerobic conditions on the lagoon surface.

Facultative stabilization ponds stratify with an aerobic surface layer and an anaerobic layer below the surface. The aerobic surface layer limits release of malodorous gas from the anaerobic benthic zone. Algae and cyanobacteria typically grow in the aerobic zone and provide bacteria in the pond with plenty of oxygen during the daytime. However, algal photorespiration may consume oxygen during night time when it is dark. Waste stabilization ponds with large algal populations may show significant diurnal fluctuation in oxygen concentrations with a peak in the late afternoon, and a minimum at dawn.

Kinds of algae growing in treatment ponds include green, red and brown algae.

=== Minimum temperature ===
Vertical stratification including an aerobic surface layer, an anaerobic bottom layer, and a facultative intermediate layer is essential to proper functioning of a facultative lagoon ecosystem. Stratification is maintained by a thermal gradient of cool, dense water at the bottom of the lagoon overlain by warmer, less dense water on the surface. This thermal gradient becomes unstable when water reaches its maximum density at 4 degrees Celsius (39 degrees Fahrenheit). Facultative lagoons are impractical in cold climates, because the lagoons become non-functional when cooler air temperatures depress water temperatures below this critical value.

== Design considerations ==
Inert solids in wastewater will accumulate on the bottom of the lagoon and gradually reduce depth until there is inadequate room for the facultative zone. Lagoon depths between 2 and 5 feet (60 to 150 cm) are preferred for effective treatment. Parallel facultative lagoons with common polishing ponds allow wastewater treatment to continue while one lagoon is out of service for sludge removal.

Precipitation falling on the surface of the lagoons and polishing ponds will increase the volume of wastewater requiring disposal. Conversely, the volume of wastewater may be reduced by evaporation from the water surface in arid climates.

Wastewater nutrients may cause continuing growth of algae in the polishing ponds after the original wastes have been catabolized. Algae may cause measurable contribution to biochemical oxygen demand (BOD) and total suspended solids (TSS) concentrations where discharge regulations include limitations on those concentrations. The TSS contribution of algae tends to peak in the summer months, but the long-term BOD of decomposing algae may not be evident within the typical 5-day test. United States Environmental Protection Agency regulations describe facultative lagoons as providing "treatment equivalent to secondary treatment" when 65 percent of influent BOD and TSS are removed and effluent BOD and TSS concentrations do not exceed a 7-day average of 65 mg/L and a 30-day average of 45 mg/L. Individual States may establish alternative effluent limitations.

=== Similar processes ===
The facultative lagoon may be replaced by an aerated lagoon as the first pond of the series. Aerated lagoons have mechanical aerators which minimize anaerobic zones by completely mixing the lagoon to achieve catabolism through a process called extended aeration.

== See also ==
- List of waste-water treatment technologies
