= Waste stabilization pond =

Ponds designed and built for wastewater treatment

Schematic of the three main types of waste stabilization ponds (WSPs): (1) anaerobic, (2) facultative and (3) aerobic (maturation), each with different treatment and design characteristics

Waste stabilization ponds (WSPs or stabilization ponds or waste stabilization lagoons) are ponds designed and built for wastewater treatment to reduce the organic content and remove pathogens from wastewater. They are man-made depressions confined by earthen structures. Wastewater or "influent" enters on one side of the waste stabilization pond and exits on the other side as "effluent", after spending several days in the pond, during which treatment processes take place.

Waste stabilization ponds are used worldwide for wastewater treatment and are especially suitable for developing countries that have warm climates. They are frequently used to treat sewage and industrial effluents, but may also be used for treatment of municipal run-off or stormwater. The system may consist of a single pond or several ponds in a series, each pond playing a different role in the removal of pollutants. After treatment, the effluent may be returned to surface water or reused as irrigation water (or reclaimed water) if the effluent meets the required effluent standards (e.g. sufficiently low levels of pathogens).

Waste stabilization ponds involve natural treatment processes which take time because removal rates are slow. Therefore, larger areas are required than for other treatment processes with external energy inputs. Waste stabilization ponds described here use no aerators. High-performance lagoon technology that does use aerators has much more in common with the activated sludge process. Such aerated lagoons use less area than is needed for traditional stabilization ponds and are also common in small towns.

== Fundamentals ==
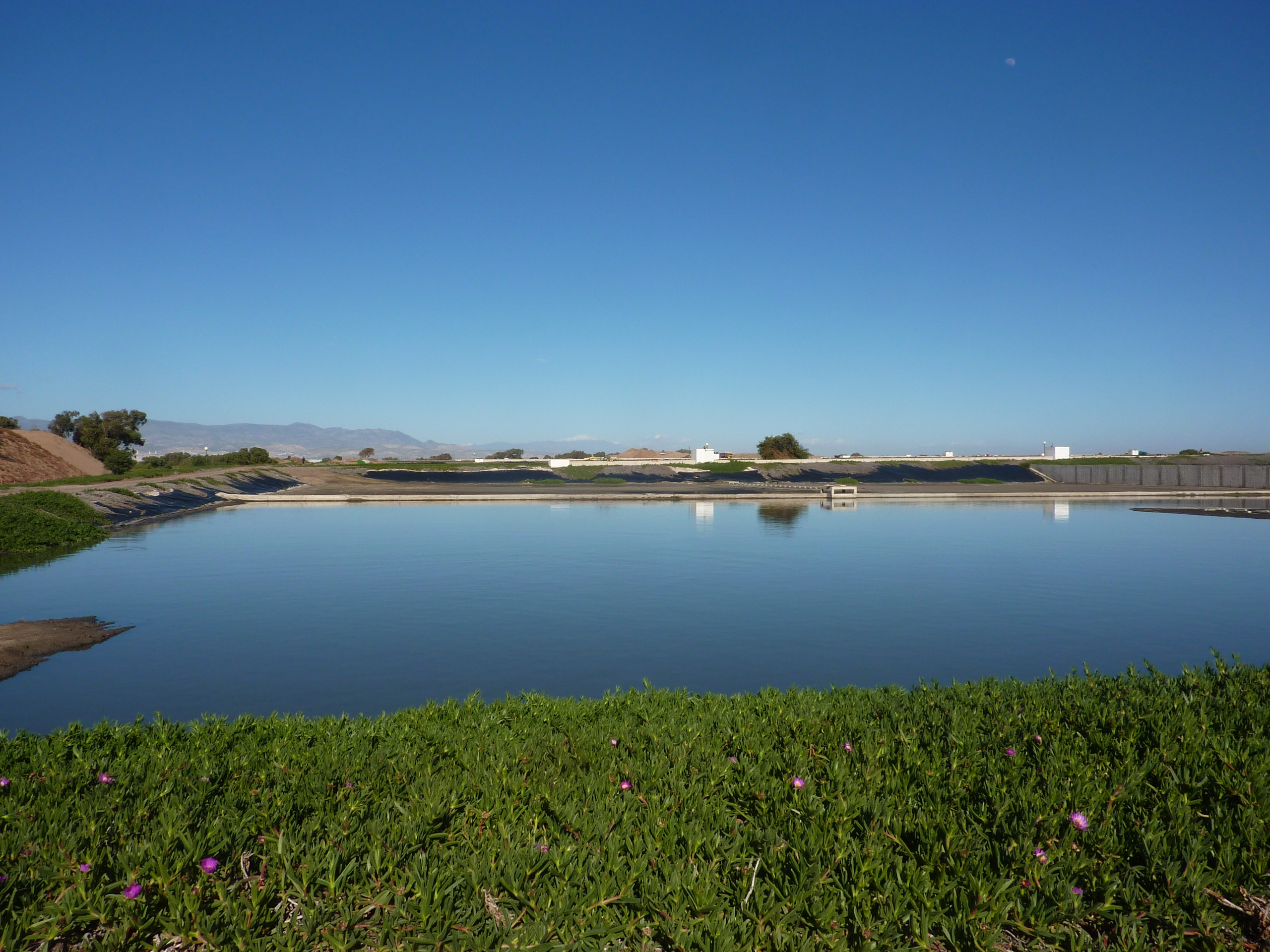
Waste stabilization pond at Grand Agadir, Morocco (Station M’zar)

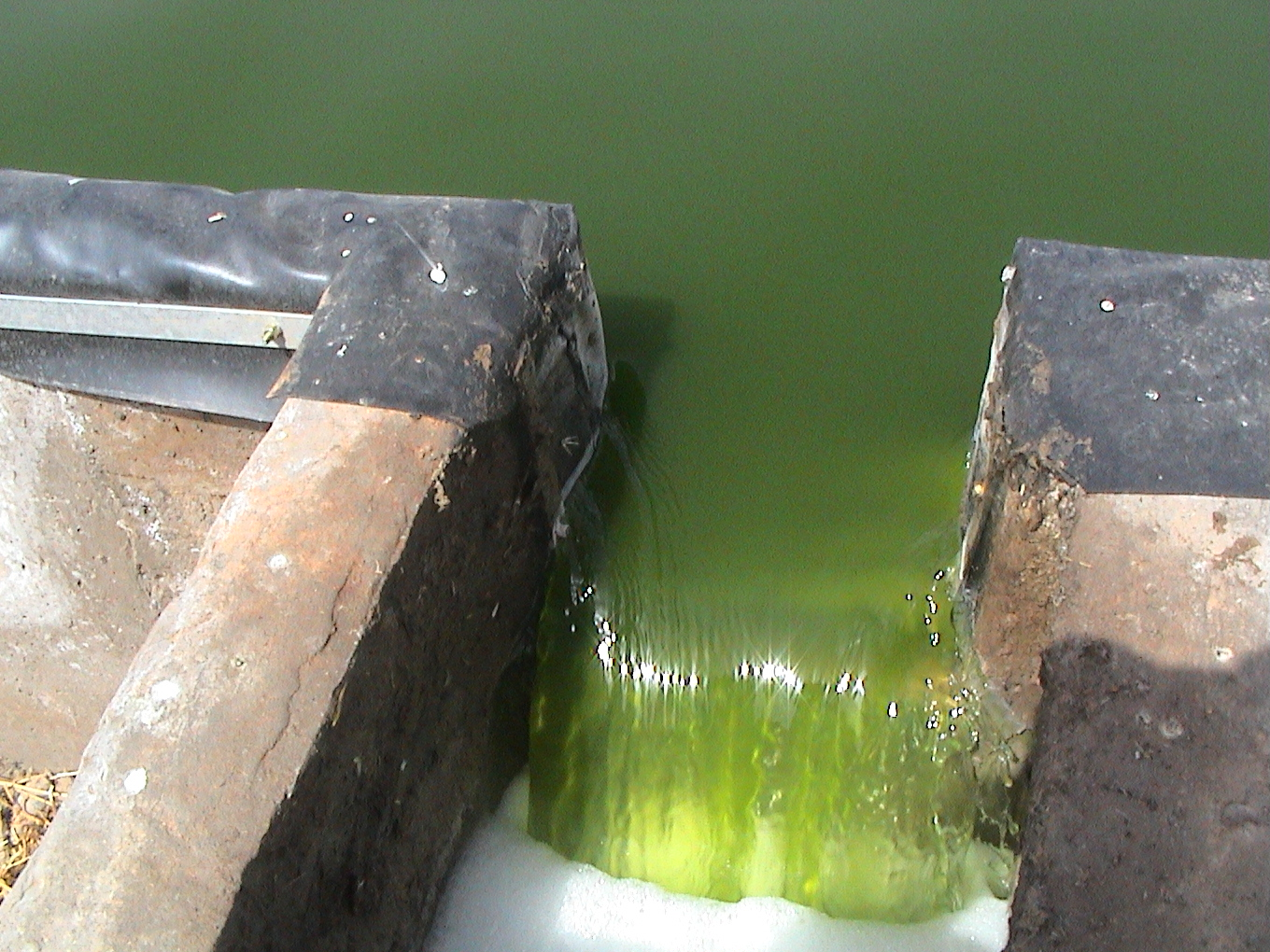
Effluent from a high rate algae pond and two maturation ponds in Attaouia, Morocco. Note the green color, caused by algae.

=== Concept of stabilization ===
Sewage and many types of industrial wastewaters contain organic matter. If wastewater is discharged untreated into surface water bodies (for instance, rivers and lakes), their organic matter serves as food for microorganisms living in the surface waters. These organisms use the organic matter for energy generation for their growth and reproduction. This is done via their respiration, in which they convert the organic matter into carbon dioxide and water.

However, these organisms use oxygen in their respiration, thus reducing the oxygen concentration in the surface waters. This is one of the main water pollution problems, which may affect the surface water biota, including fish.

Waste stabilization ponds reproduce these biological phenomena before they take place in the receiving surface water and cause the pollution problems due to oxygen consumption. The ponds receive wastewater, and, by natural processes similar to those that take place in the surface waters, carry out stabilization of the organic matter inside them, as part of the treatment. This is why they received the name of waste stabilization ponds.

=== Microorganisms ===
The reactions take place by the joint participation of several microorganisms living within the pond. The organic matter is measured as biochemical oxygen demand (BOD). BOD values in the pond effluent are lower than in the influent, reflecting the removal of organic matter. This pond biome uses organic matter from the wastewater as food.

Nutrients are converted to cell material and energy for life processes including reproduction and growth of living cells. Some of these living cells will be consumed by organisms at higher trophic levels within the pond. In ponds, the most important group of microorganisms are bacteria, which utilize most of the organic matter from the wastewater, but also consume oxygen.

Algae are another essential group of microorganisms. They do not depend on the organic material from the influent. Instead, they undertake photosynthesis, in which they produce the organic matter for their own consumption and, very importantly here, they release oxygen. The excess oxygen released supports the respiration done by the aerobic organisms in the pond. Atmospheric oxygen is also dissolved into the liquid, which assists in maintaining an aerobic layer on the top of the pond surface.

=== Oxygen levels ===
The oxygen concentration varies in the liquid column: Close to the surface, concentrations are high and support the growth of aerobic organisms. Close to the pond bottom, sunlight penetration is low, and thus photosynthetic activity is reduced. This causes oxygen concentrations to be low there. Finally, inside the sediments in the bottom layer, there is no oxygen at all. Here, organic matter is removed by digestion undertaken by anaerobic organisms.

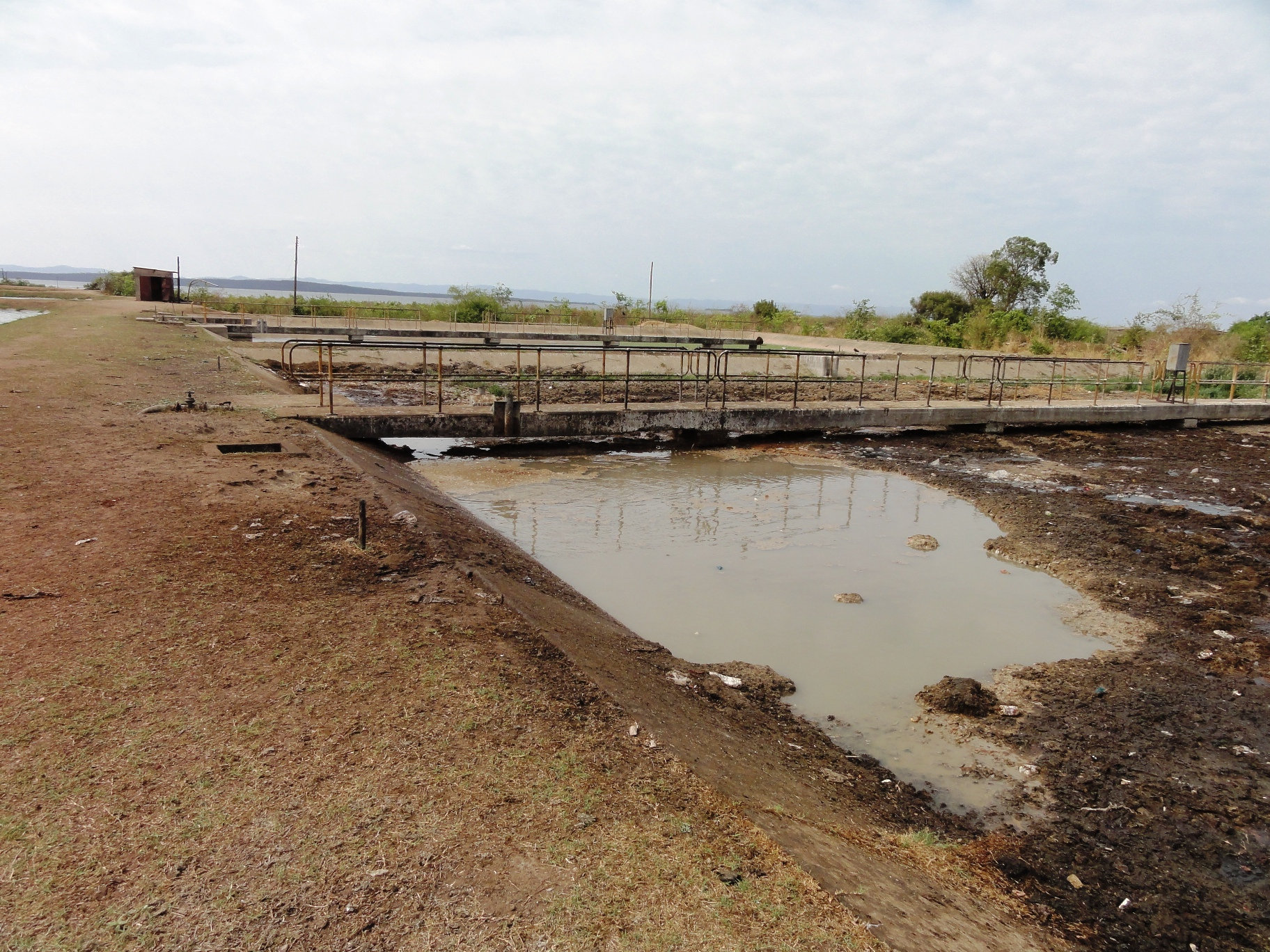
A poorly maintained anaerobic treatment pond in Kariba, Zimbabwe (sludge needs to be removed)

=== Removal of pathogens ===
Pathogens can be efficiently removed in waste stabilization ponds. The process relies mostly on maturation ponds for removal of pathogens, although some removal also takes place in the other ponds of the system. The higher the number of ponds in the series, the more efficient the pathogen removal.

Removal of pathogenic bacteria and viruses occurs mainly by inactivation. Pathogens are inactivated as a result of a complex interaction of mechanisms that involve pH (the pH value in ponds is high because of algal photosynthesis), temperature, ultraviolet radiation present in the sunlight that reaches the pond surface and photooxidative reactions taking advantage of high dissolved oxygen concentrations.

Protozoan pathogens are present in the wastewater in the form of cysts or oocysts. Helminths (worms) are present in the form of eggs. The protozoan and helminth pathogens can be removed by the mechanism of sedimentation. Very high removal efficiencies may be achieved, especially if maturation ponds are part of the treatment system. In that case, the final pond effluent may be in compliance with World Health Organization guidelines for irrigating with treated wastewaster (or "reclaimed water"). However, sludge (sediment) from the ponds may be heavily contaminated with helminth eggs, which may survive even after several years of storing the sludge inside of the pond.

== Types ==
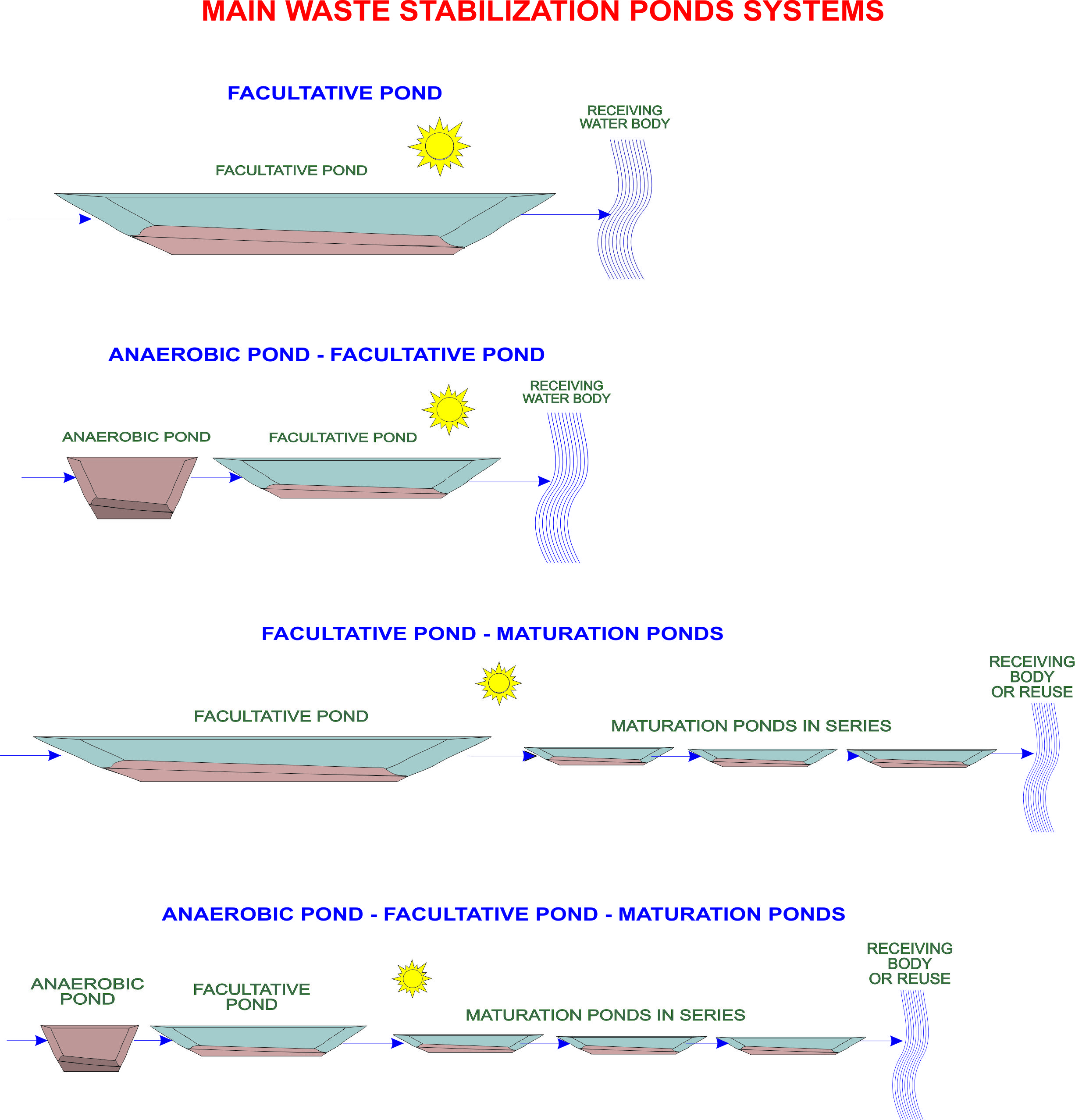
Main configurations of waste stabilization pond systems

Waste stabilization ponds consist of man-made basins comprising a single or several series of anaerobic, facultative or maturation ponds. The presence or absence of oxygen varies with the three different types of ponds, used in sequence. Anaerobic waste stabilization ponds have very little dissolved oxygen, thus anaerobic conditions prevail. The second type of pond, facultative stabilization ponds, sustain an aerobic surface habitat above an anaerobic benthic habitat. Maturation ponds offer aerobic conditions throughout, from the surface to the bottom.

The main configurations of pond systems are:

- Facultative pond only;
- Anaerobic pond followed by a facultative pond;
- Facultative pond followed by maturation ponds in series;
- Anaerobic pond followed by a facultative pond followed by maturation ponds in series.

If an anaerobic pond is present, part of the suspended solids from the wastewater settles, thus removing the organic matter (BOD) contributed by these solids. Additionally, some of the dissolved organic matter is removed by anaerobic digestion. During the second stage in the facultative pond, most of the remaining BOD is removed mainly by the heterotrophic bacteria that receive oxygen from the photosynthesis undertaken by algae. The main function of the tertiary stage in maturation ponds is the removal of pathogens, although it may also assist in nutrient reduction (i.e. nitrogen). However, nitrogen fixation by algae living in stabilization pond systems may increase nitrogen levels in stabilization pond effluent.

=== Anaerobic ponds ===
Anaerobic ponds receive raw wastewater. They have a smaller surface area compared to facultative ponds and are also deeper (usually 3.0 to 5.0 m). The depth decreases the influence of oxygen production by photosynthesis, leading to anaerobic conditions. Depending on loading and climatic conditions, these ponds are able to remove between half to two thirds of the influent BOD. This significantly decreases the load of organic matter that goes to the facultative ponds, and thus decreases their required size. Anaerobic stabilization ponds have the disadvantage of potentially releasing malodorous gases. This especially includes hydrogen sulfide with an odor of rotten eggs, if the system has operational problems.

The first pond biome in a series of stabilization ponds digests the putrescible solids suspended in the wastewater being treated. Anaerobic ponds allow solids to settle down at the bottom as sludge. This settling removes a portion of the particulate organic material. A large fraction of the settled solids will accumulate close to the point where wastewater enters the pond. Therefore, anaerobic ponds must be designed to be far deeper than either aerobic or facultative ponds. The depth decreases the oxygen levels so anaerobic bacteria can efficiently digest the waste. Anaerobic ponds contain anaerobic organisms which are able to break down complex organic waste into basic compounds that are less harmful to the environment. Because anaerobic organisms can only thrive in warm temperatures, anaerobic ponds are not suitable in temperate or cold climates.

Sludge accumulates at the bottom of the anaerobic ponds and needs to be removed every few years.

=== Facultative ponds ===
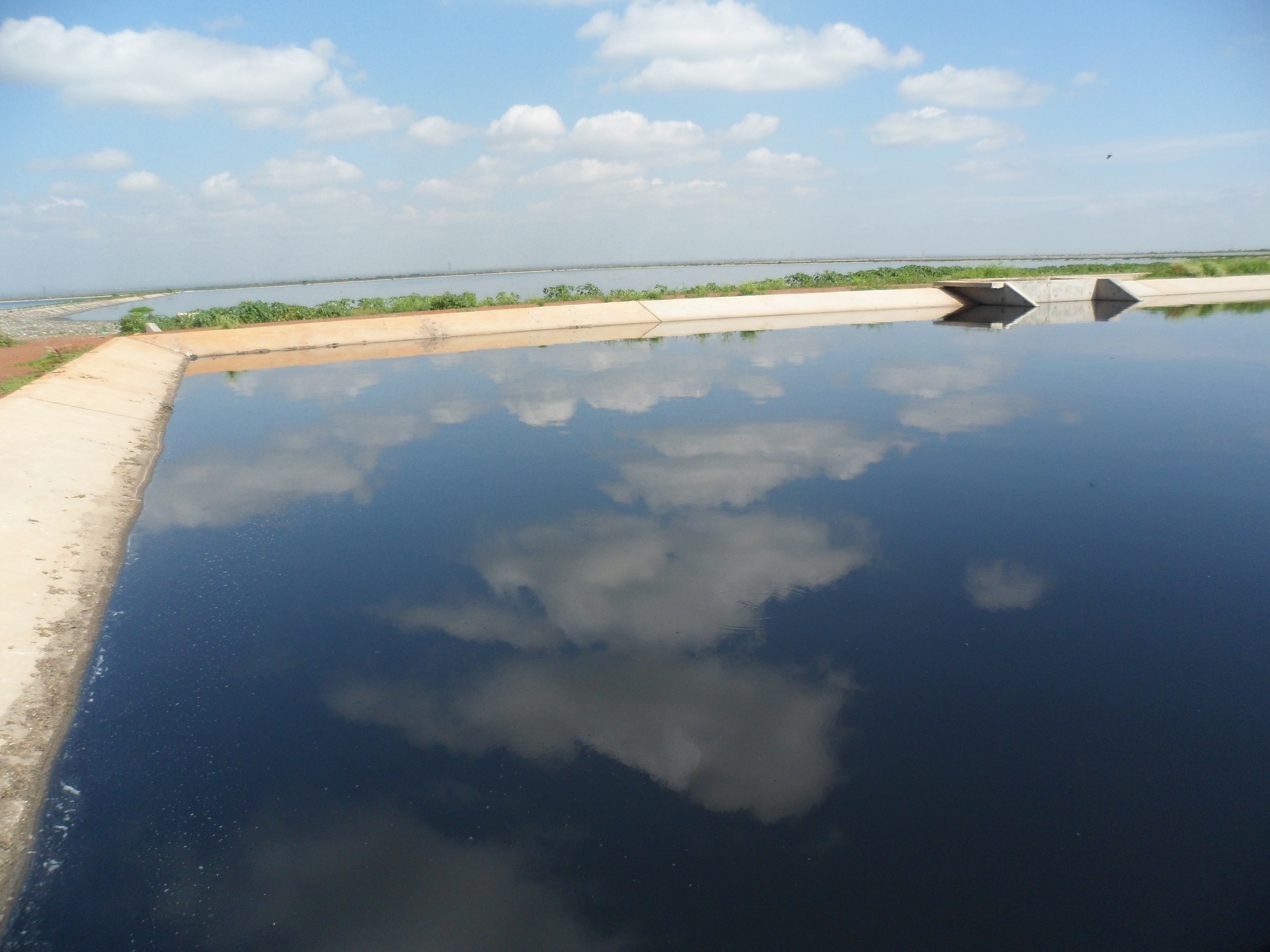
Facultative pond in Ruai, Kenya

Facultative stabilization ponds that receive raw wastewater are called primary facultative ponds. If they are receiving wastewater that has already been treated in anaerobic ponds, they are called secondary facultative ponds. Facultative stabilization ponds may also be used for treatment following other types of treatment processes such as upflow anaerobic sludge blanket (UASB) reactors, oxidation ditches or aerated lagoons. Compared with anaerobic ponds, facultative ponds are shallower (1.5 to 2.5 m deep) and have much larger surface areas. The surface area is important because it allows atmospheric oxygen to dissolve and sunlight radiation to penetrate the water. This allows for photosynthetic activity to occur which produces more oxygen.

In most ponds both bacteria and algae are needed in order to maximize the decomposition of organic matter and the removal of other pollutants. Algae produce oxygen (photosynthesis) and also consume oxygen (respiration), but they leave an excess of oxygen that can then be used by aerobic bacteria for respiration and for the processes of oxidation (or stabilization) of the organic matter in the wastewater.

Several types of invertebrates are present in the ponds where they control the population of algae, which then settles to the bottom. Heavy algal growth may block sunlight from penetrating into the pond. This decreases the potential for photosynthesis to contribute oxygen to the pond.

In the treatment of sewage, systems composed of anaerobic ponds followed by facultative ponds usually have overall BOD removal efficiencies between 75 and 85%. Higher efficiencies are difficult to achieve because the effluent contains high concentrations of particulate organic matter, in the form of algae, naturally produced during treatment.

The sludge comprising the sediment layer in the pond undergoes anaerobic digestion, and may accumulate for several years without needing removal.

=== Maturation ponds ===
Some additional removal of organic matter and other pollutants may be achieved in maturation ponds. These ponds are only included in the treatment line when high efficiencies of pathogen removal are required, either for discharge of the treated effluent in surface water bodies, or for use for irrigation or aquaculture. They are usually used after facultative ponds, but may also follow other treatment processes, such as upflow anaerobic sludge blanket (UASB) reactors. They could also be placed after an activated sludge process.

Maturation ponds must be shallow (around 1.0 m depth or less) with a great surface area so that more oxygen can dissolve into the water giving the bacteria enough oxygen to properly function. Shallow ponds benefit from high photosynthetic activity arising from the penetration of solar radiation. The pH values are high because of intense photosynthesis, and ultraviolet radiation penetration takes place in the upper layers. Both of these factors promote the removal of pathogenic bacteria and viruses. Given the high surface area of the maturation ponds, protozoan cysts and helminth eggs are also removed, with sedimentation as the main mechanism.

Sludge accumulation is very low in maturation ponds.

Very high pathogen removal efficiencies may be achieved, depending on several factors: temperature, hydraulic retention time (the amount of time the liquid remains in the system - from entrance to exit), the number of ponds in the series, the presence of baffles and the depth of ponds.

Maturation ponds may be used in combination with a rainwater reservoir to form an ecological, self-purifying irrigation reservoir.

== Application and suitability ==
Waste stabilization ponds design criteria have changed very little over the years. Construction may be done by local contractors in small towns.

Waste stabilization ponds work well in nearly all environments and can treat most types of wastewater. They are particularly well-suited for tropical and subtropical countries because the intensity of the sunlight and temperature are key factors for the efficiency of the removal processes. Ponds are used throughout the world. In many countries and regions ponds are the most widely used treatment process. For this reason, they are one of the processes recommended by WHO for the treatment of wastewater for reuse in agriculture and aquaculture, especially because of their effectiveness in removing nematodes (worms) and helminth eggs.

Ponds cannot achieve very high efficiencies in the removal of organic matter, and usually have low capacities for removing nitrogen and phosphorus. The effluent usually has high concentrations of suspended solids, resulting from algal production in the ponds. Therefore, ponds are not a suitable technology in areas where stringent discharge standards exist, unless additional stages of post treatment are included.

Since ponds require large areas, they may not be practical in proximity to towns where land is expensive. A suitable topography and a suitable soil structure are also desired, in order to reduce construction costs.

== Operation and maintenance ==
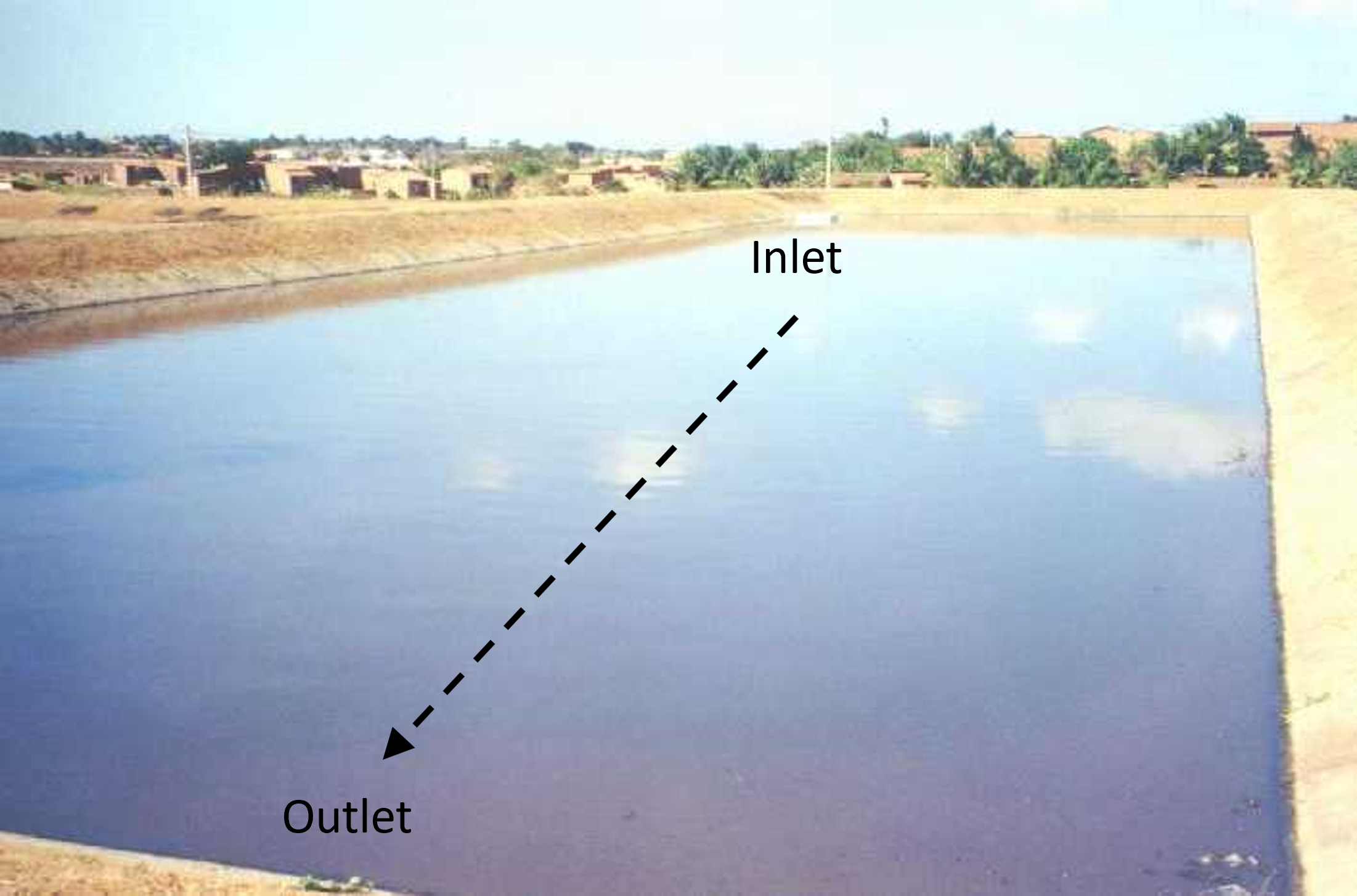
Facultative pond at Parque Fluminense Treatment Plant in Ceara, Brazil

Regarding operation and maintenance, the tasks performed by the operational staff are very simple and do not require special skills. Additionally, there is no energy consumption for aeration, no need of heavy equipment maintenance and no frequent sludge removal, sludge treatment and disposal.

Ponds require very little maintenance, since there is no heavy electric or mechanical equipment that requires attention. The only routine maintenance needed is on the preliminary treatment (cleaning of screens and removal of sand), routine checking of pipes, weirs and other hydraulic structures, and removal of unwanted vegetation growth in embankments.

=== Sludge removal ===
Sludge accumulates inside the ponds. It needs to be removed only in the interval of several years. This is an important advantage of the system. However, when removal is necessary, it is usually an expensive and labor-intensive operation. Removal is more frequent in anaerobic ponds (every few years), because of their smaller volume and lower capacity to store the sludge, compared with facultative ponds. In facultative ponds, sludge removal may be necessary only in intervals around 15 to 25 years. In maturation ponds, sludge accumulation is very low.

Sludge removal, also called desludging, may be done in two basic ways: (i) interrupting the operation of the pond for desludging or (ii) keeping the pond in operation while desludging. In the first case, the influent wastewater to the pond to be desludged is closed. Afterwards, the pond is drained and the bottom sludge is left for open drying for several weeks. During this period, the wastewater to be treated needs to be diverted to other ponds in the system. After the sludge has dried, its removal may be done manually (very laborious in large ponds) or mechanically using tractors or mechanical scrapers. In the second alternative, when the pond is left in operation during desludging, the removed sludge will be wet and will require further drying. This is undertaken outside the pond. Sludge removal can be by suction and pumping using vacuum trucks (only for small ponds), dredging, pumping from a raft or involving other mechanical equipment. In either case, the amount of sludge to be removed is very high, considering its accumulation over a period of years. This process is very laborious, expensive and requires careful planning.

== Costs ==
In the selection of a wastewater treatment process, besides the technical aspects that are relevant to each alternative, also cost factors play a very important role. The latter can be basically divided into (i) construction costs and (ii) operation and maintenance costs. Waste stabilization ponds are usually considered a cheap alternative in terms of construction costs. However, the final costs will depend essentially on the size of ponds, presence of maturation ponds in the process configuration, topography, soil conditions, groundwater level and land cost.

Because all these elements are site-specific, it is difficult to generalize overall construction costs. In most cases these will be lower compared with other wastewater treatment alternatives. Depending on the specific situation of the area, construction costs can increase and level up with other technologies.

Waste stabilization ponds are one of the cheapest wastewater treatment processes in terms of operation and maintenance.

== Comparison with other infrastructure ==
The following types of water and wastewater infrastructure may superficially resemble waste stabilization ponds, but are not the same:

- Aerated lagoons rely upon mechanical aerators to provide oxygen to stabilize organic matter. Aerated lagoons may be used as the first stage in the treatment line instead of anaerobic ponds to limit release of malodorous gases, but with energy and maintenance requirements causing higher operating costs.
- Constructed wetlands are designed to improve water quality by supporting rooted vegetation arranged to physically remove solids and particulate material while removing soluble nutrients in the water by uptake into plant tissue and supplying oxygen to the water to reduce BOD.
- Retention basins are used to manage stormwater runoff to prevent flooding and downstream erosion, and improve water quality in an adjacent river, stream, lake or bay. Detention basins are similar but are "dry ponds" designed to temporarily hold runoff as a flood control measure.
- Infiltration basins are ponds designed to percolate their contents into underlying permeable soils.
- Settling basins are designed to separate solids from wastewaters without provision for treatment of those solids.

== See also ==
- Industrial wastewater treatment
- Lagoon
- List of waste water treatment technologies
- Natural swimming pond
- Organisms used in water purification
