= Diffuser (sewage) =

Aeration device

An air diffuser or membrane diffuser is an aeration device typically in the shape of a disc, tube or plate, which is used to transfer air and with that oxygen into the sewage or industrial wastewater. Oxygen is required by microorganisms/bacteria residents in the water to break down the pollutants. Diffusers use either rubber membranes or ceramic elements typically and produce either fine or coarse bubbles.

== Types ==
Diffusers are generally referred to as either:

1. Fine Bubble/Fine Pore
2. Coarse Bubble

Other diffused aeration devices include: jet aerators, aspirators, and U tubes.

== Design specifications ==
Typical efficiency of a full floor coverage diffused aeration system in clean water is 2%/ft submergence or 6.6%/m submergence. When converted to mass transfer into process or dirty water, it is typically closer to about half of those figures. Manufacturers of fine bubble systems have supported claims that the type, number and size of "pores" have a great effect on efficiency of a diffused aeration system.

== Types of diffused aeration systems ==
Diffusers are typically connected to a piping system which is supplied with pressurized air by a blower. This system is commonly referred to as a diffused aeration system or aeration grid.

There are two main types of diffused aeration systems, retrievable and fixed grid, that are designed to serve different purposes. In the case of a plant with a single tank, a retrievable system is desirable, in order to avoid stopping operation of the plant when maintenance is required on the aeration system. Fixed systems, on the other hand, are typically less costly, and often more efficient because it is easier to make full use of the floor.

== See also ==
- List of waste-water treatment technologies
