= Aeration =

Process of circulating or mixing air with water

Aeration (also called aerification or aeriation) is the process by which air is circulated through, mixed with or dissolved in a liquid or other substances that act as a fluid (such as soil). Aeration processes create additional surface area in the mixture, allowing greater chemical or suspension reactions.

== Aeration of liquids ==
=== Methods ===
Aeration of liquids (usually water) is achieved by:

- passing air through the liquid by means of the Venturi tube, aeration turbines or compressed air which can be combined with diffuser(s) air stone(s), as well as fine bubble diffusers, coarse bubble diffusers or linear aeration tubing. Ceramics are suitable for this purpose, often involving dispersion of fine air or gas bubbles through the porous ceramic into a liquid. The smaller the bubbles, the more gas is exposed to the liquid increasing the gas transfer efficiency. Diffusers or spargers can also be designed into the system to cause turbulence or mixing if desired.

Porous ceramic diffusers are made by fusing aluminum oxide grains using porcelain bonds to form a strong, uniformly porous and homogeneous structure. The naturally hydrophilic material is easily wetted resulting in the production of fine, uniform bubbles.

On a given volume of air or liquid, the surface area changes proportionally with drop or bubble size, the very surface area where exchange can occur. Utilizing extremely small bubbles or drops increases the rate of gas transfer (aeration) due to the higher contact surface area. The pores which these bubbles pass through are generally micrometre-size.

=== Uses of aeration of liquids ===
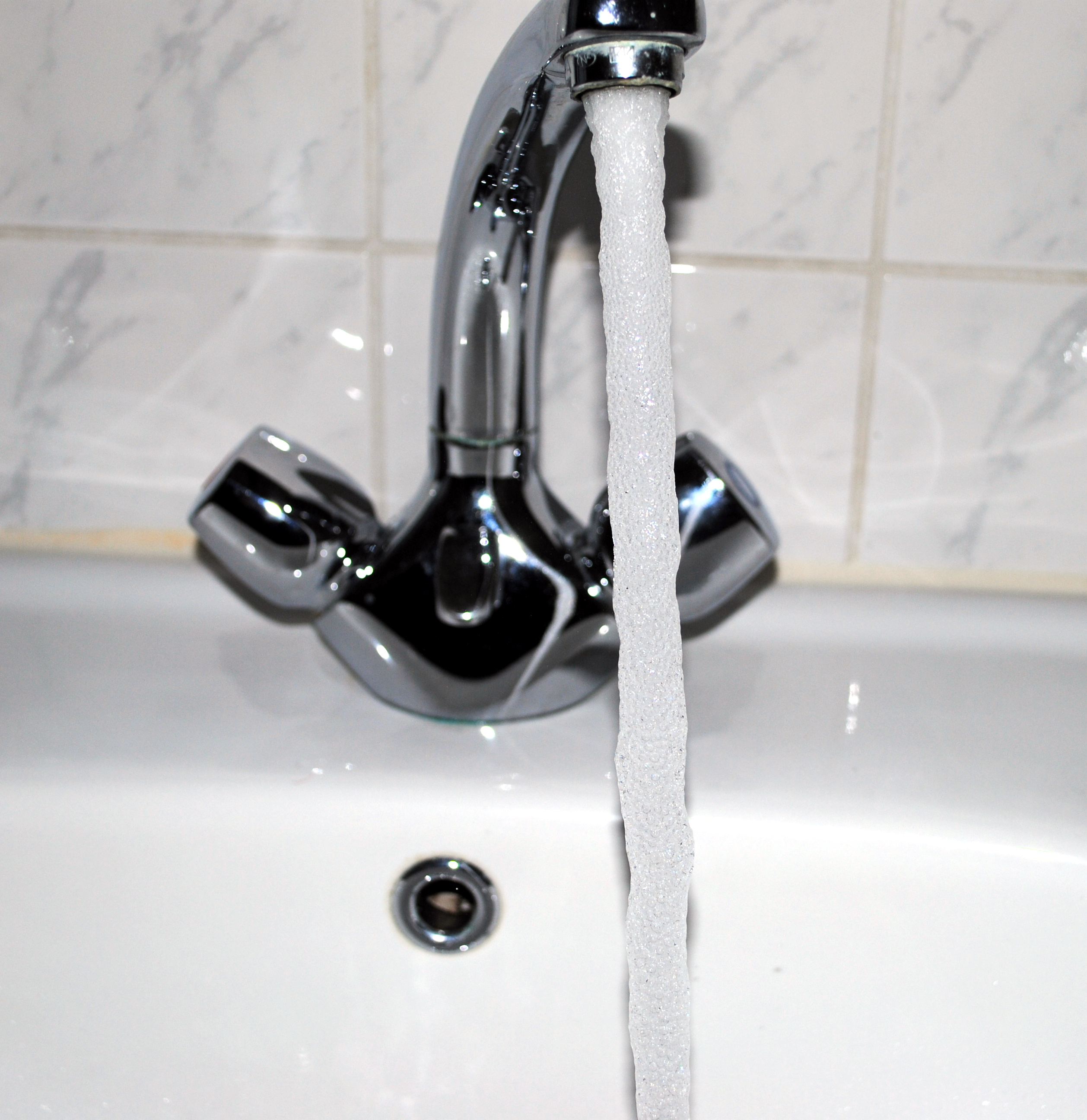
Aerated tap water

- To smooth (laminate) the flow of tap water at the faucet.
- Production of aerated water or cola for drinking purposes.
- Secondary treatment of sewage or industrial wastewater through use of aerating mixers/diffusers.
- To increase the oxygen content of water used to house animals, such as aquarium fish or fish farm
- To increase oxygen content of wort (unfermented beer) or must (unfermented wine) to allow yeast to propagate and begin fermentation.
- To dispel other dissolved gases such as carbon dioxide or chlorine.
- In chemistry, to oxidise a compound dissolved or suspended in water.
- To induce mixing of a body of otherwise still water.
- Pond aeration.

== Aeration in food ==
Aeration in food is a process by which air is absorbed into the food item. Such processes produce lightness in cakes and bread by creating larger and more numerous pores. Chemicals and foodstuffs added to enhance this effect can be known as leavening agents.

The color and texture of some sauces, pastes, and confections are also affected by air bubbles. One of the most frequent instances of such aeration in cooking is the whipping of egg white to produce foam. Egg whites and other substances added to enhance similar aeration—such as the soy protein or gelatine added to American nougat in candy bars—are known as whipping agents or aerating agents.

== Aeration in beverages ==
In wine tasting, a variety of methods are used to aerate the wine and bring out the aromas, including swirling wine in the glass, using a decanter to increase exposure to air, or using a specialized wine aerator. Cider from Asturias is poured into the glass from a height of about 1 metre (el escanciado) to increase aeration.

== See also ==
- Winkler test for dissolved oxygen
