= Water aeration =

Adding air to water

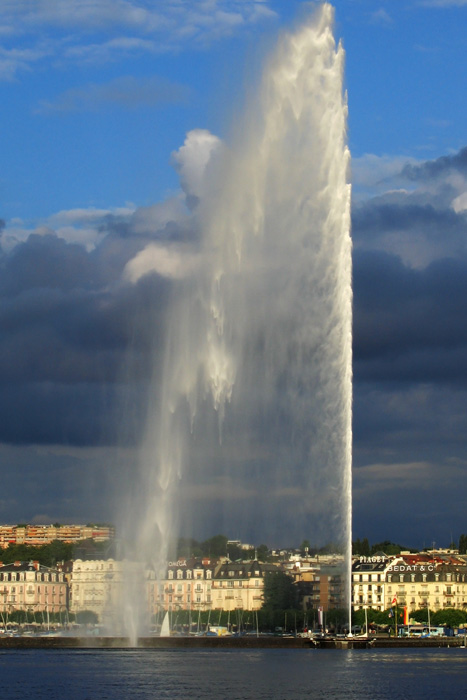
Fountains aerate water by spraying it into the air.

Water aeration is the process of increasing or maintaining the oxygen saturation of water in both natural and artificial environments. Aeration techniques are commonly used in pond, lake, and reservoir management to address low oxygen levels or algal blooms.

== Water quality ==
Water aeration is often required in water bodies that suffer from hypoxic or anoxic conditions, often caused by upstream human activities such as sewage discharges, agricultural run-off, or over-baiting a fishing lake. Aeration can be achieved through the infusion of air into the bottom of the lake, lagoon or pond or by surface agitation from a fountain or spray-like device to allow for oxygen exchange at the surface and the release of gasses such as carbon dioxide, methane or hydrogen sulfide.

Decreased levels of dissolved oxygen (DO) is a major contributor to poor water quality. Not only do fish and most other aquatic animals need oxygen, aerobic bacteria help decompose organic matter. When oxygen concentrations become low, anoxic conditions may develop which can decrease the ability of the water body to support life.

== Aeration methods ==
Any procedure by which oxygen is added to water can be considered a type of water aeration. There are many ways to aerate water, but these all fall into two broad areas – surface aeration and subsurface aeration. A variety of techniques and technologies are available for both approaches.

== Natural aeration ==
Natural aeration is a type of both sub-surface and surface aeration. It can occur through sub-surface aquatic plants. Through the natural process of photosynthesis, water plants release oxygen into the water providing it with the oxygen necessary for fish to live and aerobic bacteria to break down excess nutrients.

Oxygen can be driven into the water when the wind disturbs the surface of the water body and natural aeration can also occur through a movement of water caused by an incoming stream, waterfall, or even a strong flood.

In large water bodies in temperate climates, autumn turn-over can introduce oxygen rich water into the oxygen-poor hypolimnion.

== Surface aeration ==
=== Low speed surface aerator ===
A low speed surface aerator is a device for biology aeration with high efficiency. These devices are often in steel protected by epoxy coating and generate high torque. The mixing of water volume is excellent. The common power is between 1 and 250kW per unit with an efficiency (SOE) around 2 kgO2/kw. Low speed aerators are used mostly for biology plant aeration for water purification. The higher the diameter, the higher the SOE and mixing.

=== Fountains ===
A fountain is a means of spraying water upwards into the air. Typically this may be done using a motor that powers a rotating impeller. The impeller pumps water from the first few feet of the water and expels it into the air. This process uses air-water contact to transfer oxygen. As the water is propelled into the air, it breaks into small droplets. Collectively, these small droplets have a large surface area through which oxygen can be transferred. Upon return, these droplets mix with the rest of the water and thus transfer their oxygen back to the ecosystem.

Fountains are a popular method of providing surface aeration because of the aesthetic appearance that they offer. However, most fountains are unable to produce a large area of oxygenated water. Also, running electricity through the water to the fountain can be a safety hazard.

=== Floating surface aerators ===
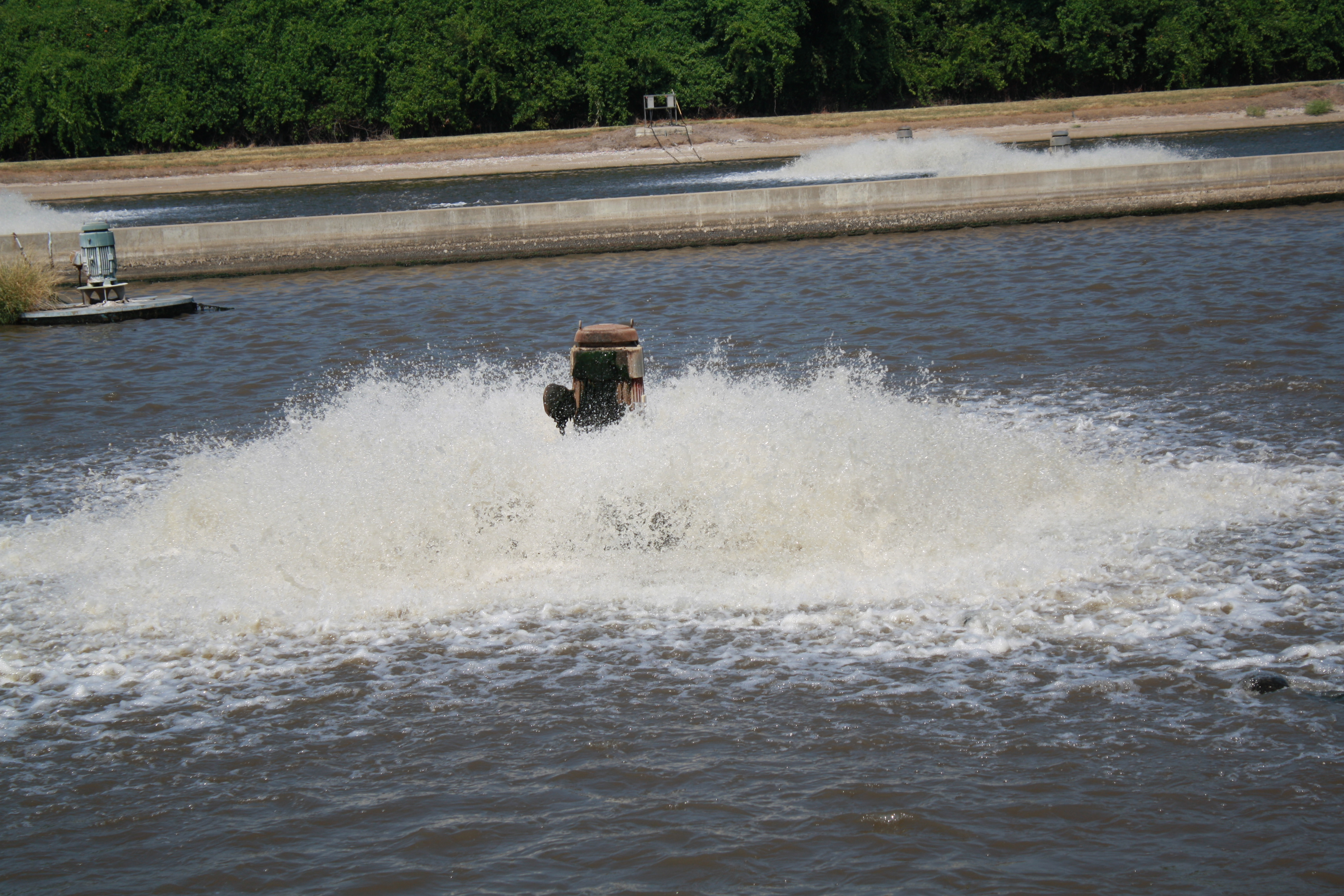
Typical mechanical surface aerator at work. It is often difficult for this type of machine to aerate the entire water column.

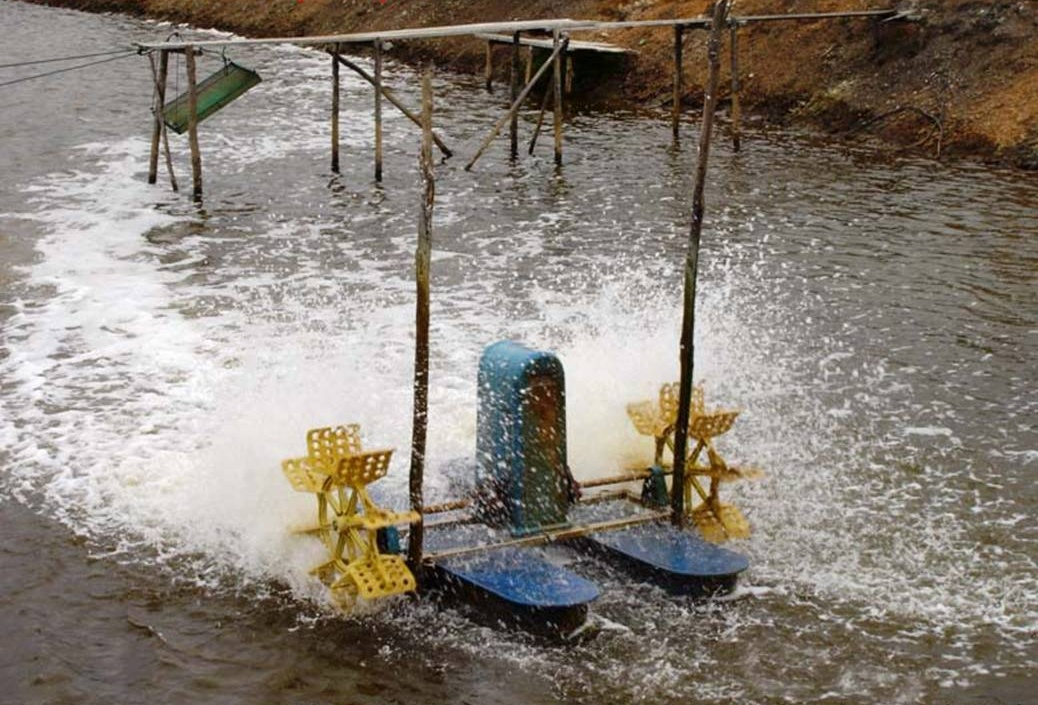
A one-horsepower paddlewheel aerator. The splashing may increase the evaporation rate of the water and thus increase the salinity of the water body.

Floating surface aerators work in a similar manner to fountains, but they do not offer the same aesthetic appearance. They extract water from the top 1–2 feet of the water body and utilize air-water contact to transfer oxygen. Instead of propelling water into the air, they disrupt the water at the water surface. Floating surface aerators are also powered by on-shore electricity. The effectiveness of a surface aerator is limited to a small area as they are unable to add circulation or oxygen to much more than a 3-metre radius. This circulation and oxygenating is then limited to the uppermost portion of the water column, often leaving the bottom portions unaffected. Low speed surface aerators can also be installed on floats.

=== Paddlewheel aerators ===
Paddlewheel aerators also utilize air-to-water contact to transfer oxygen from the air in the atmosphere to the water body. They are most often used in the aquaculture (rearing aquatic animals or cultivating aquatic plants for food) field. Constructed of a hub with attached paddles, these aerators are usually powered by a tractor power take-off (PTO), a gas engine, or an electric motor. They tend to be mounted on floats. Electricity forces the paddles to turn, churning the water and allowing oxygen transfer through air-water contact. As each new section of water is churned, it absorbs oxygen from the air and then, upon its return to the water, restores it to the water. In this regard paddlewheel aeration works very similarly to floating surface aerators.

== Subsurface aeration ==
Subsurface aeration releases bubbles at the bottom of the water body and allows them to rise by the force of buoyancy. Diffused aeration systems utilize bubbles to aerate as well as mix the water. Water displacement from the expulsion of bubbles causes a mixing action, and the contact between the water and the bubble will result in an oxygen transfer.

=== Jet aeration ===
Subsurface aeration uses jet aerators, which aspirate air, by means of the Venturi principle, and inject the air into the liquid.

=== Coarse bubble aeration ===
Coarse bubble aeration is a type of subsurface aeration where air is pumped from an on-shore air compressor. through a hose to a unit placed at the bottom of the water body. The unit expels coarse bubbles (more than 2mm in diameter), which release oxygen when they come into contact with the water, which also contributes to a mixing of the lake's stratified layers. With the release of large bubbles from the system, a turbulent displacement of water occurs which results in a mixing of the water. In comparison to other aeration techniques, coarse bubble aeration is very inefficient in the way of transferring oxygen. This is due to the large diameter and relatively small collective surface area of its bubbles.

=== Fine bubble aeration ===
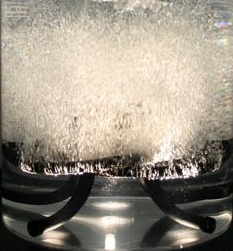
Fine bubble aeration is an efficient technique of aeration in terms of oxygen transfer due to the large collective surface area of its bubbles.

Fine bubble aeration is an efficient way to transfer oxygen to a water body. A compressor on shore pumps air through a hose, which is connected to an underwater aeration unit. Attached to the unit are a number of diffusers. These diffusers come in the shape of discs, plates, tubes or hoses constructed from glass-bonded silica, porous ceramic plastic, PVC or perforated membranes made from EPDM (ethylene propylene diene Monomer) rubber. Air pumped through the diffuser membranes is released into the water. These bubbles are known as fine bubbles. The EPA defines a fine bubble as anything smaller than 2mm in diameter. This type of aeration has a very high oxygen transfer efficiency (OTE), sometimes as high as 15 pounds of oxygen / (horsepower * hour) (9.1 kilograms of oxygen / (kilowatt * hour)). On average, diffused air aeration diffuses approximately 2–4 cfm (cubic feet of air per minute) (56.6-113.3 liters of air per minute), but some operate at levels as low as 1 cfm (28.3 L/min) or as high as 10 cfm (283 L/min).

Fine bubble diffused aeration maximizes the surface area of the bubbles, transferring more oxygen to the water per bubble volume. Smaller bubbles take more time to reach the surface so not only is the surface area maximized but so are the time each bubble spends in the water, allowing it more opportunity to transfer oxygen to the water. As a general rule, smaller bubbles and a deeper release point will generate a greater oxygen transfer rate.

The membranes of ceramic diffusers can sometimes clog and must be cleaned in order to keep them working at their optimum efficiency. They cannot mix the water column as well as other aeration techniques, such as coarse bubble aeration.

== Lake destratification ==
Circulators are commonly used to mix a pond or lake and thus reduce thermal stratification. Once circulated water reaches the surface, the air-water interface facilitates the transfer of oxygen to the lake water.

Natural resource and environmental managers have long been challenged by problems caused by thermal stratification of lakes. Fish die-offs have been directly associated with thermal gradients, stagnation, and ice cover. Excessive growth of plankton may limit the recreational use of lakes and the commercial use of lake water. With severe thermal stratification in a lake, the quality of drinking water also can be adversely affected. For fisheries managers, the spatial distribution of fish within a lake is often adversely affected by thermal stratification and in some cases may indirectly cause large die-offs of recreationally important fish.

One commonly used tool to reduce the severity of these lake management problems is to eliminate or lessen thermal stratification through aeration. Many types of aeration equipment have been used to reduce or eliminate thermal stratification. Aeration has met with some success, although it has rarely proved to be a panacea.

== Large-scale projects ==
=== Thames oxygenation barges ===
During heavy rain, London's sewage storm pipes overflow into the River Thames, sending dissolved oxygen levels plummeting and threatening the species it supports. Two dedicated McTay Marine vessels, oxygenation barges Thames Bubbler and Thames Vitality are used to replenish oxygen levels, as part of an ongoing battle to clean up the river, which now supports 115 species of fish and hundreds more invertebrates, plants and birds.

=== Cardiff Bay ===
The dissolved oxygen concentration within Cardiff Bay in Wales are maintained at or above 5 mg/L. Compressed air is pumped, from five sites around the Bay, through a series of steel reinforced rubber pipelines, laid on the beds of the Bay and Rivers Taff and Ely. These are connected to approximately 800 diffusers. At times this is insufficient and the Harbour Authority uses a mobile oxygenation barge built by McTay Marine with liquid oxygen stored in a tank. Liquid oxygen is passed through an electrically heated vapouriser and the gas is injected into a stream of water which is pumped from, and returned to, the bay. The barge is capable of dissolving up to 5 tonnes of oxygen in 24 hours.

=== Chesapeake Bay ===
Similar options have been proposed to help rehabilitate the Chesapeake Bay in the US where the principal problem is lack of filter-feeding organisms such as oysters responsible for keeping the water clean. Historically the Bay's oyster population was in the tens of billions, and they circulated the entire Bay volume in a matter of days. Due to pollution, disease and over-harvesting their population is a fraction of historic levels. Water that was once clear for meters is now so turbid and sediment-ridden that a wader may lose sight of their feet before their knees are wet. Oxygen is normally supplied by submerged aquatic vegetation via photosynthesis but pollution and sediments have reduced the plant populations, resulting in a reduction of dissolved oxygen levels, rendering areas of the bay unsuitable for aerobic aquatic life. In a symbiotic relation the plants provide the oxygen needed for underwater organisms to proliferate, and in exchange the filter feeders keep the water clean and thus clear enough for plants to have sufficient access to sunlight. Researchers have proposed oxygenation through artificial means as a solution to help improve water quality. Aeration of hypoxic water-bodies seems an appealing solution and it has been tried successfully many times on freshwater ponds and small lakes. However no one has undertaken an aeration project as large as an estuary.

A 353-hectare portion of the bay connected to the Rock Creek has been aerated using pipes since 2016. The system started as a large-bubble system intended mainly for de-stratification, creating a 74-ha oxic zone. It was upgraded in 2019 to fine-bubble injectors to provide more oxygen directly.

== Water treatment aeration ==
Many water treatment processes use a variety of forms of aeration to support biological oxidative processes. A typical example is activated sludge which can use fine or coarse bubble aeration or mechanical aeration cones which draw up mixed liquor from the base of a treatment tank and eject it through the air where oxygen is entrained in the liquor.

== See also ==
- Aerated lagoon
- Lake ecosystem
- Limnology
