= Jet aerators =

Wastewater treatment aeration devices

Jet aerators operating in a waste sludge tank at a paper mill.

Jet aerators are applied across a wide range of water, wastewater and biosolids treatment applications. Their primary purpose is to transfer oxygen to the liquid or sludge. A Jet aerator works through aspirating technology by simultaneously introducing large volumes of high kinetic energy liquid and air through one or more jet nozzles. The high velocity liquid exits the inner, primary jet and rapidly mixes with the incoming air in the outer jet. This intense mixing and high degree of turbulence in the gas/liquid cloud travels outward from the jet along the basin floor prior to the vertical rise of the gas bubble column to the liquid surface.

== Applications, features and benefits ==
=== Oxygen transfer efficiency and energy savings ===
In most industrial wastewater and biosolids applications jet aerators exhibit superior oxygen transfer efficiency compared to other aeration technologies. The hydrodynamic conditions within the jet and fine bubble cloud produces continuous surface renewal at the gas/liquid interface resulting in higher alpha factors. This results in superior process oxygen transfer performance in the presence of surfactants, extracellular enzymes and high MLS concentrations.

=== Process flexibility ===
Jet aerators do not require any external air source (i.e. compressor), except for the surrounding atmosphere. Jet aerators can be installed either as submersible units or piped through the tank wall using an external dry-installed chopper pump to feed the aspirating ejector(s). Jet aerators are easily configured into any basin geometry including circular, rectangular, looped reactors and sloped wall basins. Jet aerators are ideally suited for deep tank processes. The jet oxidation ditch is an example of technology innovation where the combination of a deeper basin design, bottom to top mixing and conservation of momentum combines to make a very efficient treatment process. In this and other applications the independent control of oxygen transfer and mixing is a valuable feature for both process control and energy savings.

=== Applications ===
- Equalization basins at sewage treatment plants
- Sewage wet wells and lift stations
- Aerobic digesters
- Leachate processing from landfills
- Waste processing at slaughterhouses, poultry abattoirs, fish processing plants, etc.
- Waste processing at tanneries (Article at Leather International)
- Pulp and paper - aeration of waste sludge
- As compresor-less aerator in electrochemical reactors to produce hydrogen peroxide
