= Wastewater treatment =

Converting wastewater into an effluent for return to the water cycle

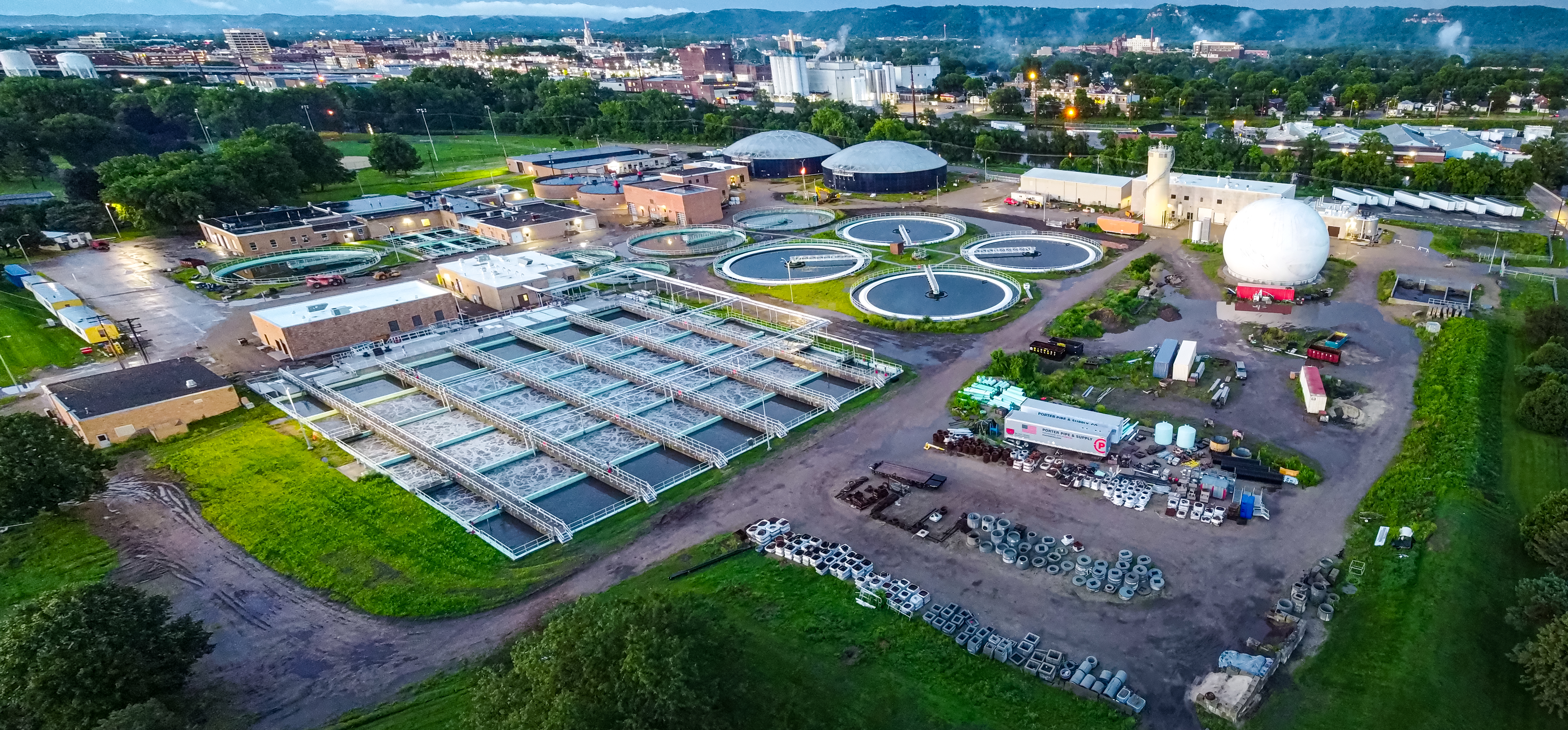
Sewage treatment plant (a type of wastewater treatment plant) in La Crosse, Wisconsin

Wastewater treatment is a process which removes contaminants from wastewater. The resulting effluent, discharged to a water body, has an acceptable impact on the environment. Domestic wastewater, also called municipal wastewater or sewage, is processed at a sewage treatment plant. Industrial wastewater is often processed at a specially-designed industrial wastewater treatment facility, or at a sewage treatment plant. In the latter case the industry typically performs on-site pretreatment of the waste, before it is sent to the municipal plant. Other types of wastewater treatment plants include agricultural wastewater treatment and leachate treatment plants.

The term "wastewater treatment" is often used to mean "sewage treatment".

Common processes in wastewater treatment include phase separation, such as sedimentation, various biological and chemical processes, such as oxidation, and polishing. The main by-product from wastewater treatment plants is a type of sludge that is usually treated in the same or another wastewater treatment plant. Biogas can be another by-product if the process uses anaerobic treatment.

Treated wastewater can be reused as reclaimed water. The main purpose of wastewater treatment is for the treated wastewater to be able to be disposed or reused safely. However, before it is treated, the options for disposal or reuse must be considered so the correct treatment process is used on the wastewater.

== Types of treatment plants ==
Wastewater treatment plants may be distinguished by the type of wastewater to be treated. There are numerous processes that can be used to treat wastewater depending on the type and extent of contamination. The treatment steps include physical, chemical and biological treatment processes.

Types of wastewater treatment plants include:

- Sewage treatment plants
- Industrial wastewater treatment plants
- Agricultural wastewater treatment plants
- Leachate treatment plants

=== Sewage treatment plants ===
Sewage treatment is a type of wastewater treatment which aims to remove contaminants from sewage to produce an effluent that is suitable for discharge to the surrounding environment or an intended reuse application, thereby preventing water pollution from raw sewage discharges. Sewage contains wastewater from households and businesses and possibly pre-treated industrial wastewater. There are a large number of sewage treatment processes to choose from. These can range from decentralized systems (including on-site treatment systems) to large centralized systems involving a network of pipes and pump stations (called sewerage) which convey the sewage to a treatment plant. For cities that have a combined sewer, the sewers will also carry urban runoff (stormwater) to the sewage treatment plant. Sewage treatment often involves two main stages, called primary and secondary treatment, while advanced treatment also incorporates a tertiary treatment stage with polishing processes and nutrient removal. Secondary treatment can reduce organic matter (measured as biological oxygen demand) from sewage, using aerobic or anaerobic biological processes. A quaternary treatment step (sometimes referred to as advanced treatment) can also be added for the removal of organic micropollutants, such as pharmaceuticals. This has been implemented in full-scale in Sweden.

A large number of sewage treatment technologies have been developed, mostly using biological treatment processes. Design engineers and decision makers need to take into account technical and economical criteria of each alternative when choosing a suitable technology. Often, the main criteria for selection are desired effluent quality, expected construction and operating costs, availability of land, energy requirements and sustainability aspects. In developing countries and in rural areas with low population densities, sewage is often treated by various on-site sanitation systems and not conveyed in sewers. These systems include septic tanks connected to drain fields, on-site sewage systems (OSS), and vermifilter systems. On the other hand, advanced and relatively expensive sewage treatment plants may include tertiary treatment with disinfection and possibly even a fourth treatment stage to remove micropollutants.

At the global level, an estimated 52% of sewage is treated. However, sewage treatment rates are highly unequal for different countries around the world. For example, while high-income countries treat approximately 74% of their sewage, developing countries treat an average of just 4.2%.

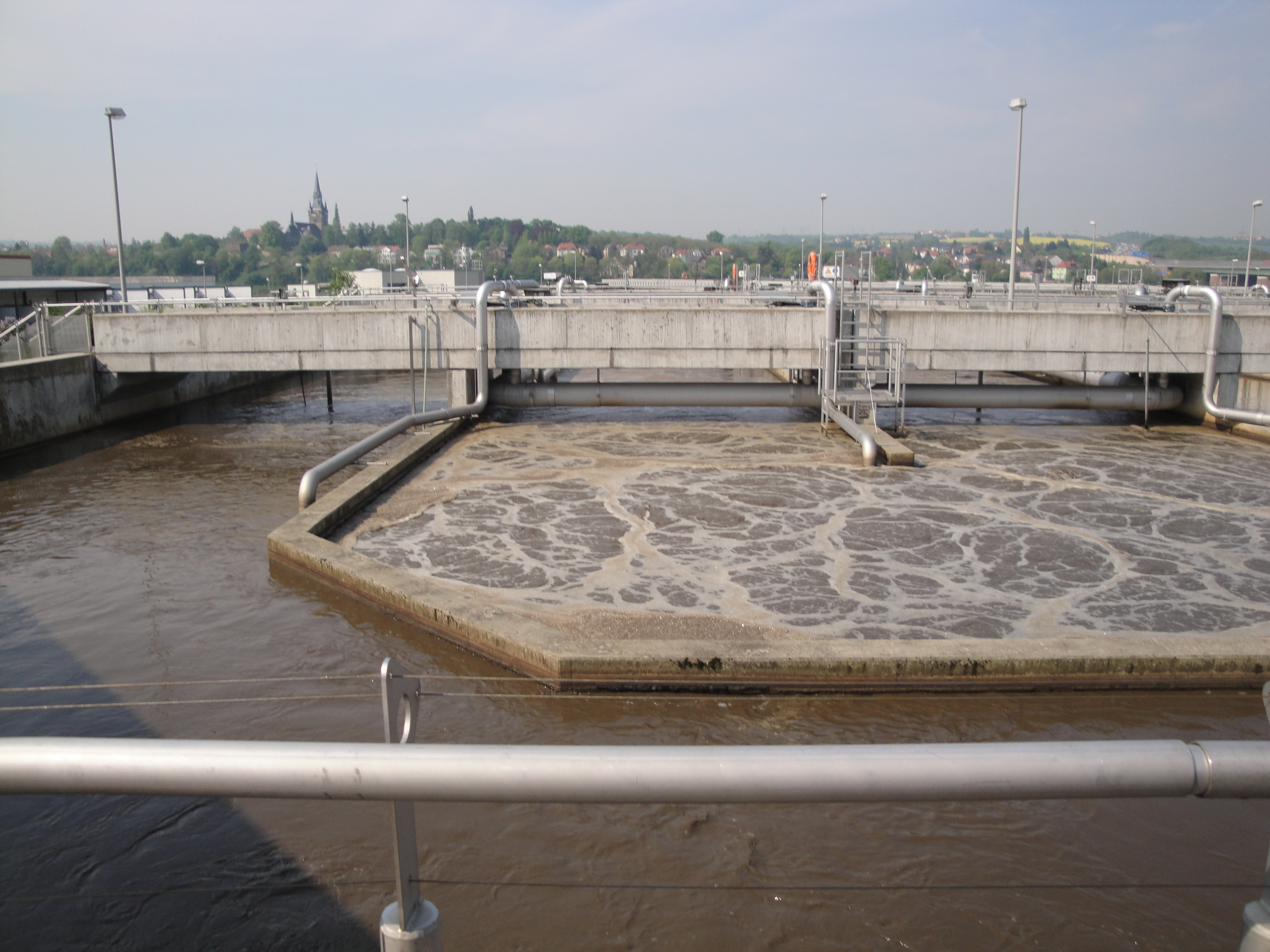
Aeration tank of an activated sludge process at the wastewater treatment plant in Dresden-Kaditz, Germany

=== Industrial wastewater treatment plants ===
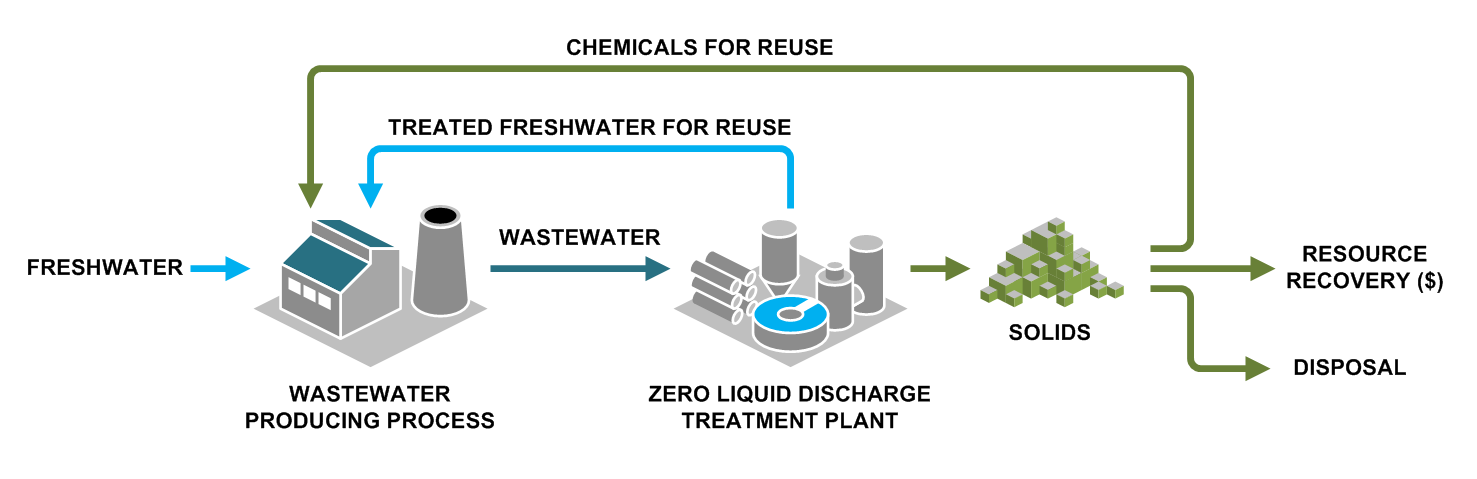
Wastewater from an industrial process can be converted at a treatment plant to solids and treated water for reuse.

Industrial wastewater treatment describes the processes used for treating wastewater that is produced by industries as an undesirable by-product. After treatment, the treated industrial wastewater (or effluent) may be reused or released to a sanitary sewer or to a surface water in the environment. Some industrial facilities generate wastewater that can be treated in sewage treatment plants. Most industrial processes, such as petroleum refineries, chemical and petrochemical plants have their own specialized facilities to treat their wastewaters so that the pollutant concentrations in the treated wastewater comply with the regulations regarding disposal of wastewaters into sewers or into rivers, lakes or oceans. This applies to industries that generate wastewater with high concentrations of organic matter (e.g. oil and grease), toxic pollutants (e.g. heavy metals, volatile organic compounds) or nutrients such as ammonia. Some industries install a pre-treatment system to remove some pollutants (e.g., toxic compounds), and then discharge the partially treated wastewater to the municipal sewer system.

Most industries produce some wastewater. Recent trends have been to minimize such production or to recycle treated wastewater within the production process. Some industries have been successful at redesigning their manufacturing processes to reduce or eliminate pollutants. Sources of industrial wastewater include battery manufacturing, chemical manufacturing, electric power plants, food industry, iron and steel industry, metal working, mines and quarries, nuclear industry, oil and gas extraction, petroleum refining and petrochemicals, pharmaceutical manufacturing, pulp and paper industry, smelters, textile mills, industrial oil contamination, water treatment and wood preserving. Treatment processes include brine treatment, solids removal (e.g. chemical precipitation, filtration), oils and grease removal, removal of biodegradable organics, removal of other organics, removal of acids and alkalis, and removal of toxic materials.

=== Agricultural wastewater treatment plants ===
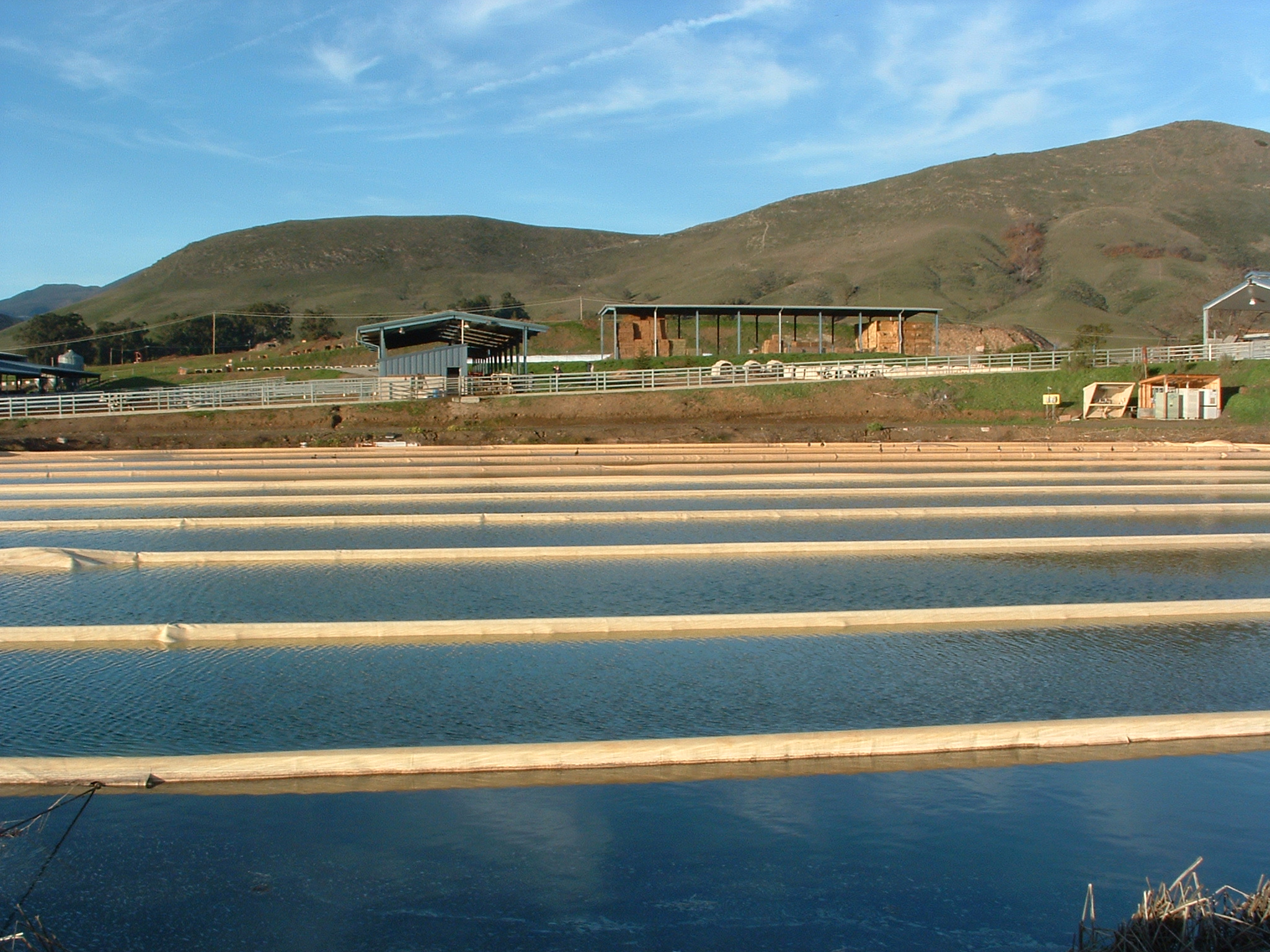
Anaerobic lagoon for treatment of dairy wastes

Agricultural wastewater treatment is a farm management agenda for controlling pollution from confined animal operations and from surface runoff that may be contaminated by chemicals or organisms in fertilizer, pesticides, animal slurry, crop residues or irrigation water. Agricultural wastewater treatment is required for continuous confined animal operations like milk and egg production. It may be performed in plants using mechanized treatment units similar to those used for industrial wastewater. Where land is available for ponds, settling basins and facultative lagoons may have lower operational costs for seasonal use conditions from breeding or harvest cycles. Animal slurries are usually treated by containment in anaerobic lagoons before disposal by spray or trickle application to grassland. Constructed wetlands are sometimes used to facilitate treatment of animal wastes.

Nonpoint source pollution includes sediment runoff, nutrient runoff and pesticides. Point source pollution includes animal wastes, silage liquor, milking parlour (dairy farming) wastes, slaughtering waste, vegetable washing water and firewater. Many farms generate nonpoint source pollution from surface runoff which is not controlled through a treatment plant.

=== Leachate treatment plants ===
Leachate treatment plants are used to treat leachate from landfills. Treatment options include: biological treatment, mechanical treatment by ultrafiltration, treatment with active carbon filters, electrochemical treatment including electrocoagulation by various proprietary technologies and reverse osmosis membrane filtration using disc tube module technology.

== Unit processes ==
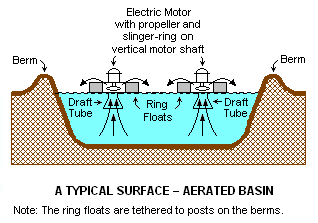
Diagram of a typical surface-aerated basin for wastewater treatment

The unit processes involved in wastewater treatment include physical processes such as settlement or flotation and biological processes such as oxidation or anaerobic treatment. Some wastewaters require specialized treatment methods. At the simplest level, treatment of most wastewaters is carried out through separation of solids from liquids, usually by sedimentation. By progressively converting dissolved material into solids, usually a biological floc or biofilm, which is then settled out or separated, an effluent stream of increasing purity is produced.

=== Phase separation ===
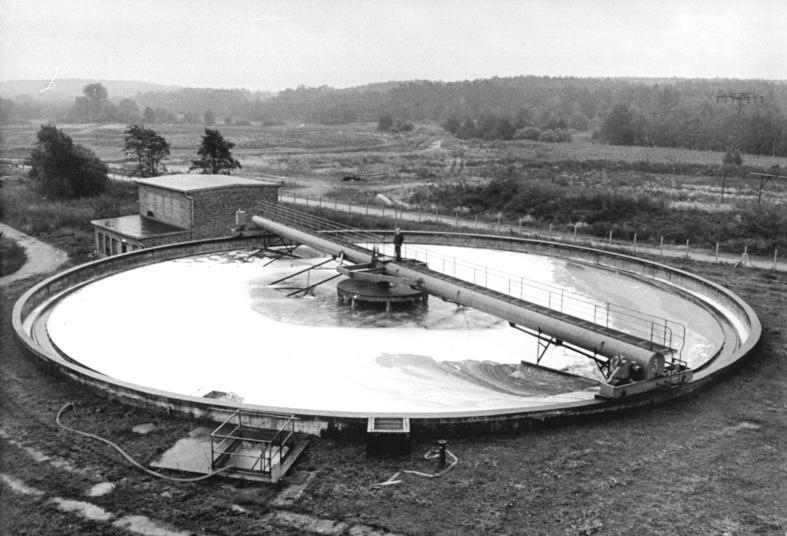
Clarifiers are widely used for wastewater treatment.

Phase separation transfers impurities into a non-aqueous phase. Phase separation may occur at intermediate points in a treatment sequence to remove solids generated during oxidation or polishing. Grease and oil may be recovered for fuel or saponification. Solids often require dewatering of sludge in a wastewater treatment plant. Disposal options for dried solids vary with the type and concentration of impurities removed from water.

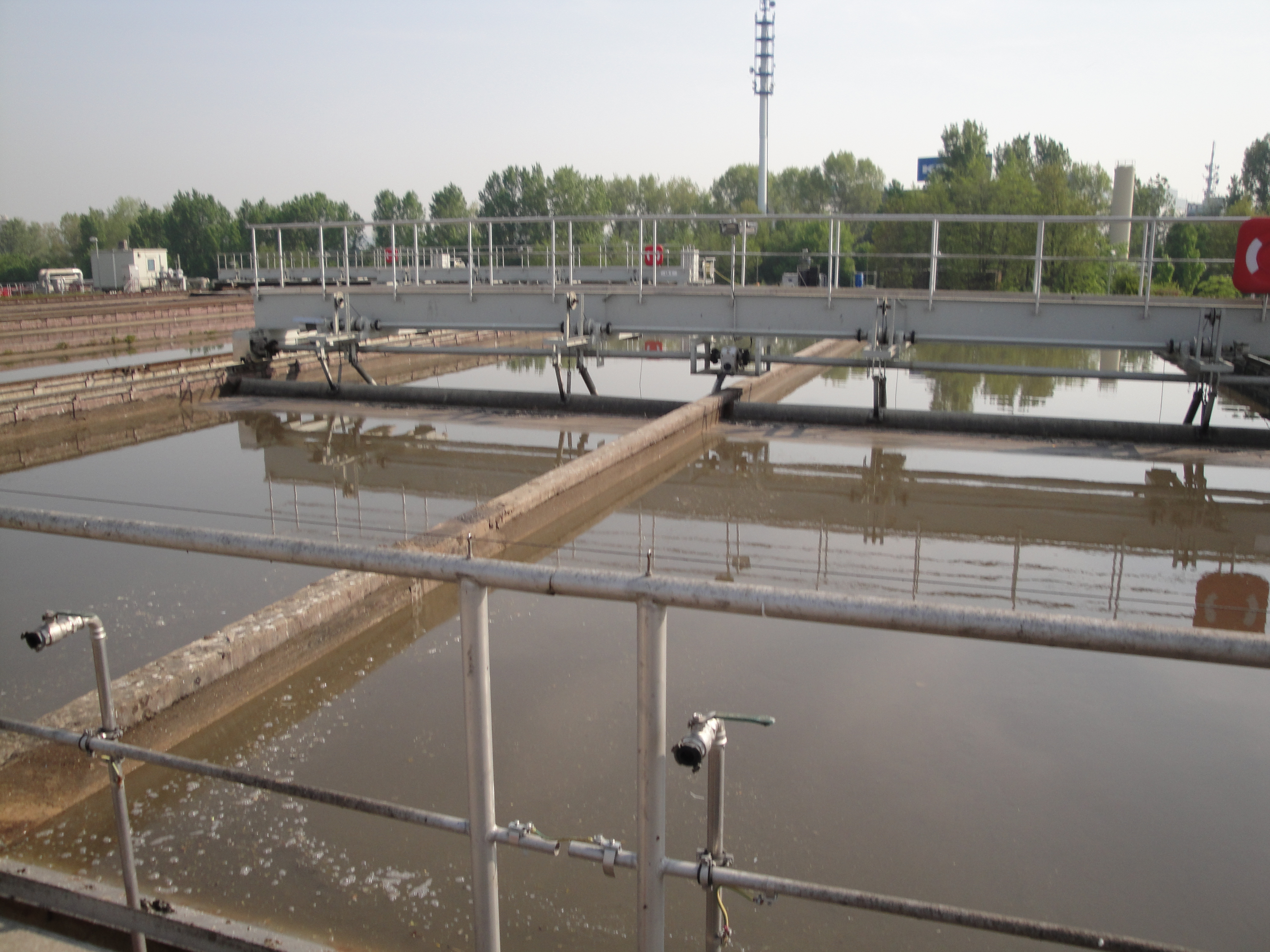
Primary settling tank of wastewater treatment plant in Dresden-Kaditz, Germany

==== Sedimentation ====
Solids such as stones, grit, and sand may be removed from wastewater by gravity when density differences are sufficient to overcome dispersion by turbulence. This is typically achieved using a grit channel designed to produce an optimum flow rate that allows grit to settle and other less-dense solids to be carried forward to the next treatment stage. Gravity separation of solids is the primary treatment of sewage, where the unit process is called "primary settling tanks" or "primary sedimentation tanks". It is also widely used for the treatment of other types of wastewater. Solids that are denser than water will accumulate at the bottom of quiescent settling basins. More complex clarifiers also have skimmers to simultaneously remove floating grease such as soap scum and solids such as feathers, wood chips, or condoms. Containers like the API oil-water separator are specifically designed to separate non-polar liquids.

=== Biological and chemical processes ===
==== Oxidation ====
Oxidation lowers the biochemical oxygen demand of wastewater, and may detoxify some impurities. Secondary treatment converts organic compounds into carbon dioxide, water, and biosolids through oxidation and reduction reactions. Chemical oxidation is widely used for disinfection.

===== Biochemical oxidation (secondary treatment) =====
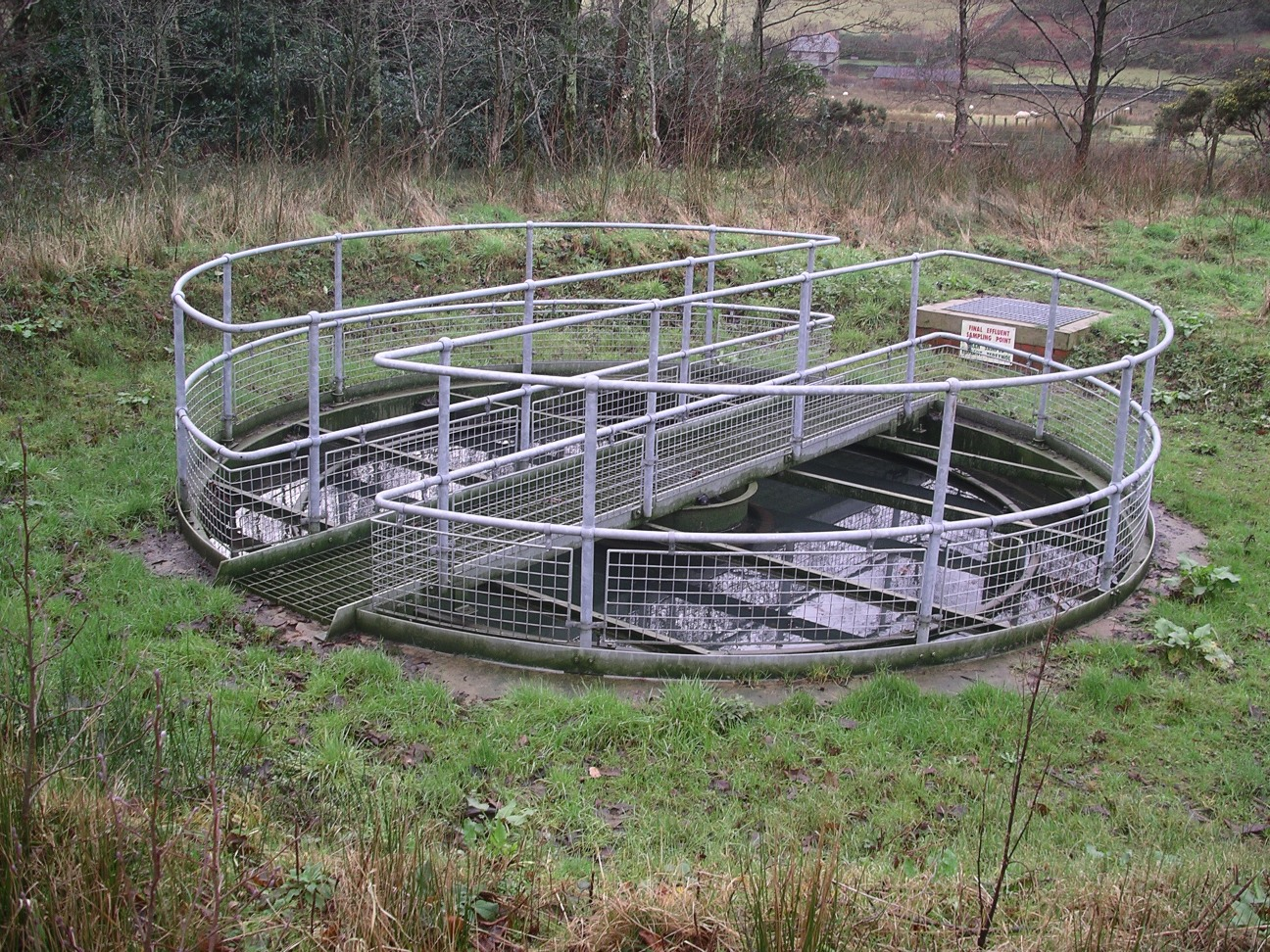
This small secondary clarifier at a rural sewage treatment plant is a typical phase separation mechanism to remove biological solids formed in a suspended growth or fixed-film bioreactor.

Secondary treatment (mostly biological wastewater treatment) is the removal of biodegradable organic matter (in solution or suspension) from sewage or similar kinds of wastewater. The aim is to achieve a certain degree of effluent quality in a sewage treatment plant suitable for the intended disposal or reuse option. A "primary treatment" step often precedes secondary treatment, whereby physical phase separation is used to remove settleable solids. During secondary treatment, biological processes are used to remove dissolved and suspended organic matter measured as biochemical oxygen demand (BOD). These processes are performed by microorganisms in a managed aerobic or anaerobic process depending on the treatment technology. Bacteria and protozoa consume biodegradable soluble organic contaminants (e.g. sugars, fats, and organic short-chain carbon molecules from human waste, food waste, soaps and detergent) while reproducing to form cells of biological solids. Secondary treatment is widely used in sewage treatment and is also applicable to many agricultural and industrial wastewaters.

===== Chemical oxidation =====
Advanced oxidation processes are used to remove some persistent organic pollutants and concentrations remaining after biochemical oxidation. Disinfection by chemical oxidation kills bacteria and microbial pathogens by adding hydroxyl radicals such as ozone, chlorine or hypochlorite to wastewater. These hydroxyl radicals then break down complex compounds in the organic pollutants into simple compounds such as water, carbon dioxide, and salts.

==== Anaerobic treatment ====
Anaerobic wastewater treatment processes are also widely applied in the treatment of industrial wastewaters and biological sludge. Anaerobic treatment occurs in a rectangular or cylindrical reactor, containing a porous packing medium lined with biofilm or biomass, that filters the solids out of the wastewater that enters it. The biomass interacts with the wastewater's organic compounds and turns them into methane and then into carbon dioxide. Upflow anaerobic sludge blanket digestion (UASB) submerges the packing medium, whereas downflow digestion may or may not. There is a variant of the UASB process called expanded granular sludge bed digestion (EGSB) that moves the wastewater faster through the reactor. Anaerobic processes produce biogas from 70-90%, and microbial biomass from 5-15%, of the wastewater's organic matter; the remainder does not decompose. Anaerobic processes are cheaper to set up; require less energy, nutrients and land; create methane gas; and produce only a fifth to a third of the solid byproducts that aerobic processes do. Anaerobic processes, however, do not do well at removing pathogens, nitrogen and phosphorus. They also produce foul odours, require post-treatment and can be slow to start up. Many compounds, like ammonia and sulfide, can disrupt anaerobic processes.

=== Polishing ===
Polishing refers to treatments made in further advanced treatment steps after the above methods (also called "fourth stage" treatment). These treatments may also be used independently for some industrial wastewater. Chemical reduction or pH adjustment minimizes chemical reactivity of wastewater following chemical oxidation. Carbon filtering removes remaining contaminants and impurities by chemical adsorption onto activated carbon. Filtration through sand (calcium carbonate) or fabric filters is the most common method used in municipal wastewater treatment.

== See also ==
- List of largest wastewater treatment plants
- List of wastewater treatment technologies
- Water treatment

== Works cited ==
- Chernicharo, Carlos Augusto de Lemos (2007). Anaerobic Reactors. Biological Wastewater Treatment Ser. London: IWA Publishing. ISBN 978-1-84339-164-7.
