= Sedimentation =

Tendency for particles in suspension to settle down

Sedimentation is the deposition of sediments. It takes place when particles in suspension settle out of the fluid in which they are entrained and come to rest against a barrier. This is due to their motion through the fluid in response to the forces acting on them: these forces can be due to gravity, centrifugal acceleration, or electromagnetism. Settling is the falling of suspended particles through the liquid, whereas sedimentation is the final result of the settling process.

In geology, sedimentation is the deposition of sediments which results in the formation of sedimentary rock. The term is broadly applied to the entire range of processes that result in the formation of sedimentary rock, from initial erosion through sediment transport and settling to the lithification of the sediments. However, the strict geological definition of sedimentation is the mechanical deposition of sediment particles from an initial suspension in air or water.

Sedimentation may pertain to objects of various sizes, ranging from large rocks in flowing water, to suspensions of dust and pollen particles, to cellular suspensions, to solutions of single molecules such as proteins and peptides. Even small molecules supply a sufficiently strong force to produce significant sedimentation.

== Principles ==
=== Settling ===
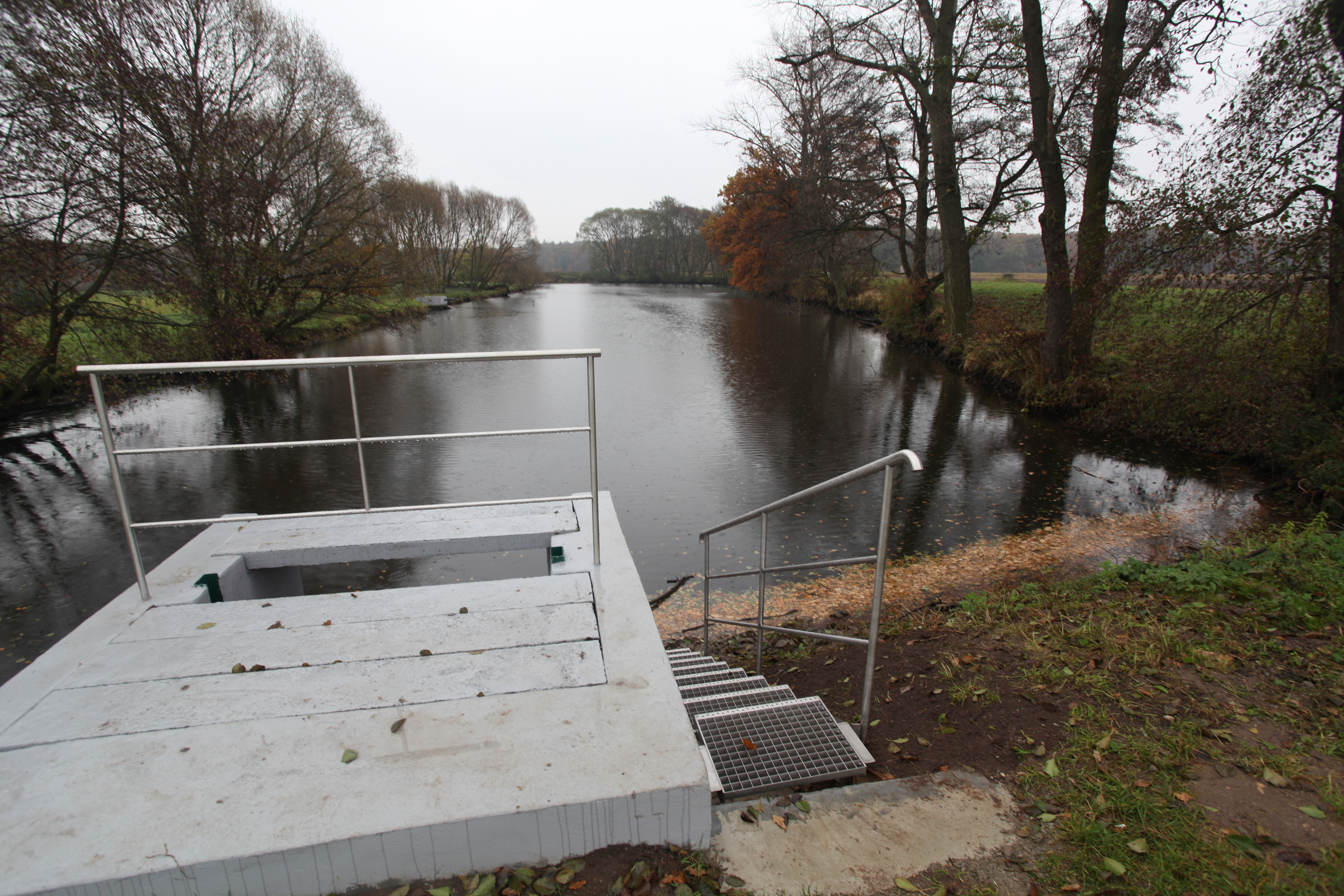
Settling pond for iron particles at water works

Settling is the process by which particulates move towards the bottom of a liquid and form a sediment. Particles that experience a force, either due to gravity or due to centrifugal motion will tend to move in a uniform manner in the direction exerted by that force. For gravity settling, this means that the particles will tend to fall to the bottom of the vessel, forming sludge or slurry at the vessel base. Settling is an important operation in many applications, such as mining, wastewater and drinking water treatment, biological science, space propellant reignition, and scooping.

=== Classification ===
Classification of sedimentation:

- Type 1 sedimentation is characterized by particles that settle discretely at a constant settling velocity, or by the deposition of Iron-Rich minerals to streamlines down to the point source. They settle as individual particles and do not flocculate (stick to each other) during settling. Example: sand and grit material
- Type 2 sedimentation is characterized by particles that flocculate during sedimentation and because of this their size is constantly changing and therefore their settling velocity is changing. Example: alum or iron coagulation
- Type 3 sedimentation is also known as zone sedimentation. In this process the particles are at a high concentration (greater than 1000 mg/L) such that the particles tend to settle as a mass and a distinct clear zone and sludge zone are present. Zone settling occurs in lime-softening, sedimentation, active sludge sedimentation and sludge thickeners.

=== Sedimentation equilibrium ===
When particles settling from a suspension reach a hard boundary, the concentration of particles at the boundary is opposed by the diffusion of the particles. The distribution of sediment near the boundary comes into sedimentation equilibrium. Measurements of the distribution yields information on the nature of the particles.

== In geology ==
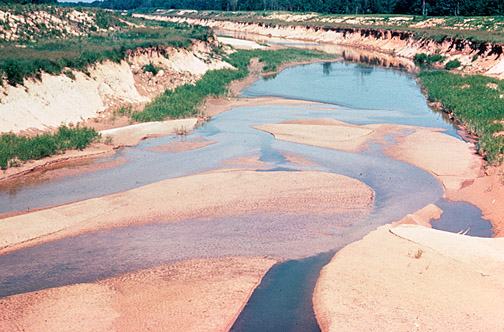
Siltation

In geology, the term sedimentation is broadly applied to the entire range of processes that result in the formation of sedimentary rock, from initial formation of sediments by erosion of particles from rock outcrops, through sediment transport and settling, to the lithification of the sediments. However, the term is more particularly applied to the deposition of sediments, and in the strictest sense, it applies only to the mechanical deposition of sediment particles from an initial suspension in air or water. Sedimentation results in the formation of depositional landforms and the rocks that constitute the sedimentary record. The building up of land surfaces by sedimentation, particularly in river valleys, is called aggradation.

The rate of sedimentation is the thickness of sediment accumulated per unit time. For suspended load, this can be expressed mathematically by the Exner equation. Rates of sedimentation vary from less than 3 millimeters (0.12 in) per thousand years for pelagic sediment to several meters per thousand years in portions of major river deltas. However, long-term accumulation of sediments is determined less by rate of sedimentation than by rate of subsidence, which creates accommodation space for sediments to accumulate over geological time scales.

Most sedimentation in the geologic record occurred in relative brief depositional episodes separated by long intervals of nondeposition or even erosion.

In estuarine environments, settling can be influenced by the presence or absence of vegetation. Trees such as mangroves are crucial to the attenuation of waves or currents, promoting the settlement of suspended particles.

=== Siltation ===
An undesired increased transport and sedimentation of suspended material is called siltation, and it is a major source of pollution in waterways in some parts of the world. High sedimentation rates can be a result of poor land management and a high frequency of flooding events. If not managed properly, it can be detrimental to fragile ecosystems on the receiving end, such as coral reefs. Climate change also affects siltation rates.

=== Human-enhanced sedimentation ===
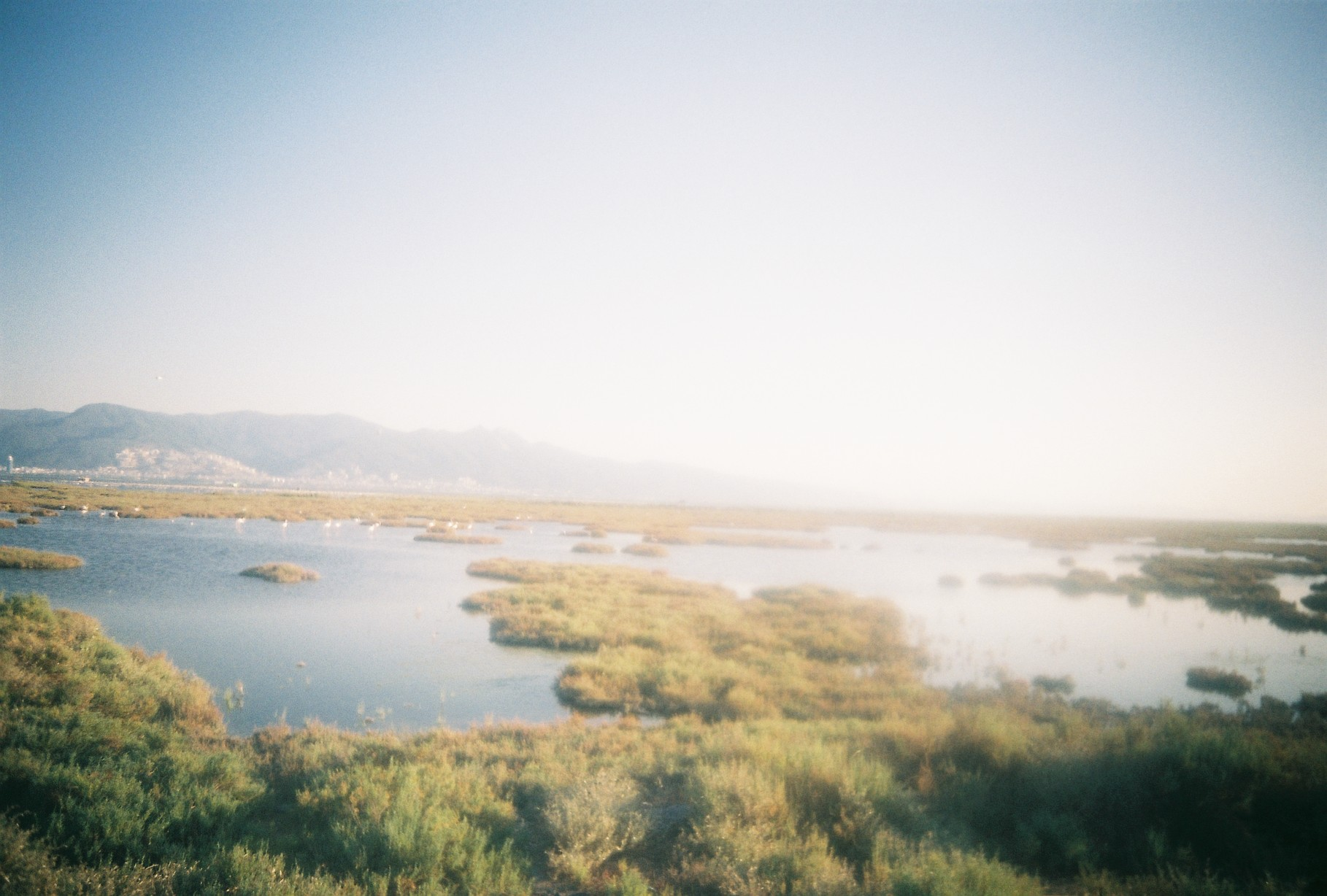
Gediz delta, showing a typical natural delta landscape

Sedimentation enhancing strategies are environmental management projects aiming to restore and facilitate land-building processes in deltas. Sediment availability and deposition are important because deltas naturally subside and therefore need sediment accumulation to maintain their elevation, particularly considering increasing rates of sea-level rise. Sedimentation enhancing strategies aim to increase sedimentation on the delta plain primarily by restoring the exchange of water and sediments between rivers and low-lying delta plains. Sedimentation enhancing strategies can be applied to encourage land elevation gain to offset sea-level rise. Interest in sedimentation enhancing strategies has recently increased due to their ability to raise land elevation, which is important for the long-term sustainability of deltas.

== In chemistry ==
In chemistry, sedimentation has been used to measure the size of large molecules (macromolecule), where the force of gravity is augmented with centrifugal force in an ultracentrifuge.

== In water treatment ==
The physical process of sedimentation (the act of depositing sediment) has applications in water treatment, whereby gravity acts to remove suspended solids from water. Solid particles entrained by the turbulence of moving water may be removed naturally by sedimentation in the still water of lakes and oceans. Settling basins are ponds constructed for the purpose of removing entrained solids by sedimentation. Clarifiers are tanks built with mechanical means for continuous removal of solids being deposited by sedimentation; however, clarification does not remove dissolved solids.

== See also ==
- Coagulation (disambiguation)
