= In situ capping of subaqueous waste =

In-Situ Capping (ISC) of Subaqueous Waste is a non-removal remediation technique for contaminated sediment that involves leaving the waste in place and isolating it from the environment by placing a layer of soil and/or material over the contaminated waste as to prevent further spread of the contaminant. In-situ capping provides a viable way to remediate an area that is contaminated. It is an option when pump and treat becomes too expensive and the area surrounding the site is a low energy system. The design of the cap and the characterization of the surrounding areas are of equal importance and drive the feasibility of the entire project. Numerous successful cases exist and more will exist in the future as the technology expands and grows more popular. In-situ capping uses techniques developed in chemistry, biology, geotechnical engineering, environmental engineering, and environmental geotechnical engineering.

== Introduction ==
Contaminants located in sediments still pose a risk to the environment and human health. Some of the direct effects on aquatic life that can be associated with contaminated sediment include “the development of cancerous tumors in fish exposed to polycyclic aromatic hydrocarbons in sediments." These high-risk sediments need to be remediated. There are usually only four options for remediation:

1. Nonremoval technologies
  1. Containment in-place (In-Situ Capping)
  2. Treatment in-place
2. Removal technologies
  1. Removal and containment
  2. Removal and treatment

The cap can be made up of many different things, including but not limited to sand, gravel, geotextiles, and multiple layers of these options.

There are many ways that a contaminant inside sediment can become introduced to the environment. These ways include but are not limited to advection, diffusion, benthic organisms mixing and reworking of the upper layer of the contaminated sediment, and sediment re-suspension by different subaquatic forces. In-situ capping (ISC) can fix all of these adverse effects with three primary functions:

1. Isolation of the contaminated sediment from the benthic environment; this prevents the contaminant from spreading up the food chain. This isolation of the contaminant is the most important factor in reducing exposure risks.
2. Prevention of resuspension and transport of the contaminant, referred to as stabilization of the sediments.
3. Reduction of the flux of dissolved contaminants into the water column, also known as chemical isolation.

A fourth, although not necessary, function of an in-situ cap should be the "encouragement of habitat values." This should not be made a primary goal except in extreme circumstances. This can be achieved by altering the superficial characteristics of the cap to "encourage desirable species or discourage undesirable species."

The obvious advantage of using in-situ capping is that the waste will not be disturbed, and it prevents further contamination of the surrounding area from movement of the contaminant by removal. Sadly, the long-term effects of ISC have not been studied since it is an emerging technology.

In-situ capping has been effective in numerous locations. For example, in several places in the interior of Japan “in-situ capping of nutrient-laden sediments with sand” has worked very well in preserving water quality by reducing “the release of nutrients (nitrogen and phosphorus)” and oxygen depletion by bottom sediments.

== Site evaluation ==
=== Remedial objectives ===
It is very important to evaluate the site and goals of a specific project to determine if ISC is the right technique to use. First, it is important to find out if ISC will satisfy all of the desired remedial objectives. To determine if ISC will satisfy the remedial objectives it is important to look at the three primary functions previously listed for ISC. For the first function it is important to realize that “the ability of an ISC to isolate aquatic organisms from the sediment contaminants is dependent upon” the deposition of new sediment contaminants being deposited on the cap. If contaminated sediment is deposited back on top of the cap then a cap was built to separate the contaminated layers. Thus, “ISC should only be considered if source control has been implemented." Stabilization of the contaminated sediment could be a design function if the goal of remediation is to prevent negative environmental impacts due to “resuspension, transport and redeposition” of the contaminated sediments to other remote areas. Furthermore, if a remedial objective is desired, then the purpose of the ISC could be to isolate the contaminated soil from the surrounding environment, thus controlling the environment of the contaminated soil and causing possible degradation of the contaminate.

=== Criteria ===
On site evaluation to see if ISC is a good remediation technique is based on several criteria: the surrounding physical environment, current and long-term hydrodynamic conditions, the geotechnical and geological conditions, hydrogeological conditions, on-site sediment characterization, and current and long-term waterway uses.

Many of the physical properties of the surrounding area where the cap would be placed are important. Some things to consider when constructing a cap would be “waterway dimensions, water depths, tidal patterns, ice formations, aquatic vegetation, bridge crossings and proximity of lands or marine structures”. It is best if the area surrounding the ISC is flat for ease of installation.

=== Hydrodynamic conditions ===
The hydrodynamic conditions are of equal importance. It is best if in-situ capping projects are performed in low-energy waterways such as harbors, low flow streams, or estuaries. High energy and high flow environments can affect the long-term stability of the cap and cause plausible erosion over time. Currents are also important. Currents vary along a water column and placement of the ISC can be negatively affected by changing currents. It is important to take into consideration the long-term impacts of episodic events such as tidal flow on bottom current velocities. Modeling must be done to determine if placement of the in-situ cap will alter existing hydrodynamic conditions.

=== Geotechnical and geological conditions ===
A study of the geotechnical and geological conditions must be made before the placement of the in-situ cap because of potential settling underneath the cap. If settling is predicted to be significant, the cap design may have to be designed thicker than originally projected to allow the settling to not alter the integrity of the cap.

Hydrogeological conditions are important to consider before placement. It is important to locate areas of discharge, which are areas where the groundwater flow path has an upward component. This discharge can cause the in-situ cap to become displaced or cause containments to be transported to the surface water, thus causing decreased effectiveness of the in-situ cap.

=== Sediment characterization ===
Typical sediment characterization is needed before construction and design of the ISC can be implemented. These tests on the sediments include: “visual classification, natural water content/solids concentrations, plasticity indices (Atterberg limits), total organic carbon (TOC) content, grain size distribution, specific gravity, and Unified Soil Classification System (USCS)”.

=== Waterway uses ===
It is important to realize what the current waterway uses are and how they may be affected with the placement of an in-situ cap. Some waterway uses that may be affected by the construction of an in-situ cap include but are not limited to “navigation, flood control, recreation, water supply, storm water or effluent discharge, waterfront development, and utility crossing." Since the construction of an in-situ cap may limit some of these activities due to the importance that the caps integrity be maintained over an extended period of time, any use that may cause displacement of the cap should be limited. Furthermore, the construction of an in-situ cap will cause a drop in water depth thus limiting the size of ships that may cross the area. These limitations on the waterway may also have social and economic impacts that must be considered.

=== Regulatory standards ===
It is important to know all of the regulatory standards in place for the desired location of the ISC. All ISC must comply with the requirements in the Resource Conservation and Recovery Act (RCRA) and the Toxic Substances Control Act (TSCA), although the ability of in-situ capping to meet those standards in the long term has not been successfully researched and studied enough due to lack of data.

== Cap design ==
Cap design, which includes the composition and dimensions of the components, is probably the most important aspect of in-situ capping. The cap designs “must be compatible with available construction and placement techniques” along with meeting the three previously mentioned criteria above. The cap designs usually are over small areas with small volumes of contaminants. The cap is usually constructed with many layers of granular media, armor stone, and geotextiles. Presently, laboratory tests and models of the various processes involved (advection, diffusion, bioturbation, consolidation, erosion), limited field experience, and monitoring data drive cap design. Since data and field experience is limited a conservative approach is used when designing an in-situ cap. This approach uses the idea that the many different components are additive and no cap component provides a dual function, although a component may provide a dual function in actual practice.

=== The six steps of cap design ===
The six general steps for in-situ cap design, provided by Palermo et al. are listed below:

1. Identify candidate capping materials and compatibility with contaminated sediment at the site.
2. Assess the bioturbation potential of indigenous benthos and design a cap component to physically isolate sediment contaminants from the benthic environment.
3. Evaluate potential erosion at the capping site due to currents, waves, propeller wash, and design a cap component to stabilize the contaminated sediments and other cap components.
4. Evaluate the potential flux of sediment contaminants and design a cap component to reduce the flux of dissolved contaminants into the water column.
5. Evaluate potential interactions and compatibility among cap components, including consolidation of compressible materials.
6. Evaluate operational considerations and determine restrictions or additional protective measure needed to assure cap integrity.

=== Selection of materials ===
Identifying the materials should be assessed at the beginning of the project because they typically represent the largest cost to the project. Thus, if the materials needed cost too much the project may not be feasible at all. Granular materials are used in most cases. These can include but are not limited to “quarry sand, naturally occurring sediments or soil materials”. Studies have shown that fine-grained materials and sandy materials can be effective in the construction of an in-situ cap. Furthermore, fine grain materials have been shown to act as better chemical barriers than sand caps. Thus a fine grain material is a better capping component than factory-washed sand. It is important to have control the amount of organic material within the cap because the benthic organisms have shown interest in burrowing within any unconsolidated fine grained sediments containing organic matter. Increased levels of organic matter in sands have shown an increase in the retardation of hydrophobic organic contaminants through the cap and encourage degradation of contaminant. Thus a careful balance of organics is necessary.

=== Geomembranes ===
Geomembranes can serve numerous purposes in a cap design, including “provide a bioturbation barrier; stabilize the cap; reduce contaminant flux; prevent mixing of cap materials with underlying sediments; promote uniform consolidation, and; reduce erosion of capping materials”. Geomembranes have been used for stabilization in two projects along with granular media for the ISC constructed at Sheboygan River and in Eitrheim Bay, Norway. Although geomembranes seem to have great benefits, the problem of uplift and ballooning has arisen and not much research has gone into assessing what causes the lift of the geomembranes off of the surface. Further research is needed to determine the overall effectiveness of geosynthetics for chemical isolation.

=== Cap armoring ===
Armoring stone, which is any stone that is used to "shield" the rest of the in-situ cap, can be used for resistance to erosion and should be considered in cap design. The long-term ability of the cap to perform depends primarily on its ability to withstand external forces, mostly hydraulic forces. There are three basic approaches that may be used to have long-term cap stability:

1. The cap layer needs to be armored sufficiently to hold up under the various hydraulic forces.
2. Cap at a deeper layer since hydraulic forces typically decrease with decreasing depth.
3. Try to control the hydraulic forces to limit their effect on the cap layer with breakwaters, dams, navigational controls, etc.

=== Bioturbation ===
Bioturbation is defined as the disturbance and mixing of sediments by benthic organisms. Many aquatic organisms live on or in the bottom sediments and can greatly increase the “migration of sediment contaminants through the direct movement of sediment particles, increasing the surface area of sediments exposed to the water column, and as a food for epibenthic or pelagic organism grazing on the benthos." The depth of bioturbation in marine environments is greater than that in fresh water environments. To prevent and reduce the impact of bioturbation on the cap, the cap should be designed with a sacrificial layer, typically only a few centimeters thick (5–10 cm). This layer will be assumed to be completely mixed with the environment and should prevent benthic organism from descending further into the in-situ cap. The thickness of the sacrificial layer should be based on a study of the local organisms and their behavior in the surrounding sediment near the area of the cap construction, since some benthic organisms have been known to burrow at depths of 1m or more. The presence of armor stone has been known to limit the colonization by deep burrowing benthic creatures. Another method of preventing benthic organisms from destroying the integrity of the cap design is to pick a granular media that the local benthic organism find unattractive and are not known to readily colonize on that surface, thus limiting the chance a benthic organism will grown on the cap.

The consolidation of the in-situ cap must be considered, provided that the selected material for the cap “is fine-grained granular material." The consolidation of the underlying material should be taken into account due to “advection of pore water upward into the cap during consolidation."

=== Erosional effects ===
Erosion should be carefully considered. To determine the level of protection against erosion it is important to look at “the potential severity of the environmental impacts associated with cap erosion and potential dispersion of the sediment contaminants in an extreme event” (such as a 100-year event). An under-designed in-situ cap could be compromised by erosion resulting in the release of contaminants. An over-designed cap would result in extremely high costs.

== Construction ==
Since the construction of the cap will directly affect the ability of the in-situ cap to perform it is important to plan carefully. Also, "many contaminated sediment sites exhibit exceedingly soft sediments that can be easily disturbed, may be dislocated or destabilized by uneven placement, and may have insufficient load bearing capacity to support some cap materials."

There are two basic was to construct an in-situ cap:

1. Land-based placement: this involves using equipment near the shore or working in narrow channels. The cap in constructed with standard construction equipment such as "backhoes, clamshells, dumped from trucks, and/or spread with bulldozers." The major limitation of this method is the reach of the equipment.
2. Pipeline or barge placement: this involves placing the in-situ cap with a barge or a pipeline. Using different types of equipment to place the cap components on the ocean bed or lake bed. This is typically the desired method when working in deep areas or offshore.

== Monitoring ==
=== Five steps for a monitoring program ===
Fredette et al. outlines five steps for the development of a physical/biological monitoring program for ISC projects:

1. Designating site-specific monitoring objectives
2. Identifying elements of the monitoring plan
3. Predicting responses and developing testable hypotheses
4. Designating sampling design and methods
5. Designating management options

Thus it is important a monitoring program be put into place at the onset of construction. A short-term monitoring program should be used to monitor the in-situ cap during construction and immediately following construction. This monitoring program should include frequent testing so real-time data is provided to allow quick adjustments to the overall cap design. A long-term monitoring program should be established to provide data about the overall effectiveness of the cap design and to make sure the cap is meeting all of its required regulations and that the cap is not excessively eroded. This long-term monitoring need only be assessed on a yearly to bi-yearly basis unless a problem is discovered; then more frequent testing will be required.

During monitoring, it is important to schedule routine maintenance. This may include placement of material equal to the predicted amount of material removed due to erosion.

== Case studies ==
Although ISC is a relatively new remediation procedure several groups have used it with great success.

=== General Motors Superfund Site ===
In Massena, New York, at the General Motors Superfund site, PCB-contaminated soils were dredged repeatedly but some areas still had high levels of contaminant (>10ppm). These areas were capped, an approximate area of 75,000 square feet (7,000 m^{2}), with a three-layer ISC composed of 6 inches of sand, 6 inches of gravel and 6 inches of armor stone.

=== Manistique River, Michigan ===
In Manistique River, Michigan, PCB-contaminated sediments were capped with a 40mm thick plastic liner over an area of 20,000 square feet (1,900 m^{2}) with varying depths of up to 15 ft.

=== Sheboygan River, Wisconsin ===
In Sheboygan River, Wisconsin, PCB-contaminated sediments were capped with a sand layer and armor stone layer. This was done in shallow regions were direct placement was possible.

=== Marathon Battery Remediation Project ===
In Cold Spring, New York, in the Hudson River, sediment was contaminated with cadmium and nickel from a battery manufacturing facility. A Geosynthetic clay liner (GCL) and a 12-inch covering of sandy loam was planted on top of the contaminated area.

=== Galaxy/Spectron Superfund Site ===
In Elkton, Maryland, contaminated sediment was discovered with excess amounts of volatile organic components and dense non-aqueous phase liquids, resulting is severe discharge. The cap system constructed over the contaminated waste involved a geotextile working mat, a GCL, a scrim-reinforced polypropylene liner, a geotextile cushion, and a gabion mat.

== Future research ==
There are four major areas of research that currently need to be assessed:

1. "Research into the fate and transport behavior of specific contaminants that do not behave in the simple manner assumed in current cap evaluation approaches (e.g. mercury)"
2. "Research into the fate processes associated with physical, chemical and biological gradients within a cap"
3. "Research into the influence of transport processes facilitated by nonaqueous phase liquid (NAPL) or gas migration"
4. "Research into cap amendments that may encourage sequestration or degradation fate processes"

== See also ==
- In situ oxidation
