= Sedimentation (water treatment) =

Water treatment process using gravity to remove suspended solids from water

The physical process of sedimentation (the act of depositing sediment) has applications in water treatment, whereby gravity acts to remove suspended solids from water. Solid particles entrained by the turbulence of moving water may be removed naturally by sedimentation in the still water of lakes and oceans. Settling basins are ponds constructed for the purpose of removing entrained solids by sedimentation. Clarifiers are tanks built with mechanical means for continuous removal of solids being deposited by sedimentation; however, clarification does not remove dissolved solids.

== Basics ==
Suspended solids (or SS), is the mass of dry solids retained by a filter of a given porosity related to the volume of the water sample. This includes particles 10 μm and greater.

Colloids are particles of a size between 1 nm (0.001 μm) and 1 μm depending on the method of quantification. Because of Brownian motion and electrostatic forces balancing the gravity, they are not likely to settle naturally.

The limit sedimentation velocity of a particle is its theoretical descending speed in clear and still water. In settling process theory, a particle will settle only if:

1. In a vertical ascending flow, the ascending water velocity is lower than the limit sedimentation velocity.
2. In a longitudinal flow, the ratio of the length of the tank to the height of the tank is higher than the ratio of the water velocity to the limit sedimentation velocity.

Removal of suspended particles by sedimentation depends upon the size, zeta potential and specific gravity of those particles. Suspended solids retained on a filter may remain in suspension if their specific gravity is similar to water while very dense particles passing through the filter may settle. Settleable solids are measured as the visible volume accumulated at the bottom of an Imhoff cone after water has settled for one hour.

Gravitational theory is employed, alongside the derivation from Newton's second law and the Navier–Stokes equations.

Stokes' law explains the relationship between the settling rate and the particle diameter. Under specific conditions, the particle settling rate is directly proportional to the square of particle diameter and inversely proportional to liquid viscosity.

The settling velocity, defined as the residence time taken for the particles to settle in the tank, enables the calculation of tank volume. Precise design and operation of a sedimentation tank is of high importance in order to keep the amount of sediment entering the diversion system to a minimum threshold by maintaining the transport system and stream stability to remove the sediment diverted from the system. This is achieved by reducing stream velocity as low as possible for the longest period of time possible. This is feasible by widening the approach channel and lowering its floor to reduce flow velocity thus allowing sediment to settle out of suspension due to gravity. The settling behavior of heavier particulates is also affected by the turbulence.

== Designs ==
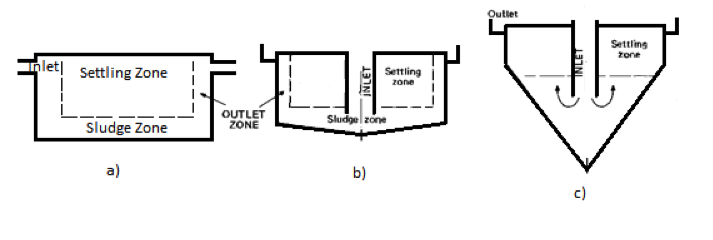
Figure 1. Different clarifier designs

Although sedimentation might occur in tanks of other shapes, removal of accumulated solids is easiest with conveyor belts in rectangular tanks or with scrapers rotating around the central axis of circular tanks. Settling basins and clarifiers should be designed based on the settling velocity (v_{s}) of the smallest particle to be theoretically 100% removed. The overflow rate is defined as:

Overflow rate (v_{o} ) = Flow of water (Q (m^{3}/s)) /(Surface area of settling basin (A(m^{2}))

In many countries this value is named as surface loading in m^{3}/h per m^{2}. Overflow rate is often used for flow over an edge (for example a weir) in the unit m^{3}/h per m.

The unit of overflow rate is usually meters (or feet) per second, a velocity. Any particle with settling velocity (v_{s}) greater than the overflow rate will settle out, while other particles will settle in the ratio v_{s}/v_{o}. There are recommendations on the overflow rates for each design that ideally take into account the change in particle size as the solids move through the operation:

- Quiescent zones: 9.4 mm (0.031 ft) per second
- Full-flow basins: 4.0 mm (0.013 ft) per second
- Off-line basins: 0.46 mm (0.0015 ft) per second

However, factors such as flow surges, wind shear, scour, and turbulence reduce the effectiveness of settling. To compensate for these less than ideal conditions, it is recommended doubling the area calculated by the previous equation. It is also important to equalize flow distribution at each point across the cross-section of the basin. Poor inlet and outlet designs can produce extremely poor flow characteristics for sedimentation.

Settling basins and clarifiers can be designed as long rectangles (Figure 1.a), that are hydraulically more stable and easier to control for large volumes. Circular clarifiers (Fig. 1.b) work as a common thickener (without the usage of rakes), or as upflow tanks (Fig. 1.c).

Sedimentation efficiency does not depend on the tank depth. If the forward velocity is low enough so that the settled material does not re-suspend from the tank floor, the area is still the main parameter when designing a settling basin or clarifier, taking care that the depth is not too low.

== Assessment of main process characteristics ==
Settling basins and clarifiers are designed to retain water so that suspended solids can settle. By sedimentation principles, the suitable treatment technologies should be chosen depending on the specific gravity, size and shear resistance of particles. Depending on the size and density of particles, and physical properties of the solids, there are four types of sedimentation processes:

- Type 1 – Dilutes, non-flocculent, free-settling (every particle settles independently.)
- Type 2 – Dilute, flocculent (particles can flocculate as they settle).
- Type 3 – Concentrated suspensions, zone settling, hindered settling (sludge thickening).
- Type 4 – Concentrated suspensions, compression (sludge thickening).

Different factors control the sedimentation rate in each.

=== Settling of discrete particles ===
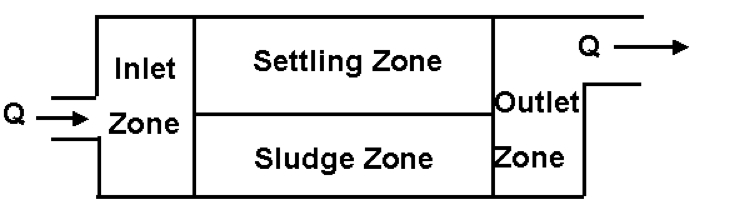
Figure 2. The four functional zones of a continuous flow settling basin

Unhindered settling is a process that removes the discrete particles in a very low concentration without interference from nearby particles. In general, if the concentration of the solutions is lower than 500 mg/L total suspended solids, sedimentation will be considered discrete. Concentrations of raceway effluent total suspended solids (TSS) in the west are usually less than 5 mg/L net. TSS concentrations of off-line settling basin effluent are less than 100 mg/L net. The particles keep their size and shape during discrete settling, with an independent velocity. With such low concentrations of suspended particles, the probability of particle collisions is very low and consequently the rate of flocculation is small enough to be neglected for most calculations. Thus the surface area of the settling basin becomes the main factor of sedimentation rate. All continuous flow settling basins are divided into four parts: inlet zone, settling zone, sludge zone and outlet zone (Figure 2).

In the inlet zone, flow is established in a same forward direction. Sedimentation occurs in the settling zone as the water flow towards to outlet zone. The clarified liquid is then flow out from outlet zone. Sludge zone: settled will be collected here and usually we assume that it is removed from water flow once the particles arrives the sludge zone.

In an ideal rectangular sedimentation tank, in the settling zone, the critical particle enters at the top of the settling zone, and the settle velocity would be the smallest value to reach the sludge zone, and at the end of outlet zone, the velocity component of this critical particle are the settling velocity in vertical direction (v_{s}) and in horizontal direction (v_{h}).

From Figure 1, the time needed for the particle to settle;

t_{o} =H/v_{h}=L/v_{s} (3)

Since the surface area of the tank is WL, and v_{s} = Q/WL, v_{h} = Q/WH, where Q is the flow rate and W, L, H is the width, length, depth of the tank.

According to Eq. 1, this also is a basic factor that can control the sedimentation tank performance which called overflow rate.

Eq. 2 also shows that the depth of sedimentation tank is independent to the sedimentation efficiency, only if the forward velocity is low enough to make sure the settled mass would not suspended again from the tank floor.

=== Settlement of flocculent particles ===
In a horizontal sedimentation tank, some particles may not follow the diagonal line in Fig. 1, while settling faster as they grow. So this says that particles can grow and develop a higher settling velocity if a greater depth with longer retention time. However, the collision chance would be even greater if the same retention time were spread over a longer, shallower tank. In fact, in order to avoid hydraulic short-circuiting, tanks usually are made 3–6 m deep with retention times of a few hours.

=== Zone-settling behaviour ===
As the concentration of particles in a suspension is increased, a point is reached where particles are so close together that they no longer settle independently of one another and the velocity fields of the fluid displaced by adjacent particles, overlap. There is also a net upward flow of liquid displaced by the settling particles. This results in a reduced particle-settling velocity and the effect is known as hindered settling.

There is a common case for hindered settling occurs. the whole suspension tends to settle as a ‘blanket’ due to its extremely high particle concentration. This is known as zone settling, because it is easy to make a distinction between several different zones which separated by concentration discontinuities. Fig. 3 represents a typical batch-settling column tests on a suspension exhibiting zone-settling characteristics. There is a clear interface near the top of the column would be formed to separating the settling sludge mass from the clarified supernatant as long as leaving such a suspension to stand in a settling column. As the suspension settles, this interface will move down at the same speed. At the same time, there is an interface near the bottom between that settled suspension and the suspended blanket. After settling of suspension is complete, the bottom interface would move upwards and meet the top interface which moves downwards.

=== Compression settling ===
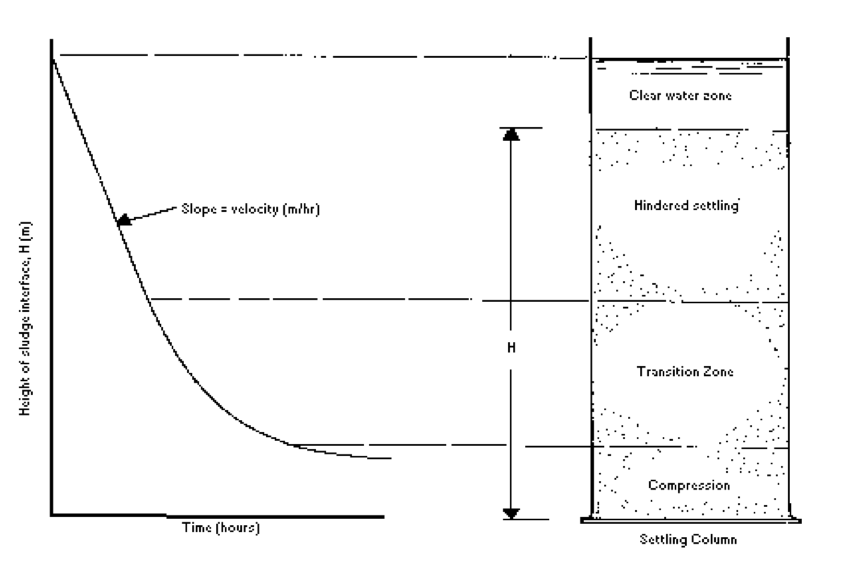
Figure3: Typical batch-settling column test on a suspension exhibiting zone-settling characteristics

The settling particles can contact each other and arise when approaching the floor of the sedimentation tanks at very high particle concentration. So that further settling will only occur in adjust matrix as the sedimentation rate decreasing. This is can be illustrated by the lower region of the zone-settling diagram (Figure 3). In Compression zone, the settled solids are compressed by gravity (the weight of solids), as the settled solids are compressed under the weight of overlying solids, and water is squeezed out while the space gets smaller.

== Applications ==
=== Potable water treatment ===
Sedimentation in potable water treatment generally follows a step of chemical coagulation and flocculation, which allows grouping particles together into flocs of a bigger size. This increases the settling speed of suspended solids and allows settling colloids.

=== Wastewater treatment ===
Sedimentation has been used to treat wastewater for millennia.

Primary treatment of sewage is removal of floating and settleable solids through sedimentation. Primary clarifiers reduce the content of suspended solids as well as the pollutant embedded in the suspended solids. Because of the large amount of reagent necessary to treat domestic wastewater, preliminary chemical coagulation and flocculation are generally not used, remaining suspended solids being reduced by following stages of the system. However, coagulation and flocculation can be used for building a compact treatment plant (also called a "package treatment plant"), or for further polishing of the treated water.

Sedimentation tanks called "secondary clarifiers" remove flocs of biological growth created in some methods of secondary treatment including activated sludge, trickling filters and rotating biological contactors.

== See also ==
- API oil-water separator
- Dissolved air flotation
- List of waste-water treatment technologies
- Sewage treatment
- Total suspended solids

== Bibliography ==
- Weber, Walter J., Jr. Physicochemical Processes for Water Quality Control. John Wiley & Sons (1972). ISBN 0-471-92435-0.
