= Suspended solids =

Small solid particles in liquids

Suspended solids refers to small solid particles which remain in suspension in water as a colloid or due to motion of the water. Suspended solids can be removed by sedimentation if their size or density is comparatively large, or by filtration. It is used as one indicator of water quality and of the strength of sewage, or wastewater in general. It is an important design parameter for sewage treatment processes.

It is sometimes abbreviated SS, but is not to be confused with settleable solids, also abbreviated SS, which contribute to the blocking of sewer pipes.

== Explanation ==
Suspended solids are important as pollutants and pathogens are carried on the surface of particles. The smaller the particle size, the greater the total surface area per unit mass of particle in grams, and so the higher the pollutant load that is likely to be carried.

== Removal ==
Removal of suspended solids is generally achieved through the use of sedimentation and/or water filters (usually at a municipal level). By eliminating most of the suspended solids in a water supply, the significant water is usually rendered close to drinking quality. This is followed by disinfection to ensure that any free floating pathogens, or pathogens associated with the small remaining amount of suspended solids, are rendered ineffective.

== Effectiveness of filtering ==
The use of a very simple cloth filter, consisting of a folded cotton sari, drastically reduces the load of cholera carried in the water, and is suitable for use by the very poor; in this case, an appropriate technology method of disinfection might be added, such as solar water disinfection.

A major exception to this generalization is arsenic contamination of groundwater, as arsenic is a very serious pollutant which is soluble, and thus not removed when suspended solids are removed. This makes it very difficult to remove, and finding an alternative water source is often the most realistic option.

== See also ==
- Bottom trawling
- Total suspended solids
- Turbidity
