= Settling basin =

Wastewater treatment structure

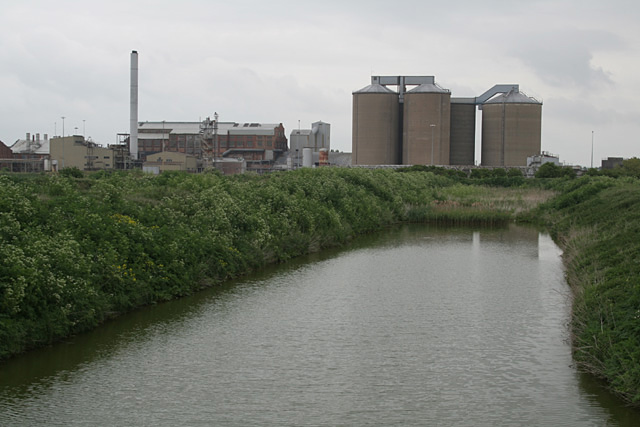
Settling pond at the Bardney sugar factory in Lincolnshire, England

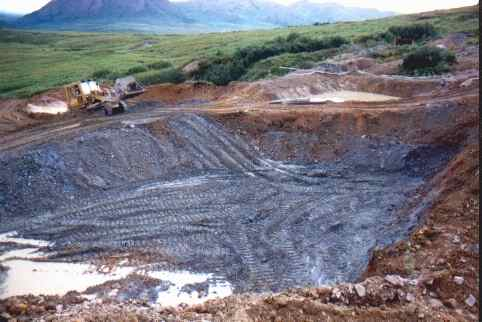
Settling pond under construction, Blue Ribbon Mine, Alaska

A settling basin, settling pond or decant pond is an earthen or concrete structure using sedimentation to remove settleable matter and turbidity from wastewater. The basins are used to control water pollution in diverse industries such as agriculture, aquaculture, and mining. Turbidity is an optical property of water caused by scattering of light by material suspended in that water. Although turbidity often varies directly with weight or volumetric measurements of settleable matter, correlation is complicated by variations in size, shape, refractive index, and specific gravity of suspended matter. Settling ponds may be ineffective at reducing turbidity caused by small particles with specific gravity low enough to be suspended by Brownian motion.

== Applications ==
Settling basins are used as a separation mechanism to eliminate rejected products (i.e. waste solids management strategies) of a specified size and quantity in various fields, such as aquaculture, mining, dairy, food processing, alcohol production and wine making. Regular draining and desilting of settling basins is required to maintain satisfactory performance.

=== Aquaculture ===
All materials not removed from the system during harvesting are categorized as wastes including uneaten feed, excreta, chemicals and therapeutics, dead and moribund fish, escaped fish and pathogens. Settling basins in the field are simple ponds dug downstream of the farm to optimally remove suspended solids effectively, produce clarified effluent, and accumulate and thicken sludge to minimal volume. If impairment occurs in any of these functions, this might have a great impact on pond performance, which could lead to damaging the effectiveness of the process.

=== Mining ===
Wastewater produced by mining industries contribute to the acidity, suspended material and dissolved heavy metal ions in the aquatic environment, causing environmental problems for biological life and discoloration of the receiving waters. The application of settling basins by the Coeur d'Alene mining district of northern Idaho, United States, globally known to produce lead, zinc and silver, to treat wastewater has greatly improved the quality of water discharge from mining operations.

=== Dairy waste ===
By reducing flow velocity to limit solids being transported along with fast flowing liquid, separation can occur. Approximately 35–60% of the solids are removed from dilute liquid slurry, with 10 minutes detention time, with a common detention time of 30 to 60 minutes. Due to the inadequate consideration of critical design criteria, most settling basins built were oversized and had low efficiency.

Settling basins used in dairy production reduce the nutrient-loading on a vegetative filter strip from lot runoff, thus decreasing the required lagoon volume for a new facility. Moreover, settling basins are useful to remove unwanted solid materials, such as hay, straw and feathers from the waste stream before flowing to the lagoon, aid to reduce smell and avoid crust formation on the lagoon surface. A baffle may be used to retain the floating solids removed. There are two types of settling basins, based on the method of removing solids. With one type, the solids are removed mechanically (after the free water has drained away), usually with a front-end or skid-steer loader. The other type uses hydraulic (pump) removal of the solids. Typically, pumping is initiated when the basin is half full of solids and the remainder is water. Vigorous agitation is needed to mix the liquid and the solids, preferably by propeller-type agitators or pumps with agitation nozzles.

== Advantages and limitations over competitive processes ==
Settling basins are designed to retain water long enough so that suspended solids can settle to obtain a high purity water in the outlet and to provide the opportunity for pH adjustment. Other processes that could be used: thickeners, clarifiers, hydro cyclones and membrane filtration are highly used techniques in the field. Compared to those processes, settling basins have a simpler and cheaper design, with fewer moving parts, demanding less maintenance, despite requiring cleaning and vacuuming of the quiescent zones at least once every two weeks.

However, settling basins can introduce new kinds of water contamination, particularly if the water supply is from a well. The basin can catch windblown contaminants, and if the water is retained for a long period, algae grows in the pool, leading to greater filtration problems. Settling ponds may also be ineffective at reducing turbidity caused by small particles with specific gravity low enough to be suspended by Brownian motion. Usually, it can only remove particles ranging from sand (2 mm in diameter) to silt (0.002 mm in diameter).

== Design considerations ==
Wastewater enters the basin and very fine particles in the water are separated by means of gravity. The water must be in the basin long enough for the desired particle size to be removed. Smaller particles require longer periods for removal and thus larger basins. In some basins a flocculant may be added to help smaller particles stick together and form larger particles. Stokes' law can be used to calculate the size of a settling basin needed in order to remove a desired particle size. Stokes' law gives a settling velocity determining an effective settling basin depth; so solids removal depends upon effective settling basin surface area, while the depth component of settling basin volume remains important for storage of settled solids.

Translation of required settling time surface area to settling basin geometry requires consideration of short circuiting and turbulence induced by wind, bottom scour, or inlet and overflow design. Settling basin geometry is important because effective time of settling within the basin will be the time a volume of water spends in non-turbulent conditions before reaching the settling basin overflow. Median time is always less than the mean time calculated by dividing available volume by anticipated flow. The median time of passage through a short, wide settling basin may be significantly less than that through a long, narrow settling basin. Settling basins with overflow structures near the entrance points may hold a large volume of stagnant water while newly admitted water rapidly reaches the overflow point before settling can occur. Effective surface area for settling seldom extends perpendicularly more than a tenth the distance of a flow line from basin entrance to overflow unless baffles are installed. Effective surface area and geometry may change as accumulating sediment fills part of the originally constructed volume. Short cut channels may rapidly form through heavier sediment accumulations near the entrance to the settling basin. Flow through shallow portions of the settling basin may cause turbulence resuspending sediment from the bottom of the basin. Two feet has been recommended as a minimum settling basin depth to avoid bottom scour.

== See also ==
- Clarifier
- Water purification
- Detention basin
- Retention basin
- Industrial wastewater treatment
- Stabilization pond
- Sediment basin

== Sources ==
- Goldman, Steven J.; Jackson, Katharine; Bursztynsky, Taras A. (1986). Erosion & Sediment Control Handbook. McGraw-Hill. ISBN 0-07-023655-0.
