= Non-aqueous phase liquid =

Liquid solution contaminants that do not dissolve in or easily mix with water

Non-aqueous phase liquids, or NAPLs, are organic liquid contaminants characterized by their relative immiscibility with water. Common examples of NAPLs are petroleum products, coal tars, chlorinated solvents, and pesticides. Strategies employed for their removal from the subsurface environment have expanded since the late-20th century.

NAPLs can be released into the environment from a variety of point sources such as improper chemical disposal, leaking underground storage tanks, septic tank effluent, and percolation from spills or landfills. The movement of NAPLs within the subsurface environment is complex and difficult to characterize. Nonetheless, the various parameters that dictate their movement are important to understand in order to determine appropriate remediation strategies. These strategies use NAPLs' physical, chemical, and biological properties to minimize their presence in the subsurface.

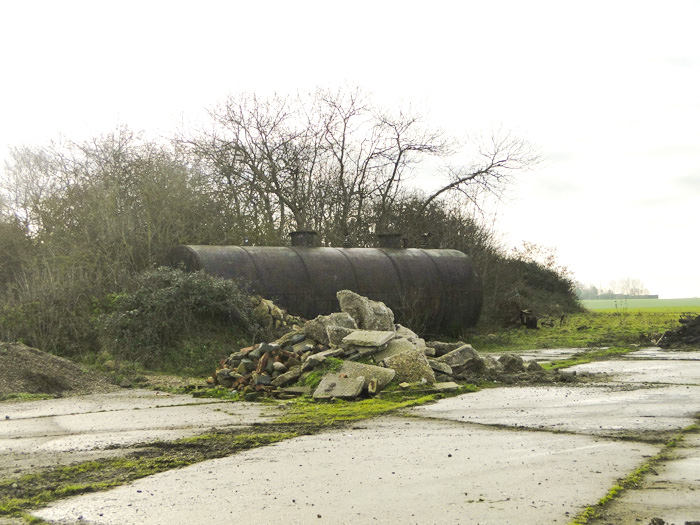
Underground fuel storage tank above ground. Leakage of underground storage tanks (LUSTs) are a common point-source of NAPL pollution.

== History ==
=== Attitudes about groundwater contamination before 1978 ===
Groundwater has been a historically important source of water for public water systems, privately owned wells, and agricultural systems for generations. It had been commonly believed that as water traveled through soil, it was stripped of impurities before it could enter groundwater storages; as a result, there wasn't much general concern about contamination of the subsurface environment.

In 1960, organic contaminants, including petroleum hydrocarbons, coal tar derivatives, synthetic detergents, and pesticides, had been noted in an extensive literature survey of groundwater contamination that provided the first indication of NAPLs in the subsurface. By the early 1970s, the technological development of gas chromatography provided a new method to detect groundwater contaminants imperceptible to the human senses. This development lead to the discovery and subsequent analysis of chlorinated solvents, one of the most deleterious forms of NAPL. It became understood that NAPLs are challenging both to detect and to remove from the subsurface. Because NAPLs participate in a biological chain of degradation, they produce intermediate chemicals that create particularly acute dangers for human health.

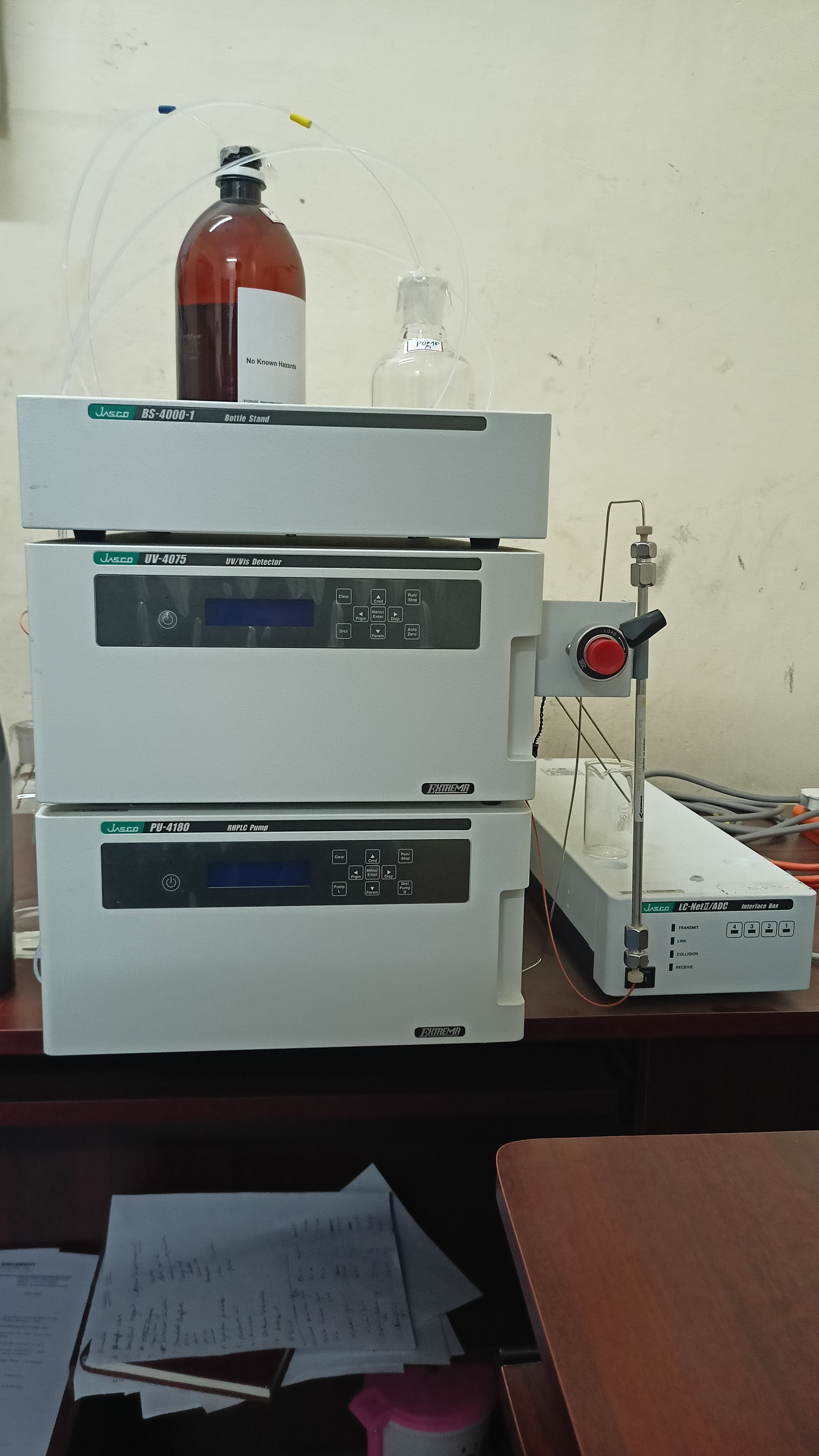
High performance liquid chromatography apparatus used to find unknown compounds. This type of equipment revolutionized the detection of subsurface contaminants.

=== Expansion of groundwater contamination research after 1978 ===
These health concerns became more prevalent in the public eye after the 1976 Niagara Falls Gazette report of soil contamination near Love Canal. The discovery of such high volumes of these contaminants, their widespread geographical extent, and their dangerous health effects eventually led to the passage of the Comprehensive Environmental Response, Compensation, and Liability Act (CERCLA) and Superfund. This increased attention to groundwater contamination expanded research funds, and the studies that followed revealed widespread groundwater contamination in the United States. Subsequently, the understanding of transport mechanisms and the development of remediation strategies for organic contaminants, including NAPLs, have been expanded.

Map of Superfund sites in the United States. Red sites are on the National Priority List, yellow sites are proposed, green is deleted (usually meaning having been cleaned up). Data from United States EPA CERCLIS database, retrieved 12 February 2015 with last update reported as 25 October 2013.

Early remediation strategies focused on the restoration of aquifer quality via the construction of wells to extract and treat groundwater (the pump-and-treat strategy), but it soon became clear that the volume of water to be extracted and treated was unreasonably large and unfeasible. Additionally, the construction of wells can be invasive to the subsurface environment and can cause deeper infiltration of NAPLs, which is counter-productive. While some experts have proposed that the complete removal of NAPLs from the subsurface environment is impossible, others view the challenge as an opportunity to expand and innovate remediation technologies. As a result, a variety of innovations to both detect and mitigate NAPLs have been developed from the 1980s to the mid-2000s providing alternatives to the pump-and-treat strategy.

== Transport mechanisms ==
A depiction of the subsurface environment. The vadose zone and the saturated zone can be distinguished by the relative abundance of liquid water, and are separated by the capillary fringe.

The behavior of NAPLs in the subsurface is guided by both the composition of the subsurface material and the various properties of the NAPLs. The subsurface can be categorized into two primary zones: the unsaturated (vadose) zone, which includes small grains or particles surrounded by a thin film of water; and the saturated (phreatic) zone, which contains important storages of groundwater called aquifers.

NAPLs are point-source pollutants, and they can be released from a variety of sources, including, but not limited to, improper chemical disposal, leaking underground storage tanks, septic tank effluent, and percolation from spills or landfills. Under high precipitation conditions, liquid will infiltrate the unsaturated zone; if there is enough volume of liquid, it will then percolate into the saturated zone. The porosity of the subsurface environment will determine the quantity that manages to enter the saturated zone.

=== Physical properties of NAPLs ===
The microscopic properties of NAPLs determine their behavior in the field. If they enter the saturated zone, their density relative to that of water will determine how they behave. As a result, NAPLs are categorized based on their relative density into two primary types: light non-aqueous phase liquids (LNAPLs) and dense non-aqueous phase liquids (DNAPLs). LNAPLs tend to float on the water table, while DNAPLs tend to sink downward and, in some conditions, pool at the bottom. Compared to LNAPLs, DNAPLs are more toxic and less biodegradable.

There are a variety of parameters specific to the subsurface environment that are important to consider in quantitative models of NAPL behavior. Some of these parameters include soil permeability, moisture, particle size distribution, capillary force, wettability, and ground water flow velocity. The collection of this data is heterogeneous and complex in nature.

==== Multi-phase model ====
LNAPLs and DNAPLs can exist in multiple different phases simultaneously upon entering the subsurface environment. The composition of NAPLs is typically described using a multi-phase model that depends on a variety of complex and interrelated parameters, including, but not limited to, viscosity, solubility, and volatility; the possible phases of NAPL include gaseous, solid, aqueous, and immiscible hydrocarbon.

The liquid phase of NAPLs is characterized by a physical dividing surface that separates it from the liquid phase of water, indicating immiscibility due to NAPLs' organic structure. That said, some chemical compounds within the NAPL are capable of solubilizing into water, meaning that two liquid phases of NAPL (immiscible hydrocarbon and aqueous solute) can exist simultaneously. The gaseous phase of NAPLs is also responsible for the contamination of groundwater and soil; therefore, the distribution of NAPLs between its various phases is important to quantify in order to assess the extent of contamination and to determine appropriate remediation strategies.

=== Movement of NAPLs in the unsaturated zone ===
The unsaturated zone involves a porous media which consists of small particles, around which exist a thin film of water which acts as a membrane. The rest of the space between these particles consists of air. Thus, NAPLs can either remain as an immiscible hydrocarbon, dissolve into water, adsorb onto solid porous material, or vaporize into gaseous form.

This four-phase model is highly variable and can even change within a particular site during different stages of site remediation. As such, it is important to continuously monitor the phase distribution on a case-by-case basis. Each of these phases differs in terms of their mobility and their available remediation techniques. The most mobile phases of NAPL are the volatilized/gaseous phase and the solubilized/aqueous phase, while the least mobile phases of NAPL are the adsorbed/solid phase and the immiscible liquid phase. Because of these complexities, flow is more difficult to measure in the unsaturated zone than in the saturated zone.

Contamination of the unsaturated zone is dangerous because of both the potential to seep into the saturated zone, where aquifers are contained, and the potential to harm ecological life. Whether or not the NAPL reaches the saturated zone is determined by a parameter called residual saturation. Residual saturation is caused by capillary action, which immobilizes NAPLs and restricts their infiltration into the saturated zone.

=== Movement of NAPLs in the saturated zone ===
In the saturated zone, the spaces between particles are filled with water. As such, a three-phase model of NAPL phase distribution is used in this zone, which excludes the gaseous phase. Once NAPLs reach the water table in the saturated zone, LNAPLs will float while DNAPLs will sink. Both LNAPLs and DNAPLs can remain in the water table for long periods of time, slowly dissolving and forming harmful chemical plumes; for this reason, remediation in the saturated zone is of particular importance to scientists.

==== DNAPL behavior in the saturated zone ====
The liquid phases of DNAPLs will continue to move vertically downward through the saturated zone until either their volume is exhausted by residual saturation or their path is intercepted by the layer of low permeability, at which point the DNAPLs will begin to migrate horizontally. if the lower permeability boundary is bowl-shaped, the DNAPL can form a pond-like reservoir. Contrarily, both the residually saturated and adsorbed DNAPL phases are relatively immobile and more difficult to remove. DNAPL movement in the saturated zone can also be influenced by anthropogenic activity, including unsealed boreholes and improperly sealed sampling holes and monitoring wells.

== Remediation strategies ==
A relatively small volume of NAPL can create toxic groundwater conditions, and NAPLs can remain in the subsurface, continually polluting groundwater, for decades or even centuries. Moreover, NAPLs are difficult to detect, particularly because of their multi-phase behavior. As a result, detection strategies, in addition to remediation strategies, are important in the effort to remove NAPLs from the environment. In this sense, it is important to quantify the geographic and phase distributions of NAPLs in addition to where they have been and where they may be going.

In order to determine site-specific characteristics e.g. soil material and water table parameters, drill cuttings and cores can be used. Soil gas surveys can be used as a preliminary screening procedure to determine the extent of contamination due to volatile components. Some of the current strategies to detect and analyze NAPL presence include gas chromatography, high pressure liquid chromatography, and time domain reflectometry. That said, additional research in this area is warranted.

=== Remediation of DNAPLs ===
Mitigation of LNAPLs tends to be less complex and require simpler engineering strategies. Conversely, DNAPLs can seep into cracks in the parent material of the subsurface, complicating both their movement and the technology required for their mitigation. In a best-case scenario, the DNAPL is continuous and has collected as a reservoir above the impermeable layer. In this scenario, a recovery well can be drilled and installed. When it comes to DNAPL remediation, the earlier it is removed, the better.

=== Physical strategies ===
==== Well drilling ====
Some of the purposes of well drilling include: personal use, measurements of hydraulic head, aquifer testing, and remediation of various contaminants. "Pump-and-treat" is particularly effective for removing LNAPLs floating above the water table. Efforts must be taken during well drilling to minimize disturbances that might cause further infiltration of DNAPLs into the subsurface. It is easy to unknowingly drill through a DNAPL pool, causing the pool to drain down further into the aquifer.

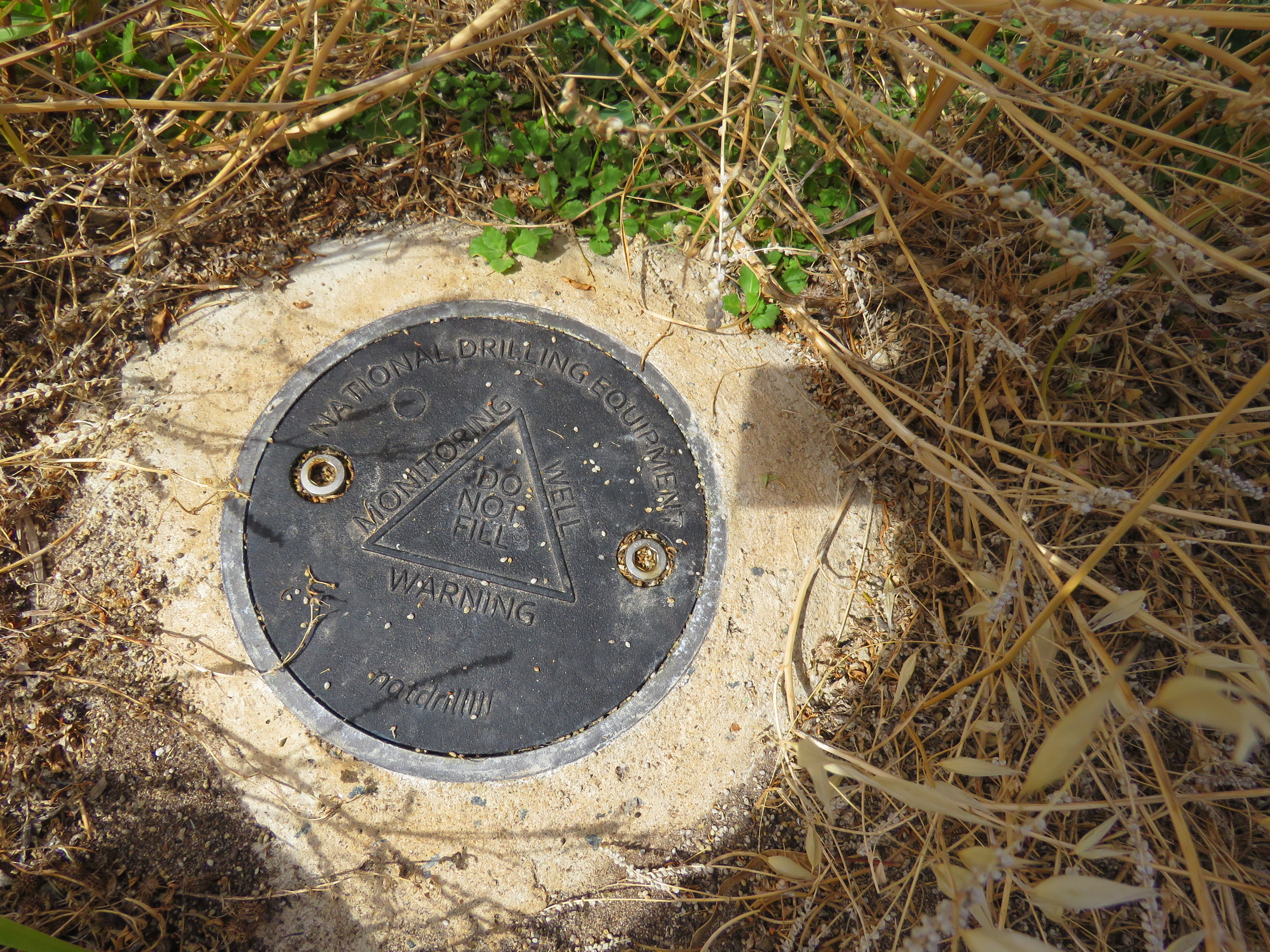
A monitoring well at Lake Richmond, Western Australia, one of a number dotted around the lake shore.

While it is possible to study the direction and movement of groundwater flow via well drilling, this method is not always effective for determining the movement of NAPLs because they can flow in different directions. Some related strategies to determine the horizontal and vertical extent of NAPL presence use NAPLs' chemical properties, such as time domain reflectometry which uses NAPLs' relative electrical permittivity.

Because the pump-and-treat strategy involves the uptake of an unrealistically high volume of groundwater, the overall philosophy has shifted from "total capture" to containment strategies, which involve the use of physical structures to control the movement of aqueous-phase plumes. The highly corrosive nature of NAPLs can increase maintenance problems associated with these physical structures. Some examples of these structures include slurry barriers, vibrating beam barriers, jet grout walls, and geomembrane liners.

==== Surfactants ====
The purpose of surfactants is to mobilize various components of NAPLs by lowering their viscosity and interfacial tension. Solubilizing agents increase the solubility of NAPLs and transfer it to the aqueous phase, allowing it to then be extracted and treated. Mobilizing agents target the residually saturated component of NAPL, allowing it to be displaced by continuous flooding. While surfactants are highly effective, resulting in recovery of 94% of the original DNAPL in case studies, they are also expensive and cost-prohibitive, also potentially adversely affecting the pH of the subsurface environment.

==== Soil vacuum extraction ====
This form of remediation is possibly the most widely accepted in-situ technology for the removal of NAPLs in the unsaturated zone. Soil vacuum extraction (SVE) increases the volatility of NAPLs by using a vacuum that induces air flow. This process transforms NAPL into the gaseous phase and then strips those gaseous components from the subsurface, allowing them to be extracted and treated. Less volatile compounds can have their volatility increased using the application of heat, which is then followed with SVE. Multiphase extraction involves an 18–26 inch mercury vacuum that can simultaneously extract gaseous, aqueous, and immiscible phases of NAPL. Additionally, SVE is thought to enhance aerobic degradation of NAPLs, improving cost effectiveness by reducing the amount of required above-ground treatment.

=== Chemical strategies ===
Chemical remediation strategies typically involve redox reactions, the most common of which include direct chemical oxidation, direct chemical reduction, secondary oxidation of reduction, and metal-enhanced dechlorination. The appropriate treatment depends largely on the specific contaminant. Chemical strategies are the most direct and fast method to remediate chlorinated solvents, which are one of the most prevalent types of NAPL.

One challenge when it comes to chemical strategies is the existence of competitive reactions that limit treatment effectiveness. Another challenge is the presence of byproducts that might lead to the spreading of the targeted contaminant.

Application techniques include injection via wells or the placement of a solid treatment matrix. Ultimately, the most important factor that determines the viability of a chemical treatment approach is whether the subsurface conditions will allow for effective application.

=== Biological strategies ===
It has become possible to accelerate natural aerobic, anaerobic, and sequential aerobic and/or anaerobic biological processes to minimize the presence of NAPLs in the subsurface environment. Most bioremediation strategies rely on the presence of specific populations of bacteria/microorganisms and the addition of organic carbon to stimulate biodegradation. This organic carbon can be supplied via injection of soluble organic carbon sources such as lactate, alcohols, cheese whey, etc. and placement of slow-release electron donors such as vegetable oil and soybean oil emulsions.

Sufficient dissolved oxygen must be present for aerobic biodegradation, which can be supplied through strategies including air sparging and SVE. That said, the ability to supply sufficient oxygen is a limiting factor affecting the success of this type of remediation strategy. Also, many cases require the presence of inducers such as methane, propane, ammonia, or toluene, which are contaminants in and of themselves that are inherently harmful to the subsurface environment.

Yet another challenge is maintaining a sufficient population of bacteria/microorganisms in the face of competition from native bacteria and other external pressures. There is also regulatory pushback to the use of genetically modified bacteria. Furthermore, NAPLs may not be readily bioavailable, limiting the effectiveness of biodegradation strategies. In this sense, biodegradation may not be appropriate as a single solution, but it can certainly be used in conjunction with other strategies.
