= Clarifier =

Settling tanks for continuous removal of solids being deposited by sedimentation

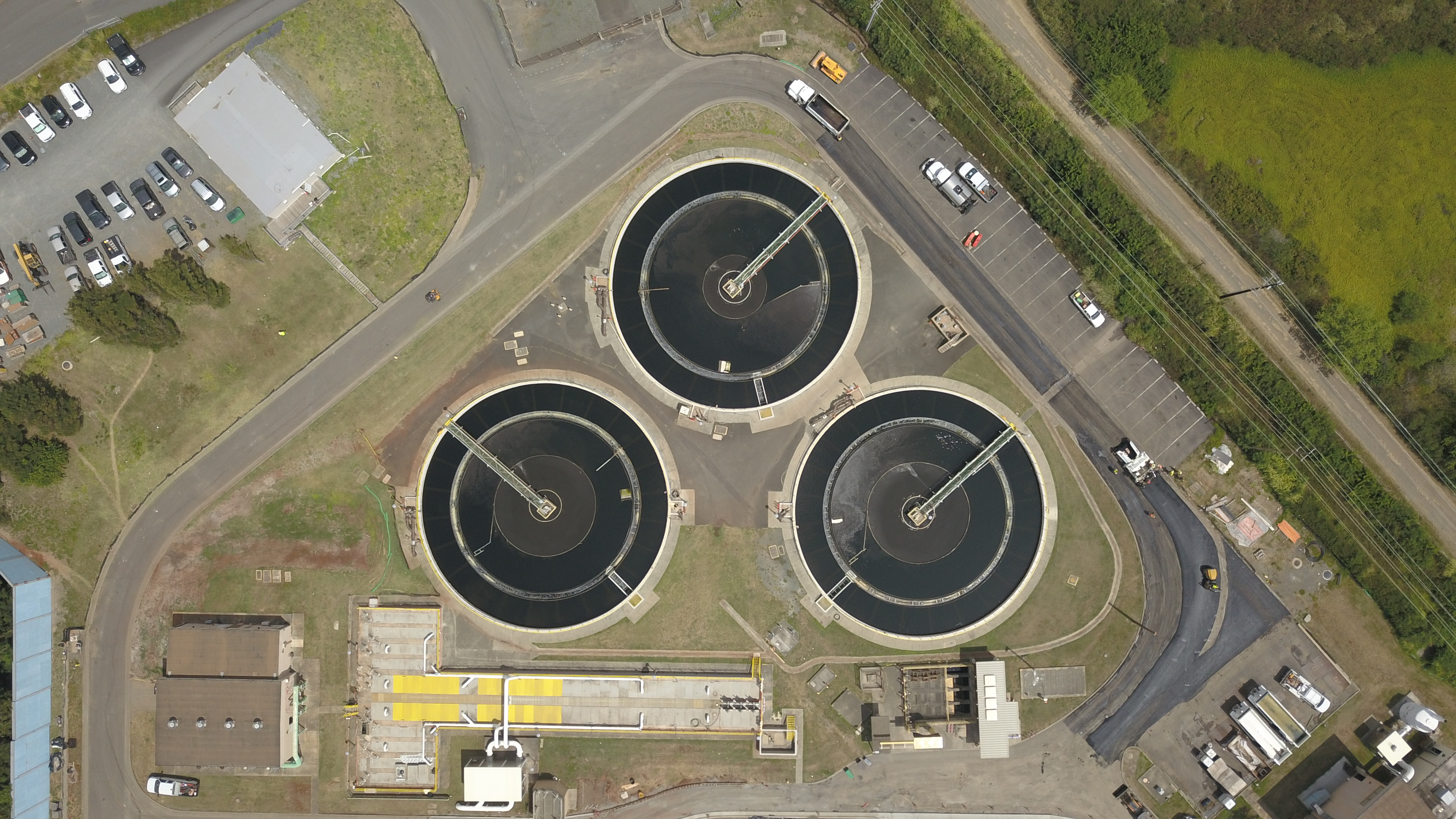
Three wastewater/sewage clarifiers at the ʻAikahi wastewater treatment plant in Hawaii. They appear to have a floating cover to reduce the odor because the plant is very close to a residential area.

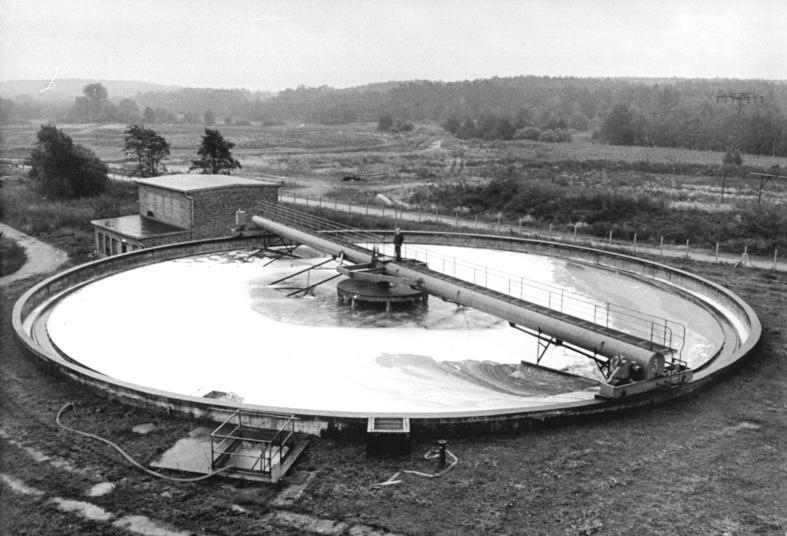
Circular clarifier with surface skimmer visible in the lower right. As the skimmer slowly rotates around the clarifier, skimmed floating material is pushed into the trap visible above the fenced enclosure at the lower left.

Clarifiers are settling tanks built with mechanical means for continuous removal of solids being deposited by sedimentation. A clarifier is generally used to remove solid particulates or suspended solids from liquid for clarification and/or thickening. Inside the clarifier, solid contaminants will settle down to the bottom of the tank where it is collected by a scraper mechanism. Concentrated impurities, discharged from the bottom of the tank, are known as sludge, while the particles that float to the surface of the liquid are called scum.

== Applications ==
=== Pretreatment ===
Before the water enters the clarifier, coagulation and flocculation reagents, such as polyelectrolytes and ferric sulfate, can be added. These reagents cause finely suspended particles to clump together and form larger and denser particles, called flocs, that settle more quickly and stably. This allows the separation of the solids in the clarifier to occur more efficiently and easily, aiding in the conservation of energy. Isolating the particle components first using these processes may reduce the volume of downstream water treatment processes like filtration.

=== Potable water treatment ===
Drinking water, water being purified for human consumption, is treated with flocculation reagents, then sent to the clarifier where removal of the flocculated coagulate occurs producing clarified water. The clarifier works by permitting the heavier and larger particles to settle to the bottom of the clarifier. The particles then form a bottom layer of sludge requiring regular removal and disposal. Clarified water then proceeds through several more steps before being sent for storage and use.

=== Wastewater treatment ===
Sedimentation tanks have been used to treat wastewater for millennia.

Primary treatment of sewage is removal of floating and settleable solids through sedimentation. Primary clarifiers reduce the content of suspended solids and pollutants embedded in those suspended solids. Because of the large amount of reagent necessary to treat domestic wastewater, preliminary chemical coagulation and flocculation are generally not used, remaining suspended solids being reduced by following stages of the system. However, coagulation and flocculation can be used for building a compact treatment plant (also called a "package treatment plant"), or for further polishing of the treated water.

Sedimentation tanks called 'secondary clarifiers' remove flocs of biological growth created in some methods of secondary treatment including activated sludge, trickling filters and rotating biological contactors.

=== Mining ===
Methods used to treat suspended solids in mining wastewater include sedimentation and floc blanket clarification and filtration. Sedimentation is used by Rio Tinto Minerals to refine raw ore into refined borates. After dissolving the ore, the saturated borate solution is pumped into a large settling tank. Borates float on top of the liquor while rock and clay settles to the bottom.

== Technology ==
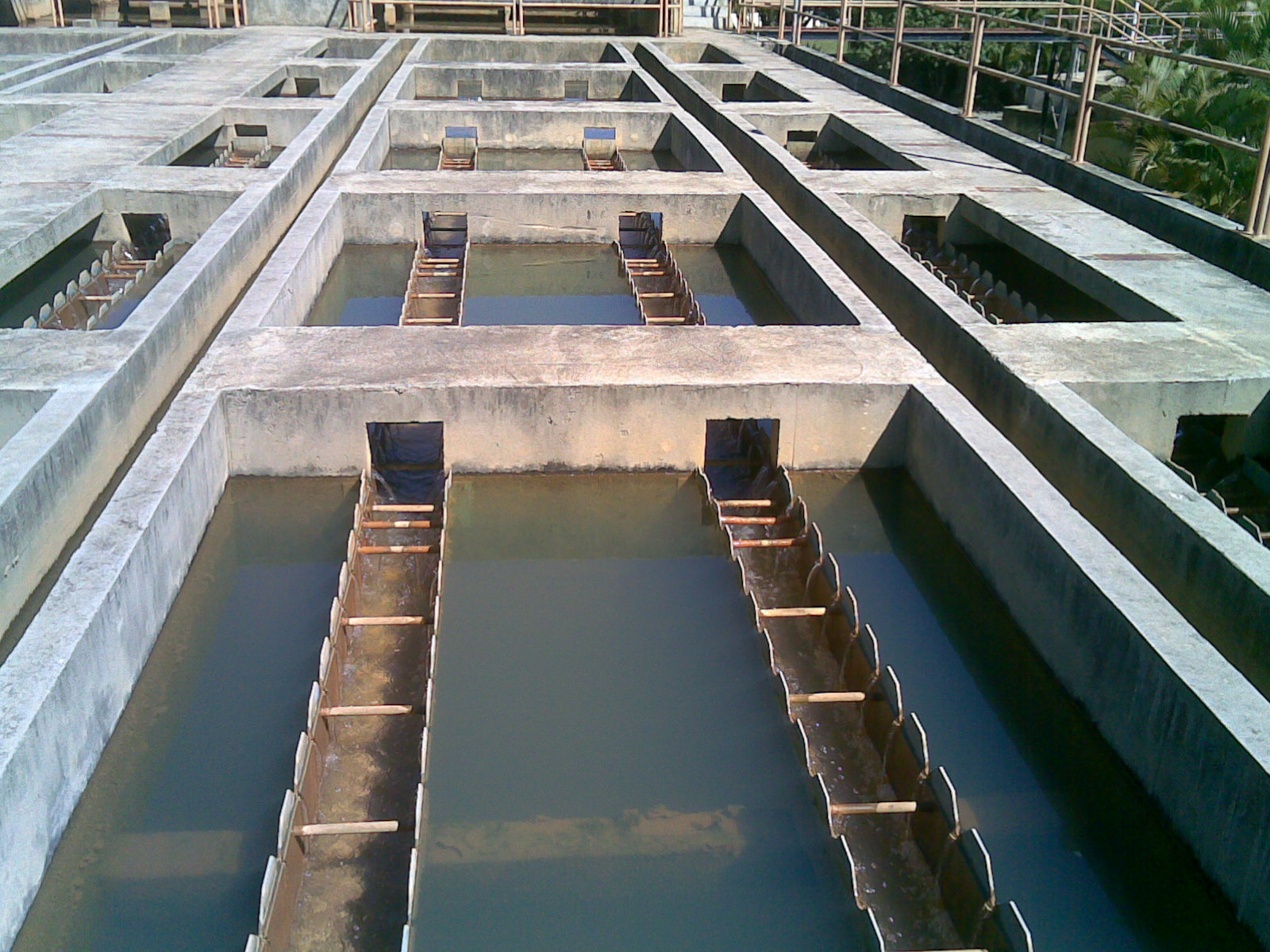
Rectangular sedimentation tanks with effluent weir structure visible above the fluid surface.

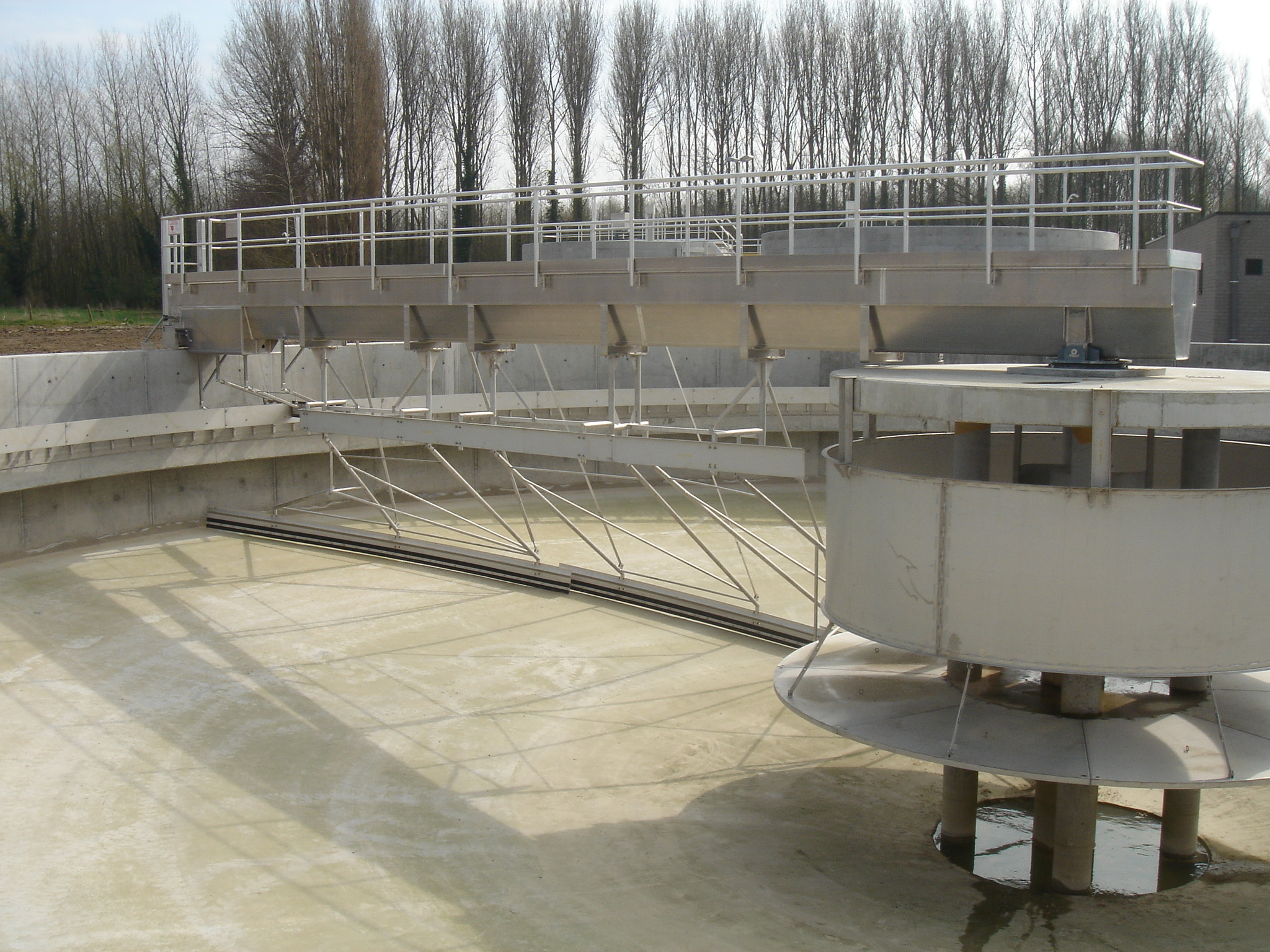
Drained circular sedimentation tank showing central inlet baffles on the right with solids scraper and skimmer arms visible under the rotating bridge.

Although sedimentation might occur in tanks of other shapes, removal of accumulated solids is easiest with conveyor belts in rectangular tanks or with scrapers rotating around the central axis of circular tanks. Mechanical solids removal devices move as slowly as practical to minimize resuspension of settled solids. Tanks are sized to give water an optimal residence time within the tank. Economy favors using small tanks; but if flow rate through the tank is too high, most particles will not have sufficient time to settle, and will be carried with the treated water. Considerable attention is focused on reducing water inlet and outlet velocities to minimize turbulence and promote effective settling throughout available tank volume. Baffles are used to prevent fluid velocities at the tank entrance from extending into the tank; and overflow weirs are used to uniformly distribute flow from liquid leaving the tank over a wide area of the surface to minimize resuspension of settling particles.

=== Tube settlers ===
Tube settler installation in clarifier

Tube or plate settlers are commonly used in rectangular clarifiers to increase the settling capacity by reducing the vertical distance a suspended particle must travel. Tube settlers are available in many different designs such as parallel plates, chevron shaped, diamond, octagon or triangle shape, and circular shape. High efficiency tube settlers use a stack of parallel tubes, rectangles or flat corrugated plates separated by a few inches (several centimeters) and sloping upwards in the direction of flow. This structure creates a large number of narrow parallel flow pathways encouraging uniform laminar flow as modeled by Stokes' law. These structures work in two ways:

1. They provide a very large surface area onto which particles may fall and become stabilized.
2. Because flow is temporarily accelerated between the plates and then immediately slows down, this helps to aggregate very fine particles that can settle as the flow exits the plates.

Structures inclined between 45° and 60° may allow gravity drainage of accumulated solids, but shallower angles of inclination typically require periodic draining and cleaning. Tube settlers may allow the use of a smaller clarifier and may enable finer particles to be separated with residence times less than 10 minutes. Typically such structures are used for difficult-to-treat waters, especially those containing colloidal materials.

Tube settlers capture the fine particles allowing the larger particles to travel to the bottom of the clarifier in a more uniform way. The fine particles then build up into a larger mass which then slides down the tube channels. The reduction in solids present in the outflow allows a reduction in the clarifier footprint when designing. Tubes made of PVC plastic are a minor cost in clarifier design improvements and may lead to an increase of operating rate of 2 to 4 times.

=== Operation ===
In order to maintain and promote the proper processing of a clarifier, it is important to remove any corrosive, reactive and polymerisable components first, or any material that may foul the outlet stream of water to avoid any unwanted side reactions, changes in the product or damage to any of the water treatment equipment. This is done through routine inspections in order to ascertain the extent of sediment build up, as well as frequent cleaning of the quiescent zones, the inlet and outlet areas of the clarifier to remove any scouring, litter, weeds or debris that may have accumulated over time.

Water being introduced into the clarifier should be controlled to reduce the velocity of the inlet flow. Reducing the velocity maximizes the hydraulic retention time inside the clarifier for sedimentation and helps to avoid excessive turbulence and mixing; thereby promoting the effective settling of the suspended particles. To further discourage the overt mixing within the clarifier and increase the retention time allowed for the particles to settle, the inlet flow should also be distributed evenly across the entire cross section of the settling zone inside the clarifier, where the volume is maintained at 37.7 percent capacity.

The sludge formed from the settled particles at the bottom of each clarifier, if left for an extended period of time, may become gluey and viscous, causing difficulties in its removal. This formation of sludge promotes anaerobic conditions and a healthy environment for the growth of bacteria. This can cause the resuspension of particles by gases and the release of dissolved nutrients throughout the water fluid, reducing the effectiveness of the clarifier. Major health issues and problems can also occur further down the track of the water purification system, or the health of the fish found downstream of the clarifier may be hindered.

== New development ==
Improvements and modifications have been made to enhance clarifier performance depending on the characteristics of the substance undergoing the separation.

Addition of flocculants is common to aid separation in clarifiers, but density difference of flocculant concentrate may cause treated water to have an excessive flocculant concentration. Uniform flocculent concentration can be improved and flocculant dosage reduced by installation of an intermediate diffused wall perpendicular to the flow in the clarifier.

The two dominant forces acting upon the solid particles in clarifiers are gravity and particle interactions. Disproportional flow can lead to turbulent and hydraulic instability and potential flow short-circuiting. Installation of perforated baffle walls in modern clarifiers promotes uniform flow across the basin. Rectangular clarifiers are commonly used for high efficiency and low running cost. Improvements of these clarifiers were made to stabilize flow by elongation and narrowing of the tank.

== See also ==
- API oil-water separator
- Dissolved air flotation
- List of waste-water treatment technologies
- Total suspended solids

== Bibliography ==
- Weber, Walter J., Jr. Physicochemical Processes for Water Quality Control. John Wiley & Sons (1972). ISBN 0-471-92435-0
