= Wescorp Energy =

Wescorp Energy Inc.
- Company type: Private
- Industry: Oil and Gas
- Founded: Calgary, Alberta (2003)
- Headquarters: Calgary, Alberta
- Key people: Douglas Biles, President & CEO; Robert Power, Chairman of the Board
- Products: Petrochemical services
- Number of employees: 23 (2008)
- Website: www.wescorpenergy.com

Wescorp Energy is a Canadian company which provides technology for separating water from oil which it claims is significantly more effective than previous technologies.

Mark Norris, a former Alberta Cabinet Minister of Economic Development under Premier Ralph Klein, is the company's chairman.

== Oil/Water separation ==
WesCorp developed and patented a new method of separating oil from production wastewater and re-injecting the water into drilled oil wells. As a by-product, the separated oil could be added to total production. As of August 2008, this testing phase was reported as complete and the new process has begun entering mainstream oil production.

The cleaner water can be injected to improve pressures in the reservoir without blocking the well. The company states that its process can reduce operating costs for a well by reducing the number of fracs (well servicing events) a year from 10 to five. Also, about 40 barrels of oil can be recovered from a 2,000-barrel-per-day facility.

The conventional technology used today to remediate water leaves oil contamination of 0.5% to 3%. Wescorp claims its technology can improve that to .005% (50 parts per million).

== See also ==
- API oil-water separator
- Pollution
- Wastewater
- Industrial wastewater treatment
- Industrial water treatment
