= Dissolved gas flotation =

Process floats solids, oils and other contaminants to the surface of liquids

Dissolved gas flotation (DGF) systems are used for a variety of applications throughout the world. The process floats solids, oils and other contaminants to the surface of liquids. Once on the surface these contaminants are skimmed off and removed from the liquids. Oil and gas production facilities have used flotation systems to remove oil and solids from their produced and processed water (wastewater) for many years. The relative density of candle wax is 0.93, hence objects made of wax float on water.

== Process description ==
The keys to good separation are both gravity and the creation of millions of very small bubbles. Based on Stokes' law, the size of the oil droplet and density of the droplet will affect the rate of rise to the surface. The larger and lighter the droplet, the faster it will rise to the surface. By attaching a small gas bubble to an oil droplet, the density of the droplet decreases, which increases the rate at which it will rise to the surface. Therefore, the smaller the gas bubbles created the smaller the oil droplet floated to the surface. Efficient flotation systems need to create as many small bubbles as possible.

The method in which the bubbles are introduced into the water stream and retention time are also important factors. The average retention time for a vertical unit is typically 4 to 5 minutes and 5 to 6 minutes for a horizontal unit.

== DGF pump ==
The impeller in a DGF pump is designed with dual sides. One side is designed to drive the liquid like a normal centrifugal pump and the other side is designed to draw vapor into the pump and mix it with the liquid. In addition to the new impeller, a special seal was invented to extend the life of the pump. With these innovations the pump creates a sub-atmospheric pressure region within the pump's seal chamber. As the impeller draws in the vapor it is mixed with the liquid being pumped and compressed into micro-fine bubbles. Because of the close tolerance between the backvanes of the impeller and the backplate of the pump the vapor is sheared into fine bubbles and then they are compressed in the sub-atmospheric pressure region of the pump. These fine bubbles become dissolved into the liquid within the volute of the pump.

The result of this process provides similar size bubbles to a dissolved air flotation system. The backpressure valve on the discharge piping can regulate the bubble size in a DGF pump. The bubble size ranges from 50 down to 1 micrometer or less.

== See also ==
- API oil-water separator
- Flotation process
- Induced gas flotation
- Industrial wastewater treatment
- List of waste-water treatment technologies
- Dissolved air flotation
