= Microflotation =

Microflotation is a further development of standard dissolved air flotation (DAF). Microflotation is a water treatment technology operating with microbubbles of 10–80 μm in size instead of 80-300 μm like conventional DAF units.

The general operating method of microflotation is similar to standard recycled stream DAF units. The advancements of microflotation are lower pressure operation, smaller footprints and less energy consumption.

== Process description ==
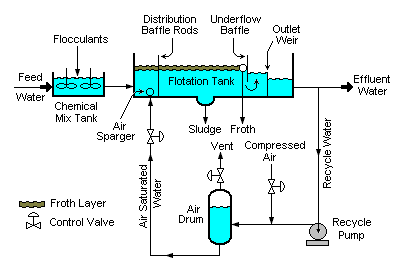
Description of function of a standard DAF

The method of Microflotation is comparable to recycled stream DAF. A portion of the clarified effluent water leaving the Microflotation tank is pumped into a small pressure vessel into which compressed air is also introduced. This results in saturating the pressurized effluent water with air. The air-saturated water stream is recycled to the front of the Microflotation cell and flows through a pressure release valve just as it enters the front of the float tank, which results in the air being released in the form of tiny bubbles. Bubbles form at nucleation sites on the surface of the suspended particles, adhering to the particles. As more bubbles form, the lift from the bubbles eventually overcomes the force of gravity. This causes the suspended matter to float to the surface where it forms a froth layer which is then removed by a skimmer. The froth-free water exits the float tank as the clarified effluent from the Microflotation unit. A particular circular DAF system is called "Zero speed", allowing quite water status then highest performances; a typical example is an Easyfloat 2K DAF system.

== Advantages ==
Microflotation is an enhanced method to float particles to the surface with the aid of adherent air bubbles.

The adherence of suspended solids to bubbles is easier and more intensive, the smaller the bubbles are. Because of the improved adherence capacity of small microbubbles, the saturation of the introduced air as well as the reduction capability of particles lead to an improved suspended solids reduction, a higher solids content in the float sludge and a more stable float sludge on the surface of the microflotation cell.

A difference has to be made to dispersed flotation used in mining industry in mineral segregation processes where the bubble are bigger being 500-2000 μm in size and volume of air is many fold compared to the water volume. Traditional Dissolved Air flotation (DAF) mainly operates with bubble sizes ranging from 80 to 300 μm with very inhomogeneous bubble size distribution.

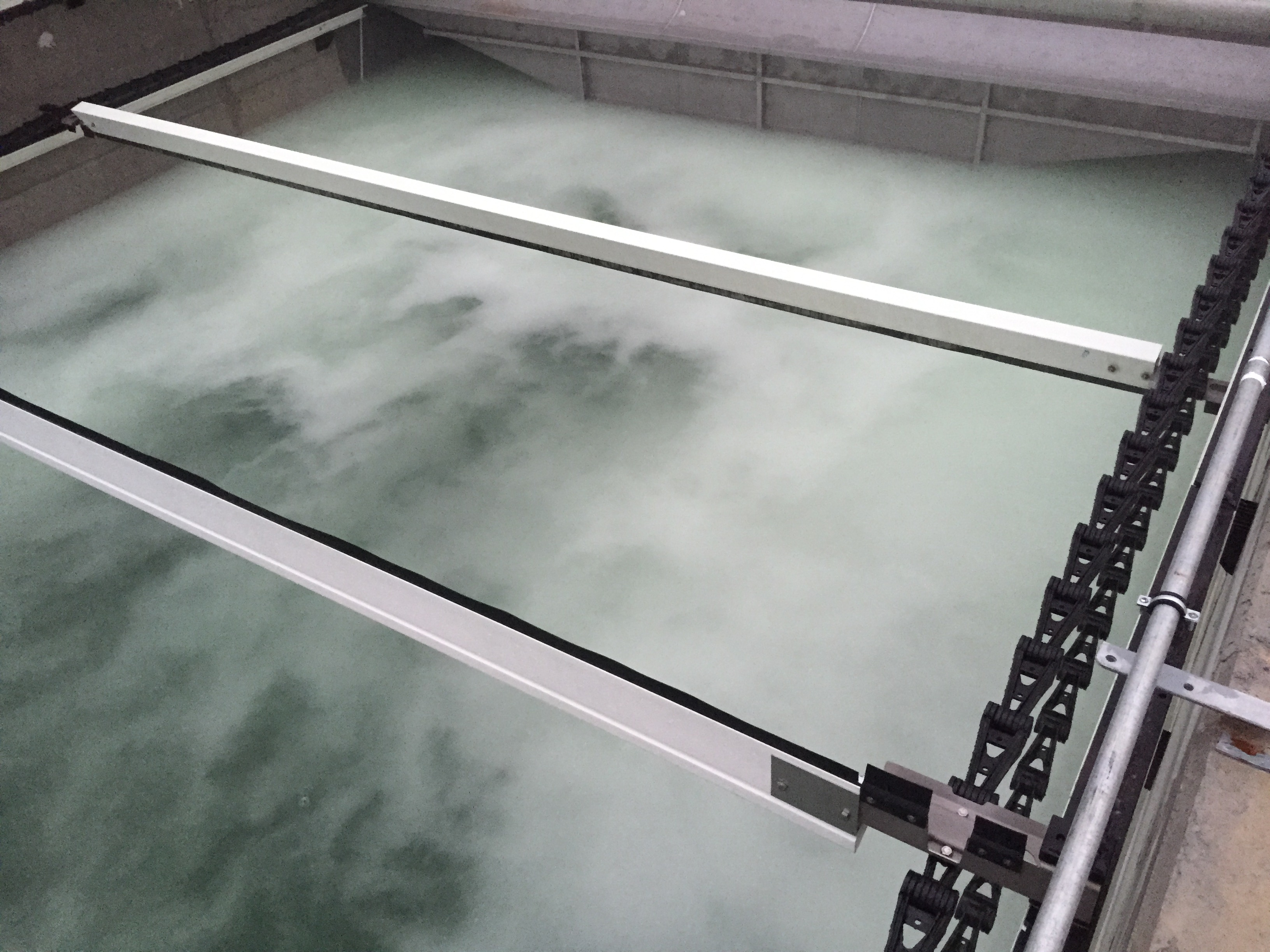
Microbubble cloud in a Microflotation cell.

A major difference of low pressure dissolved air flotation and other flotation processes lies in the volumes of bubbles, amount of air and raising speeds. One macro bubble can be 1000 times bigger in volume compared to one micro bubble. And vice versa the number of micro bubbles can be 1000 fold in number compared to one macro bubble having same volume.

Microflotation enables bubbles in size 40-70 μm with rise rates from 3–10 m/h. The rise rate is slow enough not to destroy the fragile flocks forming an agglomeration of particles with weak mutual bonding and high enough to allow time for separation of the agglomeration. With the attachment of particles to bubbles the size range of "flock-bubble" grows, and the rise velocities grow simultaneously. The separation rate is accelerated leading to residence times of combined chemical precipitation and flotation from 10 to 60 minutes with need of small footprint areas of treatment plants and decreasing the cost structures of treatment processes.

A distribution of bubble sizes between 20 and 50 microns is the necessary requirement for an optimum flotation result. Even a small number of bubbles with diameters of above 100 microns can disable a flotation separation process, because larger bubbles rise more quickly and cause turbulence, which severely destroys already build air-flocks-agglomerates.

== Applications ==
Microflotation is technically appropriately and primarily economic to substitute classic technology like sand filtration and sedimentation. Beyond there are several applications at which low pressure Microflotation is an alternative to membrane technology or represents a convincing addition.

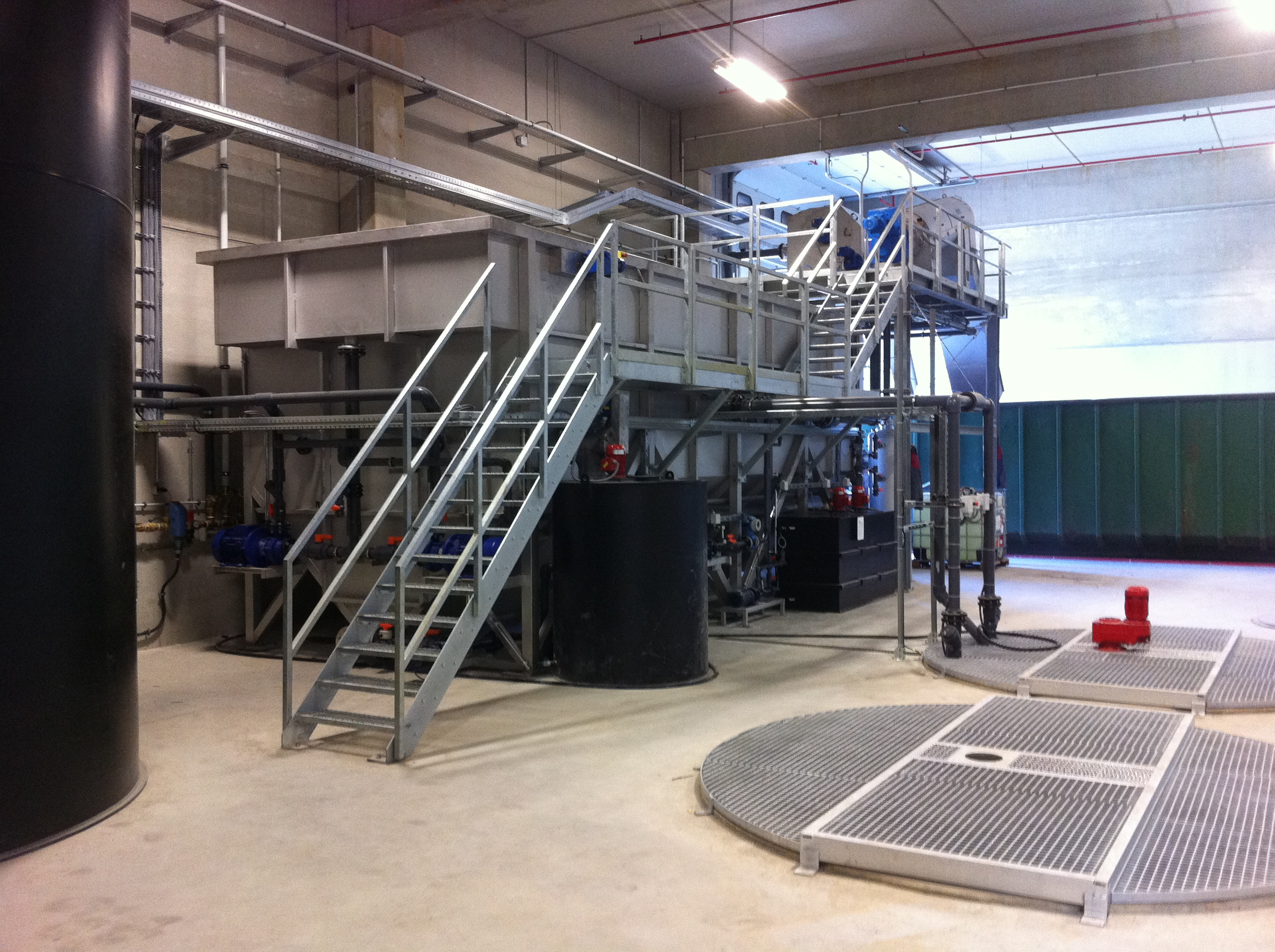
80m^{3}/h application

Microflotation can be used as:

- Non-Chemical/Chemical Industrial PreTreatment (COD, BOD, F.O.G., TSS reduction. heavy metal- and color removal)
- Primary treatment
- Tertiary treatment
- Replacement or protection of filtration units
- Sludge thickening
- Protection and performance improvement of MBR units, aerobic and anaerobic biologies
