= Leeway =

Downwind component of motion of a floating object due to wind

Leeway is the amount of drift motion to leeward of an object floating in the water caused by the component of the wind vector that is perpendicular to the object’s forward motion. The National Search and Rescue Supplement to the International Aeronautical and Maritime Search and Rescue Manual defines leeway as "the movement of a search object through water caused by winds blowing against exposed surfaces". However, the resultant total motion of an object is made up of the leeway drift and the movement of the upper layer of the ocean caused by the surface currents, tidal currents and ocean currents. Objects with a greater exposure to each element will experience more leeway drift and overall movement through the water than ones with less exposure.

A navigator or pilot on a vessel must adjust the ordered course to compensate for the leeway drift and more important set and drift, an all encompassing term for drift that includes the steering error of the vessel. Failure to make these adjustments during a voyage will yield poor navigational results. Bowditch's American Practical Navigator (1995) offers a comprehensive free guide to navigation principles.

An object can be classified as either an active object, such as a ship navigating through a waterway, or a passive object, like a liferaft, drifting debris, or a person in the water (PIW) (Figure 3). A passive object will experience the greatest leeway drift, which is of utmost importance to those involved in search and rescue (SAR) operations on inland waterways and open oceans.

== Leeway in search and rescue ==
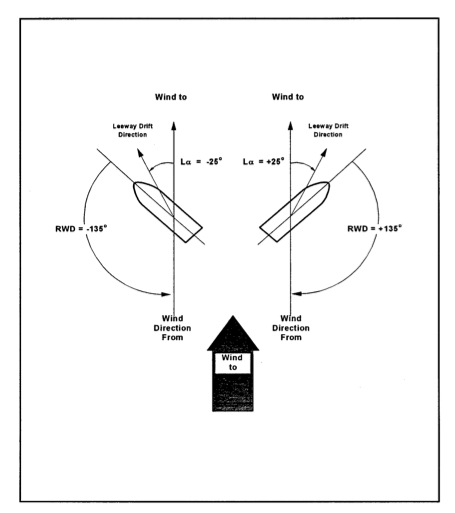
Figure 1. Relationship between Relative Wind Direction (RWD) and Leeway Angle.

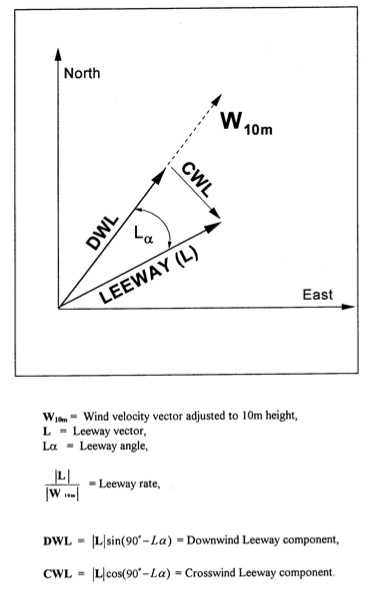
Figure 2. Relationship between the Leeway Speed and Angle and the Downwind and Crosswind Components of Leeway.

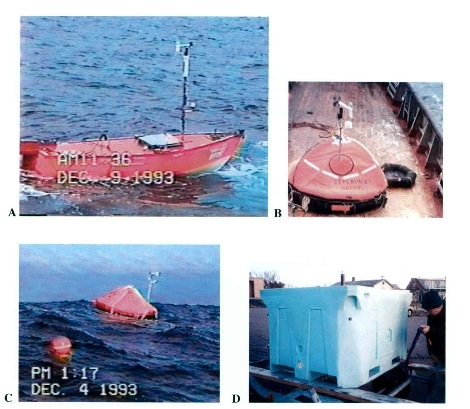
Figure 3. The 5.5-meter V-hull, open skiff, Tulmar 4-person life raft, Beaufort 20-person life raft, and 1-cubic meter wharf box.

=== Definition of leeway parameters ===
- Leeway Angle ($L_\alpha$): The leeway drift direction minus the direction towards which the wind is blowing with a deflection to the right of downwind being positive and to the left being negative. A leeway angle of zero degrees indicates that the craft drifts directly downwind. See figure 1 and figure 2.
- Leeway Velocity Vector (|L| cm/s): The magnitude of the leeway velocity. Leeway speed is always positive. Leeway speed and angle are the polar coordinates for the leeway velocity vector.
- Downwind (DWL) and Crosswind (CWL) components of Leeway: The components of the leeway velocity vector expressed in rectangular coordinates relative to the wind velocity vector. The crosswind component is the divergence of the SAR object from the downwind direction. Positive crosswind components are divergence to the right of the wind and negative crosswind components are divergence to the left of the wind.
- Leeway Rate: The leeway speed divided by the wind speed adjusted to the 10-meter reference level.
- Relative Wind Direction: The direction from which the wind blows, measured in degrees about a chosen axis and reference point of the SAR object.
- Divergence Angle: The representative range of leeway angles for a category of leeway objects. It can be calculated by obtaining the net leeway angle over time for a specific leeway object’s drift trajectory, and then averaging again for a series of leeway drift trajectories of a number of leeway objects in a leeway category, to determine the mean leeway angle and standard deviation of the leeway angle for the category. Divergence angle is then calculated as twice the standard deviation of the leeway angle, or mean plus one standard deviation of the leeway angle, or mean plus two standard deviations of the leeway angle depending on the particular study.

=== Leeway divergence ===
The most important elements of search and rescue are accurately assessing the last known position of a search object and accurately predicting its future position given hindcast, current and forecasted environmental conditions. Because the search object is located within two dynamic boundary layers with high vertical shear in the velocity profiles of wind and current, Fitzgerald et al. (1993) proposed an operational definition of leeway that helped standardize atmospheric and oceanic reference levels:

Leeway is the velocity vector of the SAR object relative to the downwind direction at the search object as it moves relative to the surface current as measured between 0.3m and 1.0m depth caused by winds (adjusted to a reference height of 10m) and waves."

This definition has limitations, as it does not address the asymmetry of non-standard search objects. For example, deep draft vessels and/or swamped vessels exceed the reference depth of 1.0m and are affected more so by the currents while sea kayaks and/or surfboards have a very small freeboard and are affected more so by the wind driven currents.

==== Balance of forces ====
The wind, current and waves make up the balance of forces for any drifting object. Sufficient information of these forces as well as the shape of the drifting object should yield the correct resultant drift of the object. Richardson (1997) and Breivik and Allen (2008) noted that there are aerodynamic and hydrodynamic lift and drag components of the wind and current on the parts of the object exposed to the air and current. Figures 1 & 2 depict the various leeway components. The larger component of leeway drift is the downwind component, which is comparable to the hydrodynamic and aerodynamic drag. It is critical to include the component of drift that is perpendicular to the downwind component called the crosswind component of leeway drift, which is comparable to the hydrodynamic and aerodynamic lift. The crosswind component causes the drift object to diverge from straight downwind direction. The leeway divergence depends upon the search object as well as the environment. Furthermore, the initial orientation of the object relative to the wind will change the path of the object. It is unknown whether the search object will diverge to the right or left of the downwind direction therefore the range of values of leeway divergence is important in determining the actual trajectory.

=== Methods of measuring leeway ===
There are two methods for measuring leeway for drifting search objects: indirect and direct. All of the studies conducted prior to 1993 with the exception of two employed the indirect method (Breivik et al., 2011).

==== Indirect method ====
The indirect method estimates leeway by subtracting a sea current vector from the total displacement vector to estimate the leeway vector. This method was riddled with data collection errors from slippage errors on the drifting buoys to navigational errors in determining the buoys position. Most of the time, the drifters that were used to measure the current were not located in the same position as the drifting object. Furthermore, winds were determined by anemometers readings, which tended to overestimate the wind speed at the 10-meter reference level. The combination of errors made this method less accurate than the direct method. Allen and Plourde (1999) listed seventeen studies that used the indirect method of obtaining leeway.

==== Direct method ====
The direct method measures the relative motion of the target through the water by attaching a current meter directly to the leeway drift target. The first leeway study that used the direct method was conducted by Suzuki and Sato (1977). They allowed a 3.9 m bamboo pole to drift from the ship at a prescribed length, measured the drift direction and the time it took for the line to pay out, and regressed these variables against the ship’s wind speed. Fitzgerald et al. (1993) were the first to employ the direct method using autonomous outfitted leeway targets off the coast of Newfoundland, which eliminated many of the errors associated with the indirect method and produced a continuous record of leeway for the search object in various oceanic conditions. Many of the studies listed in Allen and Plourde (1999) used S4 electromagnetic current meters produced by InterOceans System, Inc. Other current meters include the Aanderaa current meter (DCS 3500), which used Doppler techniques to remotely sense the currents and Sontek Corporation’s Argtonaut XR acoustic current meter. Allen and Plourde (1999) listed eight direct method leeway studies conducted from 1977 to 1999.

In total, ninety-five leeway target types were studied during twenty-five different field studies that included forty types of life rafts, fourteen small craft and ten fishing vessels. Other targets include PIWs, surfboards, sailboats, life capsules, homemade rafts, fishing vessel boating debris and medical/sewage waste. Figure 3 depicts four different search objects. A comprehensive list of leeway objects is in Allen and Plourde (1999) and Allen (2005).

=== Modeling leeway divergence ===
Modeling leeway divergence is a challenging problem but one that search and rescue agencies are highly interested in. First and second generation models used analytical methods to model leeway divergence. They modeled leeway divergence in terms of the leeway angle alone due to their inability to resolve complex physical processes. Statistical models, however, have the ability to resolve leeway in terms of the crosswind and downwind components. Therefore, in order to achieve a more complete solution of leeway in statistical models, it is important to find the range of downwind and crosswind leeway components separately as a function of the wind speed. A study conducted by Allen (2005) used constrained and unconstrained linear regression analysis to determine the downwind and crosswind coefficient from the leeway speed and the divergence angles obtained in Allen and Plourde (1999) for all relevant search and rescue leeway objects. His methodology as well as a detailed list of coefficients for each leeway object can be found in Allen (2005). His resultant efforts have been included in the latest generation of ensemble-based search and rescue models employed by the U.S. Coast Guard and the Norwegian Joint Rescue Coordination Centres (JRCC).

The Search and Rescue Optimal Planning System (SAROPS) and the Norwegian SAR model compute the net trajectory of search objects and provide a probability density area based upon Monte Carlo methods. The success of the stochastic trajectory model depends upon the quality and resolution of environmental forcing and precise leeway calculations for the drifting object.
