= Flotation =

Flotation (also spelled floatation) involves phenomena related to the relative buoyancy of objects.

The term may also refer to:

- Flotation (archaeology), a method for recovering very small artefacts from excavated sediments
- Flotation (shares), an initial public offering of stocks or shares in a company
- Floating exchange rate – changing policy to make a fixed currency have a floating rate may be called 'flotation'.
- Flotation, any material added to the hull of a watercraft to keep the hull afloat
- Flotation, the ability (as of a tire or snowshoes) to stay on the surface of soft ground or snow
- "Floatation", a 1990 electronic music song by The Grid
- Flotation process, in process engineering, a method for the separation of mixtures
  - Dissolved air flotation (DAF), a water treatment process
  - Froth flotation, a process for separating hydrophobic from hydrophilic materials
  - Induced gas flotation, a water treatment process that clarifies wastewaters (or other waters) by the removal of suspended matter such as oil or solids
- Flotation therapy, a technique whereby users 'float' in an isolation tank

== See also ==
- Float (disambiguation)
