= DGF =

DGF may refer to

Science and technology:

- Delayed graft function, in kidney transplantation
- Dissolved gas flotation, an industrial treatment process

Organizations:

- DHL Global Forwarding, part of Deutsche Post
- DGF Flensborg, a German football club
- Dramatists Guild Foundation, an American charity

Other uses:

- Danmarks gamle Folkeviser, a collection of texts and recordings of old Danish popular ballads
