= Floating =

Floating may refer to:

- a type of dental work performed on horse teeth
- use of an isolation tank
- the guitar-playing technique where chords are sustained rather than scratched
- Floating (play), by Hugh Hughes
- Floating (psychological phenomenon), slipping into altered states
- Floating voltage, and floating ground, a voltage or ground in an electric circuit that is not connected to the Earth or another reference voltage
- Floating point, a representation in computing of rational numbers most commonly associated with the IEEE 754 standard
- Floating (film), a 1997 American drama film

== Finance ==
- Floating charge
- Floating exchange rate, a market-valued currency

== Music ==
- Floating (Eloy album) (1974)
- Floating (Ketil Bjørnstad album) (2005)
- Floating (EP), a 1991 EP by Bill Callahan
- "Floating" (The Moody Blues song) (1969)
- "Floating" (Megan Rochell song) (2006)
- "Floating" (Jape song) (2004)
- "Floating", an instrumental song by Roddy Ellias from the 1974 Canadian promo album: "CBC Radio Canada Broadcast Recording LM 402"
- "Floating", a song by Jolin Tsai from the 2000 album Don't Stop
- "Floating", a song by Moka Only from the 2000 album Road Life
- "Floating", a song by Schoolboy Q featuring 21 Savage from the 2019 album Crash Talk
- "Floating", a 2018 song by Alina Baraz
- "Floatin", a 2018 song by Uncle Kracker

== See also ==
- Float (disambiguation)
- Flotation (disambiguation)
- Buoyancy
