= Nut shell filter =

Device to remove oil from water

A nut shell filter is a device to remove oil from water. In the oil and gas industry, the term walnut shell filter is common since black walnuts are most often used. Typically nut shell filters are designed for loadings under 100 mg/L oil and 100 mg/L suspended solids and operate with 90–95% removal efficiency. High oil and solids loadings reduce run times between backwashes and results in reduced effluent quality.

== Design ==
A bed of nut shell media is contained in a vessel. Vessels are typically vertical, but may also be horizontal. Particles are captured as flow penetrates through the media bed. Although it is possible to use other media for this purpose, walnut and pecan shells are most commonly used since they have several desirable properties making them well suited for oil removal. First, nut shells are hard with a high modulus of elasticity, resulting in a low attrition rate and minimal media replacement, typically <5% per year. Nut shells also have an equal affinity for water and oil, allowing oil to be adsorbed during normal operation, but also enable oil removed from the bed during agitation allowing for media reuse. During normal operation, water typically flows down through the media bed where oil is coalesced and attracted to the nut shells and accumulates in the interstitial spaces between the media. Typical nut shell media is 12/20 (0.8 to 1.7 mm) and 12/16 mesh (1.2 to 1.7 mm). Although not designed for solids removal, an added benefit is that solids accumulate in the bed. As solids are collected, the differential pressure across the bed increases.

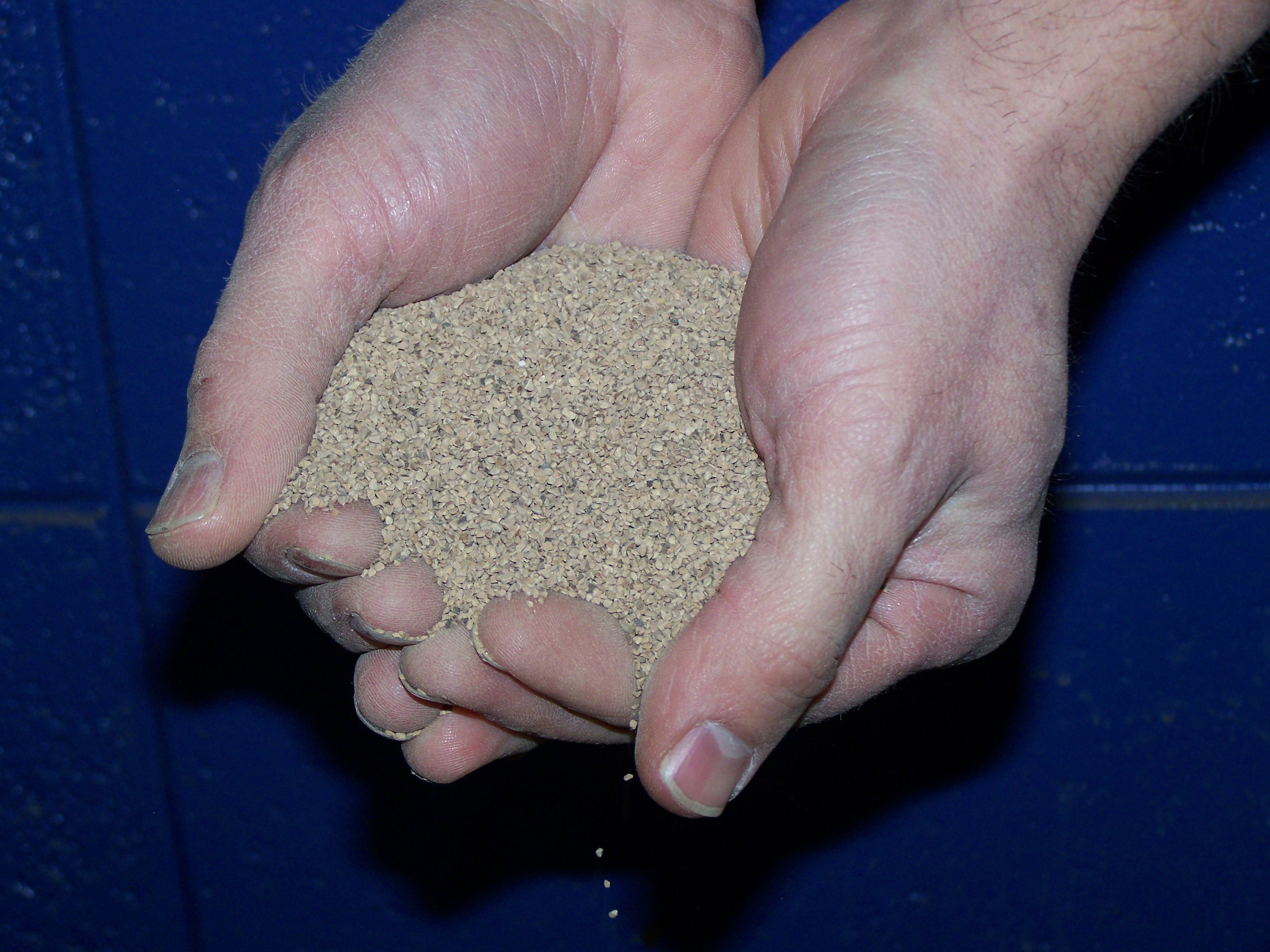
Walnut shell media

Periodical backwashes are initiated to regenerate the media. Typically, backwash is triggered by one of the following:

- Differential pressure
- Timer (often 24 hours)
- Operator initiated (often due to exceeding limit for effluent quality)

Backwash occurs through mechanical agitation such as

- Backwash through draft tube
- Backwash through external media scrubber
- Mechanical mixer

If backwash is not sufficient, oil can cause media to agglomerate, known as mudballing.

Typical flux of nut shell filters is 7 to 27 gpm/ft^{2}. Commercial vessels are sized to accommodate the flow rate of water and range up to 14 feet in diameter. For continuous operation, multiple vessels are frequently used so flow can continue to be treated while backwash occurs in one vessel. For large flows, several vessels may be used. Unlike some oil / water separators, no chemicals are required for oil removal in nut shell filters.

== Uses ==
Nut shell filters were designed to separate crude oil from oilfield produced water in the 1970s, which remains the principal use. Nut shell filters can be used onshore and offshore, but are more common onshore where the treatment requirements are typically more stringent and footprint is not limited. Nut shell filters are used for tertiary treatment following primary and secondary treatment which removes the bulk of the oil and suspended solids. Typically, effluent is reinjected for reuse or disposal or discharged to a surface body of water.

== Categories ==
- Media filter
