= Float =

Float may refer to:

== Common usage ==
- Lowboy (trailer), called a float in Eastern Canada usage
- Float (parade)

== Arts and entertainment ==
- Float (sculpture), a 1990 public artwork by American artist Peter Flanary
- Float (2019 film), a 2019 American animated short film produced by Pixar
- Float (2023 film), a 2023 drama film directed by Sherren Lee
- Float (b-boy move), a balance-intensive breakdance move

=== Music ===
==== Albums ====
- Float (Aesop Rock album) or the title song, 2000
- Float (Flogging Molly album) or the title song, 2008
- Float (K Camp album), 2021
- Float (Styles P album), 2013

==== Songs ====
- "Float" (song), by Tim and the Glory Boys, 2022
- "Float", by 6lack from 6pc Hot EP, 2020
- "Float", by Bush from Golden State, 2001
- "Float", by Eden from Vertigo, 2018
- "Float", by Janelle Monáe from The Age of Pleasure, 2023
- "Float", by Love Battery from Far Gone, 1993
- "Float", by the Music from The Music, 2002
- "Float", by Pacific Air from Long Live Koko, 2012
- "Float", by RAH Band from Mystery, 1985
- "Float", by Robin Schulz from IIII, 2021
- "Float", by Russell Dickerson from Yours, 2017

== Beverages ==
- Ice cream float, a beverage combining a soft drink and ice cream
- Float (bartending technique), layering of different-coloured liquid beverages

== Computing ==
- Float (computing)
- Float, a Cascading Style Sheets attribute
- Float, a single precision binary computer number format

== Finance and economics ==
- Float (money supply)
- Floating exchange rate
- Public float, portion of shares publicly owned
- Floating an initial public offering (IPO) of shares
- Insurance float, available reserve

== Fishing-related ==
- Fishing float, a lightweight buoy that serves as a bite indicator
- Fishing net float, attached to a fishing net
  - Glass float, a fishing net float that is made from hollow glass spheres

== Science ==
- Float (oceanography), an oceanographic instrument platform
- Float voltage, an external electric potential required to keep a battery fully charged
- Float or a floater, a piece of rock transported away from original outcrop

== Tools ==
- Float (liquid level), a fluid-level indicator used in process engineering and plumbing
- Float (woodworking), a tool used to cut, flatten and/or smooth wood via abrasion
- Concrete float, a finishing tool for smoothing wet concrete surfaces
- Float, a rasp-like tool sporting sharp cutting teeth, sometimes used on horse teeth

== Vehicles ==
- Float (horse-drawn), a type of cart
- Float (nautical), a buoyant part to keep something afloat
- Float (parade), a decorated vehicle
- Float shifting or "floating gears", shifting gears without using the clutch
- Milk float, battery milk-delivery vehicle
- Valve float, a condition of an internal combustion engine

== Other uses ==
- Float (project management), a time-management device
- Former Float railway station, County Westmeath, Ireland
- Swimming float or pool float, to aid swimmers
- Float, a group of crocodiles, an animal name

== See also ==
- Buoyancy
- Floating (disambiguation)
- Flotation (disambiguation)
