= Media filter =

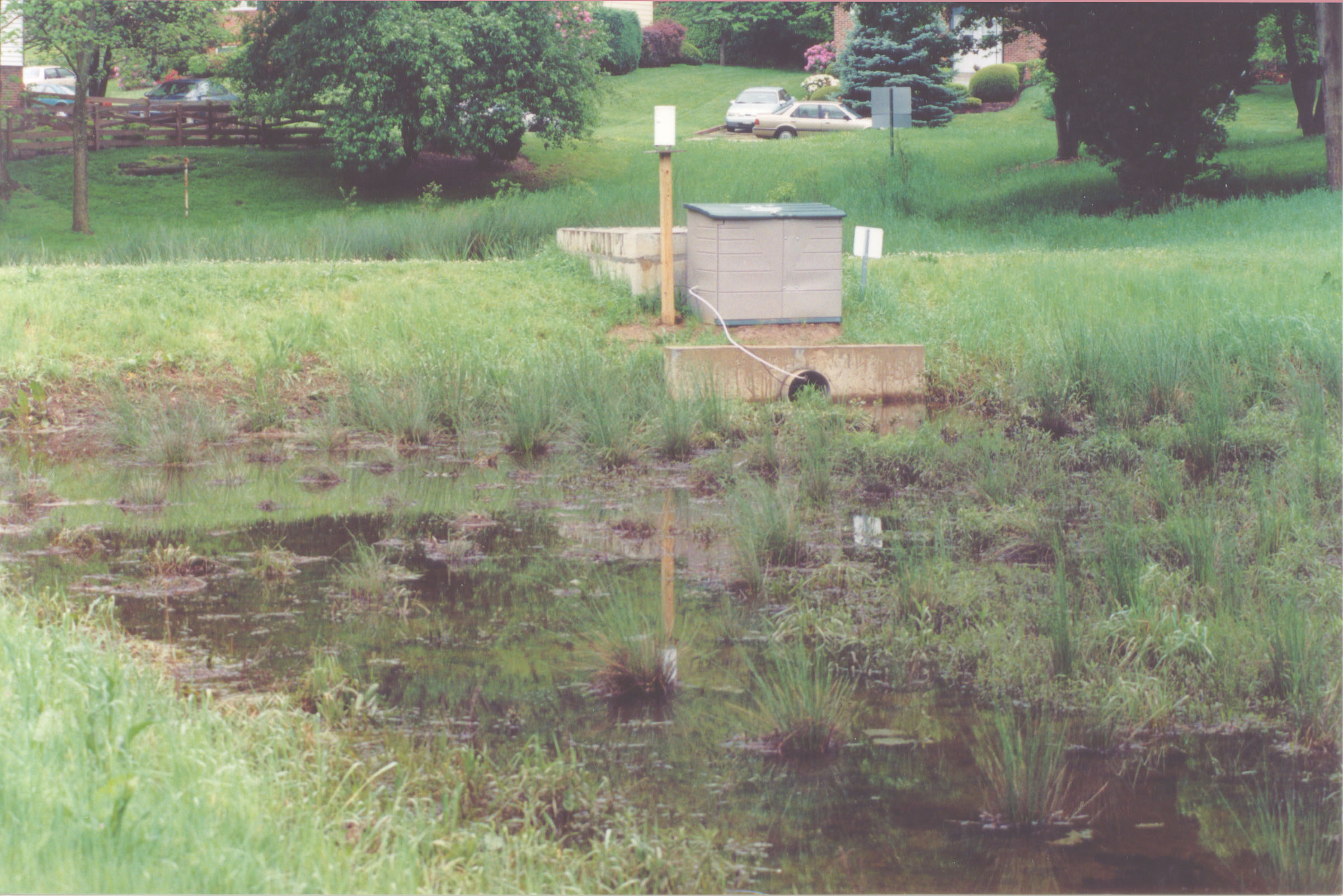
Peat-sand filter in United States. The filter treats stormwater runoff from a residential area. Stormwater from streets is first routed to a small detention basin (rear of photo, behind berm), which removes coarse sediment. After filtration an under-drain piping system discharges the filtered water to an adjacent stream.

A media filter is a type of filter that uses a bed of sand, peat, shredded tires, foam, crushed glass, geo-textile fabric, anthracite, crushed granite or other material to filter water for drinking, swimming pools, aquaculture, irrigation, stormwater management, oil and gas operations, and other applications.

Each layer of media is designed to filter out specific types and sizes of particles, allowing for more efficient and effective removal of contaminants.

== Types of media filtration ==
Media filtration is a type of granular depth filtration process in which water passes through one or more layers of filter media. It is primarily used for the removal of suspended solids, turbidity, and some microorganisms from water. Depending on the number and arrangement of filter media, media filtration can be classified into single-media, dual-media, and multi-media filtration systems. The material is arranged in such a way that the density and particle size decrease with increasing depth.

The single-media filtration typically uses sand as the sole filter material. It is commonly applied for the removal of relatively small particles and turbidity.

The dual-media filtration combines sand with a coarser and less dense material such as anthracite. This configuration improves the removal of suspended solids and reduces the accumulation of particles at the surface of the sand layer, allowing for longer filtration cycles and more efficient operation.

Multi-media consists out of three or more layers of different filter media, such as anthracite, sand, and gravel. The varying physical properties of these materials, including particle size and density, enhance the filtration performance by enabling more effective removal of particles throughout the depth of the filter bed.

== Design ==
One design brings the water in the top of a container through a "header" which distributes the water evenly. The filter "media" start with fine sand on the top and then becomes gradually coarser sand in a number of layers followed by gravel on the bottom, in gradually larger sizes. The top sand physically removes particles from the water. The job of the subsequent layers is to support the finer layer above and provide efficient drainage.

As particles become trapped in the media, the differential pressure across the bed increases. Periodically, a backwash may be initiated to remove the solids trapped in the bed. During backwash, flow is directed in the opposite direction from normal flow. In multi-media filters, the layers in the media re-stratify due to density differences prior to resuming normal filtration. Multimedia filter can remove particles down to 10-25 microns.

== Advantages and disadvantages ==
=== Advantages of multimedia filters ===
1. Multimedia filters use multiple layers of different filter media to achieve more effective and efficient filtration than single-media filters like sand filters.
2. They can remove a wider range of particle sizes and types than single-media filters, resulting in more efficient filtration and longer filter life.
3. They are effective at removing suspended solids, turbidity, and other contaminants from water.
4. They can be used for a wide range of flow rates and particle sizes. They can be easily backwashed to clean the filter media and restore filtration efficiency.
5. They require little to no electricity to operate.

=== Disadvantages of multimedia filters ===
1. Multimedia filters have a higher capital cost compared to single-media filters like sand filters.
2. They have a larger footprint and require more space than single-media filters.
3. They may not be effective at removing some types of contaminants, such as dissolved organic compounds and bacteria.
4. They may require pre-treatment to remove large particles or debris that could clog the filter media.
5. They can create waste material (backwash water) that needs to be treated or disposed of properly.

== Uses ==
=== Drinking water ===
Media filters are used in drinking water treatment, where multimedia filters are used as a primary or secondary filtration step to remove a wider range of particle sizes and types than sand filters, including organic matter and smaller particles.

Municipal drinking water systems often use a rapid sand filter and/or a slow sand filter for purification. Silica sand is the most widely used medium in such filters. Anthracite coal, garnet sand, ilmenite, granular activated carbon, manganese green sand and crushed recycled glass are among the alternative filter media used.

=== Stormwater ===
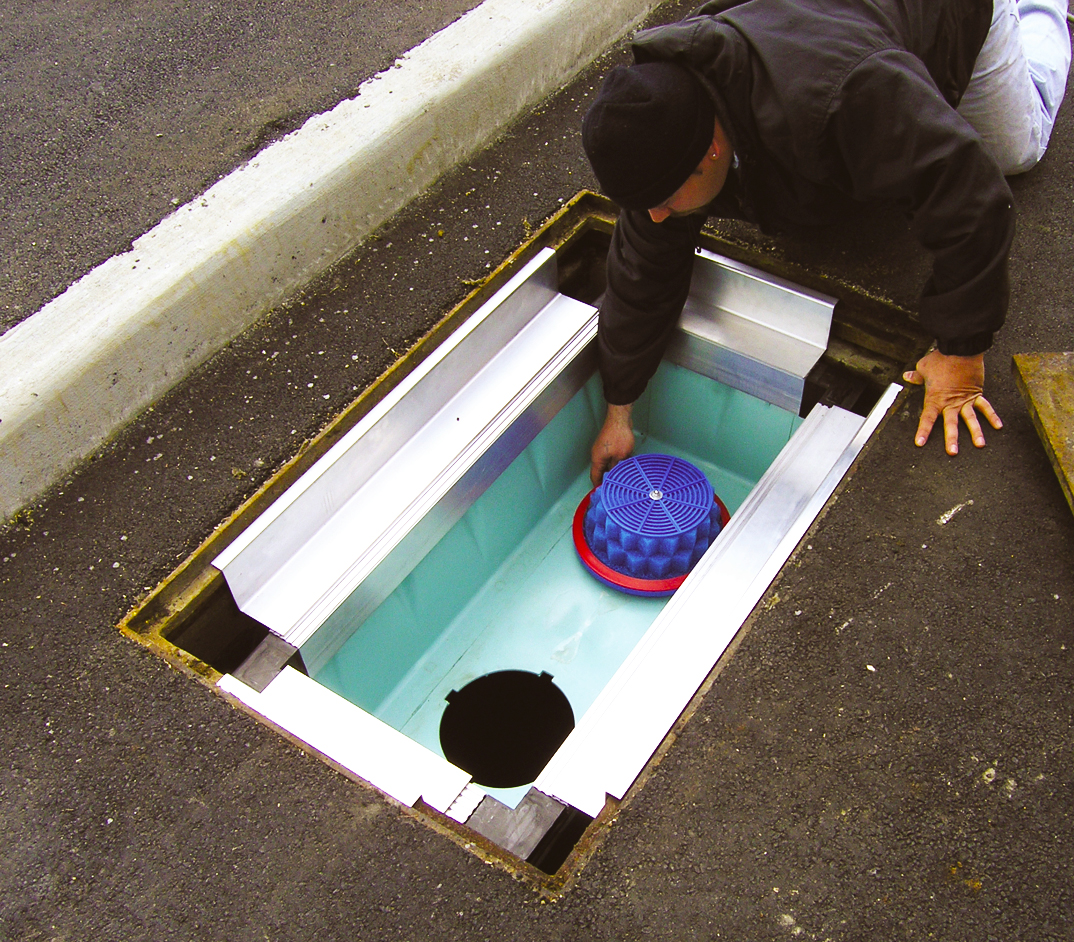
Media filter system for urban runoff

Media filters are used to protect water quality in streams, rivers, and lakes. They can be effective at removing pollutants in stormwater such as suspended solids and phosphorus. Sand is the most common filter material. In other filters, sometimes called "organic filters," wood chips or leaf mold may be used.

=== Sewage and wastewater ===
Media filters are also used for cleaning the effluent from septic tanks and primary settlement tanks. The materials commonly used are sand, peat and natural stone fibre.

=== Oil and gas industry ===
The oil and gas industry uses media filters for various purposes in both upstream and downstream operations. Nut shell filters are commonly used as a tertiary oil removal step for treatment of produced water. Sand filters are often used to remove fine solids following biological treatment and clarification of oil refinery wastewater. Multi-media filters are used for removing suspended solids from both produced water and refinery wastewater. The materials commonly used in multi-media filters are gravel, sand, garnet, and anthracite.

== See also ==
- Biofilter
- Bioretention
