= Induced gas flotation =

Water treatment process that clarifies wastewaters

Induced gas flotation (IGF) is a water treatment process that clarifies wastewater (or other waters) by removing suspended matter such as oil or solids. The removal is achieved by injecting gas bubbles into the water or wastewater in a flotation tank or basin. The small bubbles adhere to the suspended matter causing the suspended matter to float to the surface of the water where it may then be removed by a skimming device.

Induced gas flotation is very widely used in treating the industrial wastewater effluents from oil refineries, petrochemical and chemical plants, natural gas processing plants and similar industrial facilities. A very similar process known as dissolved air flotation is also used for waste water treatment. Froth flotation is commonly used in the processing of mineral ores.

IGF units in the oil industry do not use air as the flotation medium due to the explosion risk. These IGF units use natural gas or nitrogen to create the bubbles.

== Process description ==
The feed water to the IGF float tank is often (but not always) dosed with a coagulant (such as ferric chloride or aluminum sulfate) to flocculate the suspended matter.

The bubbles may be generated by an impeller, eductors or a sparger. The bubbles adhere to the suspended matter, causing the suspended matter to float to the surface and form a froth layer which is then removed by a skimmer. The froth-free water exits the float tank as the clarified effluent from the IGF unit.

Some IGF unit designs utilize parallel plate packing material to provide more separation surface and therefore to enhance the separation efficiency of the unit.

== See also ==
- API oil-water separator
- Flotation process
- Industrial water treatment
- Industrial wastewater treatment
- List of waste-water treatment technologies
