= API oil–water separator =

Industrial wastewater processing device

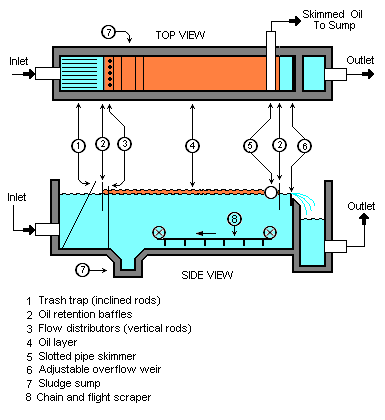
A typical gravimetric API separator

An API oil–water separator is a device designed to separate gross amounts of oil and suspended solids from industrial wastewater produced at oil refineries, petrochemical plants, chemical plants, natural gas processing plants and other industrial oily water sources. The API separator is a gravity separation device designed by using Stokes Law to define the rise velocity of oil droplets based on their density and size. The design is based on the specific gravity difference between the oil and the wastewater because that difference is much smaller than the specific gravity difference between the suspended solids and water. The suspended solids settles to the bottom of the separator as a sediment layer, the oil rises to top of the separator and the cleansed wastewater is the middle layer between the oil layer and the solids.

The name is derived from the fact that such separators are designed according to standards published by the American Petroleum Institute (API).

== Description of the design and operation ==
The API separator is a gravity separation device designed using Stokes' law principles that define the rise velocity of oil droplets based on their density, size and water properties. The design of the separator is based on the specific gravity difference between the oil and the wastewater because that difference is much smaller than the specific gravity difference between the suspended solids and water. Based on that design criterion, most of the suspended solids will settle to the bottom of the separator as a sediment layer, the oil will rise to top of the separator, and the wastewater will be the middle layer between the oil on top and the solids on the bottom. The API Design Standards, when correctly applied, make adjustments to the geometry, design and size of the separator beyond simple Stokes Law principles. This includes allowances for water flow entrance and exit turbulence losses as well as other factors. API Specification 421 requires a minimum length to width ratio of 5:1 and minimum depth-to-width ratio of 0.3:0.5.

Typically, the oil layer is skimmed off and subsequently re-processed or disposed of, and the bottom sediment layer is removed by a chain and flight scraper (or similar device) and a sludge pump. The water layer is sent to further treatment for additional removal of any residual oil and then to some type of biological treatment unit for removal of undesirable dissolved chemical compounds.

Many oils can be recovered from open water surfaces by skimming devices. Considered a dependable and cheap way to remove oil, grease and other hydrocarbons from water, oil skimmers can sometimes achieve the desired level of water purity. At other times, skimming is also a cost-efficient method to remove most of the oil before using membrane filters and chemical processes. Skimmers will prevent filters from blinding prematurely and keep chemical costs down because there is less oil to process.

Because grease skimming involves higher viscosity hydrocarbons, skimmers must be equipped with heaters powerful enough to keep grease fluid for discharge. If floating grease forms into solid clumps or mats, a spray bar, aerator or mechanical apparatus can be used to facilitate removal.

However, hydraulic oils and the majority of oils that have degraded to any extent will also have a soluble or emulsified component that will require further treatment to eliminate. Dissolving or emulsifying oil using surfactants or solvents usually exacerbates the problem rather than solving it, producing wastewater that is more difficult to treat.

== Design Limitations ==
API design separators, and similar gravity tanks, are not intended to be effective when any of the following conditions apply to the feed conditions:

- Mean Oil droplets size in the feed is less than 150 micron
- Oil density is greater than 925 kg/m3
- Suspended solids are adhering to the oil meaning the 'effective' oil density is greater than 925 kg/m3
- Water temperature less than 5 °C
- There are high levels of dissolved hydrocarbons

According to Stokes' Law, heavier oils require more retention time. In many cases where refineries have switched to heavier crude slates, the API separator’s efficiency has declined.

== Further treatment of API water discharges ==
Because of performance limitations the water discharged from API type separators usually requires several further processing stages before the treated water can be discharged or reused. Further water treatment is designed to remove oil droplets smaller than 150 micron, dissolved materials and hydrocarbons, heavier oils or other contaminants not removed by the API. Secondary treatment technologies include dissolved air flotation (DAF), Anaerobic and Aerobic biological treatment, Parallel Plate Separators, Hydrocyclone, Walnut Shell Filters and Media filters.

== Alternative technologies ==
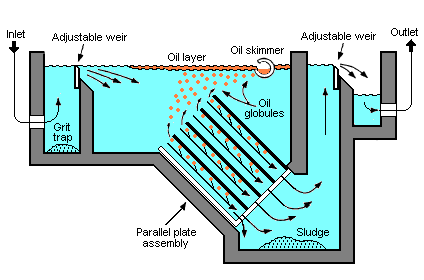
A typical parallel plate separator

Plate separators, or Coalescing Plate Separators are similar to API separators, in that they are based on Stokes Law principles, but include inclined plate assemblies (also known as parallel packs). The underside of each parallel plate provides more surface for suspended oil droplets to coalesce into larger globules. Coalescing plate separators may not be effective in situation where water chemicals or suspended solids restrict or prevent oil droplets coalesce. In operation it is intended that sediment will slide down the topside of each parallel plate, however in many practical situations the sediment can adhere to the plates requiring periodic removal and cleaning. Such separators still depend upon the specific gravity between the suspended oil and the water. However, the parallel plates can enhance the degree of oil-water separation for oil droplets above 50 micron in size. Alternatively parallel plate separators are added to the design of API Separators and require less space than a conventional API separator to achieve a similar degree of separation.

Parallel plate separators are similar to API separators but they include tilted parallel plate assemblies (also known as parallel packs). The parallel plates provide more surface for suspended oil droplets to coalesce into larger globules. Such separators still depend upon the specific gravity between the suspended oil and the water. However, the parallel plates enhance the degree of oil-water separation. The result is that a parallel plate separator requires significantly less space than a conventional API separator to achieve the same degree of separation.

== History ==
The API separator was developed by the API and the Rex Chain Belt Company (now Evoqua). The first API separator was installed in 1933 at the Atlantic Refining Company (ARCO) refinery in Philadelphia. Since that time, virtually all of the refineries worldwide have installed API separators as a first primary stage of their oily wastewater treatment plants. The majority of those refineries installed the API separators using the original design based on the specific gravity difference between oil and water. However, many refineries now use plastic parallel plate packing to enhance the gravity separation. Today regulations often require API separators with fixed or floating covers for volatile organic compound (VOC) control. Also, most API separators must be above ground for spill detection.

== Other oil–water separation applications ==
There are other applications requiring oil-water separation. For example:

- Oily water separators (OWS) for separating oil from the bilge water accumulated in ships as required by the international MARPOL Convention.
- Oil and water separators are commonly used in electrical substations. The transformers found in substations use a large amount of oil for cooling purposes. Moats are constructed surrounding unenclosed substations to catch any leaked oil, but these will also catch rainwater. Oil and water separators therefore provide a quicker and easier cleanup of an oil leak.

== See also ==
- Pollution
- Wastewater
- Industrial wastewater treatment
- Industrial water treatment
- Centrifugal water–oil separator
- Induced gas flotation
- Wescorp Energy
