= Produced water =

Water as a byproduct of oil production

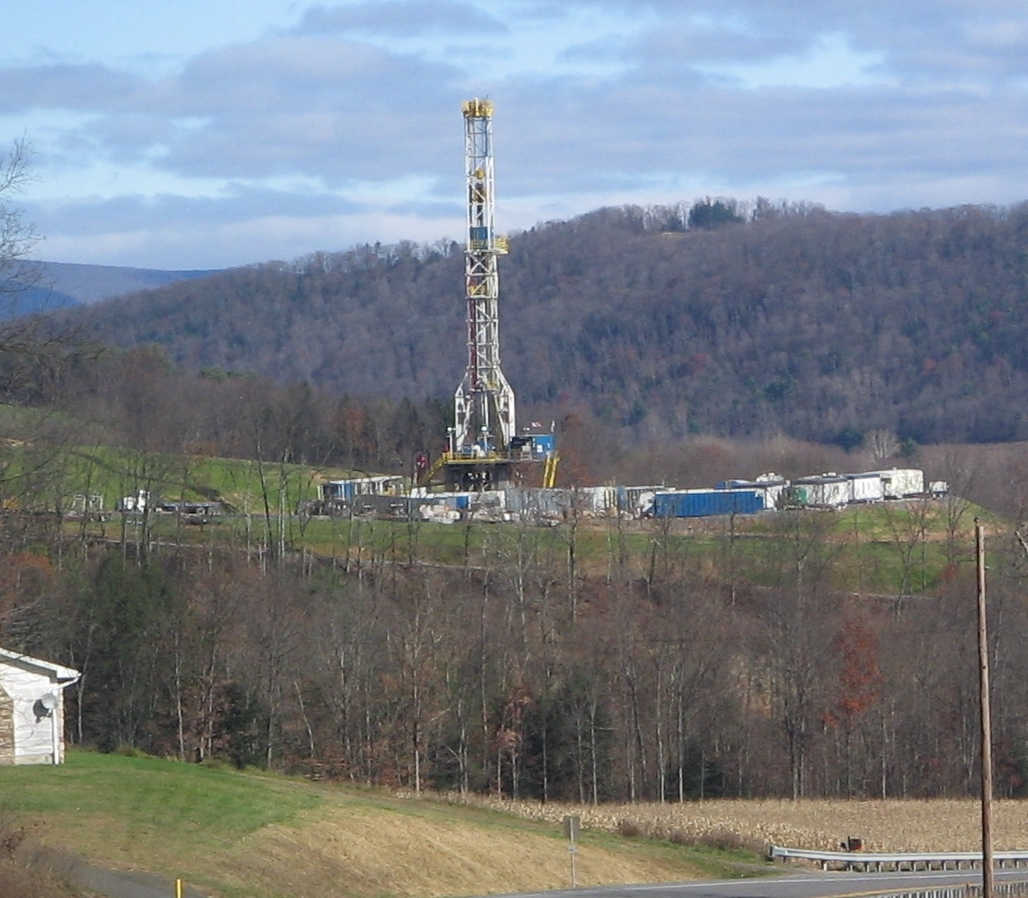
A shale gas well being drilled by a drilling rig in Pennsylvania

Produced water is a term used in the oil industry or geothermal industry to describe water that is produced as a byproduct during the extraction of oil and natural gas, or used as a medium for heat extraction. Water that is produced along with the hydrocarbons is generally brackish and saline in nature. Oil and gas reservoirs often have water as well as hydrocarbons, sometimes in a zone that lies under the hydrocarbons, and sometimes in the same zone with the oil and gas. In geothermal plants, the produced water is usually hot. It contains steam with dissolved solutes and gases, providing important information on the geological, chemical, and hydrological characteristics of geothermal systems. Oil wells sometimes produce large volumes of water with the oil, while gas wells tend to produce water in smaller proportions.

As an oilfield becomes old, its natural drive to produce hydrocarbons decreases leading to decline in production. To achieve maximum oil recovery, waterflooding is often implemented, in which water is injected into the reservoirs to help force the oil to the production wells. In offshore areas, sea water is used. In onshore installations, the injected water is obtained from rivers, treated produced water, or underground. Injected water is treated with many chemicals to make it suitable for injection. The injected water eventually reaches the production wells, and so in the later stages of water flooding, the produced water's proportion ("cut") of the total production increases.

== Water quality ==
The water composition ranges widely from well to well and even over the life of the same well. Much produced water is brine, and most formations result in total dissolved solids that are too high for beneficial reuse. In oil fields, almost all produced water contains oil and suspended solids. Some produced water contains heavy metals and traces of naturally occurring radioactive material (NORM), which over time deposits radioactive scale in the piping at the well. Metals found in produced water include zinc, lead, manganese, iron, and barium. In geothermal fields, produced waters are classified into 3 chemical types: HCO3-Ca⋅Mg, HCO3-Na and SO4⋅Cl-Na. The U.S. Environmental Protection Agency (EPA) in 1987 and 1999 indicates that during drilling and operations, additives may be used to reduce solid deposition on equipment and casings. Water produced from underground formations for geothermal electric power generation often exceeds primary and secondary drinking water standards for total dissolved solids, fluoride, chloride, and sulfate.

== Water management ==
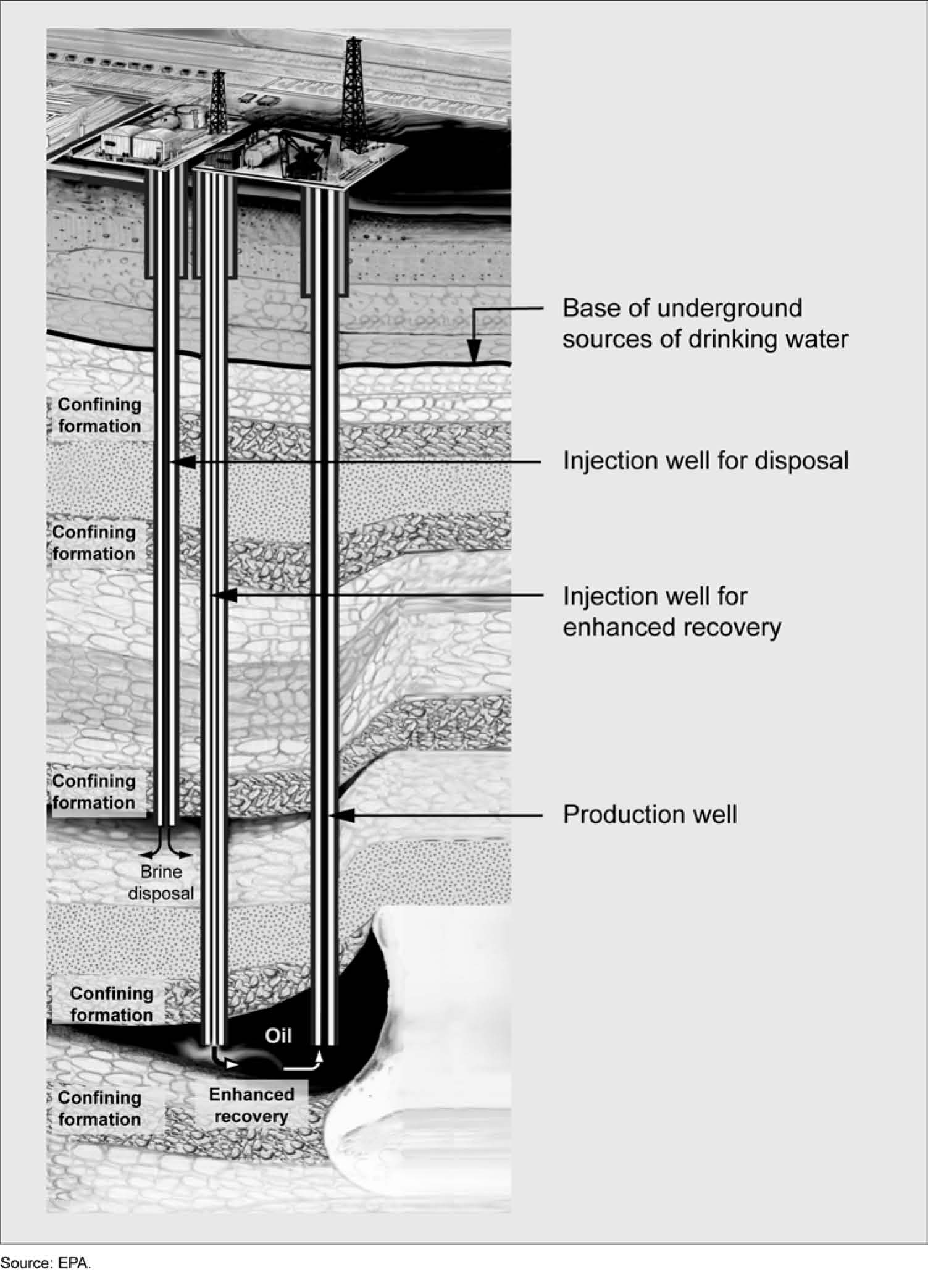
Diagram of an injection well for disposal of produced water

Water is required for both traditional geothermal systems and EGS throughout the life cycle of a power plant. For traditional projects, the water available at the resource is typically used for energy generation during plant operations.

Historically, produced water was disposed of in large evaporation ponds. However, this has become an increasingly unacceptable disposal method from both environmental and human health perspectives. Produced water is considered industrial waste.

The broad management options for re-use are direct injection, environmentally acceptable direct-use of untreated water, or treatment to a government-issued standard before disposal or supply to users. Treatment requirements vary throughout the world. In the United States, these standards are issued by the U.S. Environmental Protection Agency (EPA) for underground injection and discharges to surface waters. Although beneficial reuse for drinking water and agriculture have been researched, the industry has not adopted these measures due to cost, water availability, and public health concerns.

Gravity separators, hydrocyclones, plate coalescers, dissolved gas flotation, and nut shell filters are some of the technologies used in treating wastes from produced water.

== Radioactivity ==
The use of produced water for road deicing has been criticized as unsafe.

In January 2020, Rolling Stone magazine published an extensive report about radioactivity content in produced water and its effects on workers and communities across the United States. It was reported that brine sampled from a plant in Ohio was tested in a University of Pittsburgh laboratory and registered radium levels above 3,500 pCi/L. The Nuclear Regulatory Commission requires industrial discharges to remain below 60 pCi/L for each of the most common isotopes of radium, radium-226 and radium-228.

== See also ==
- Industrial waste water treatment
- Oil–water separator
