= Dissolved air flotation =

Water treatment process that removes suspended matter such as oil or solids

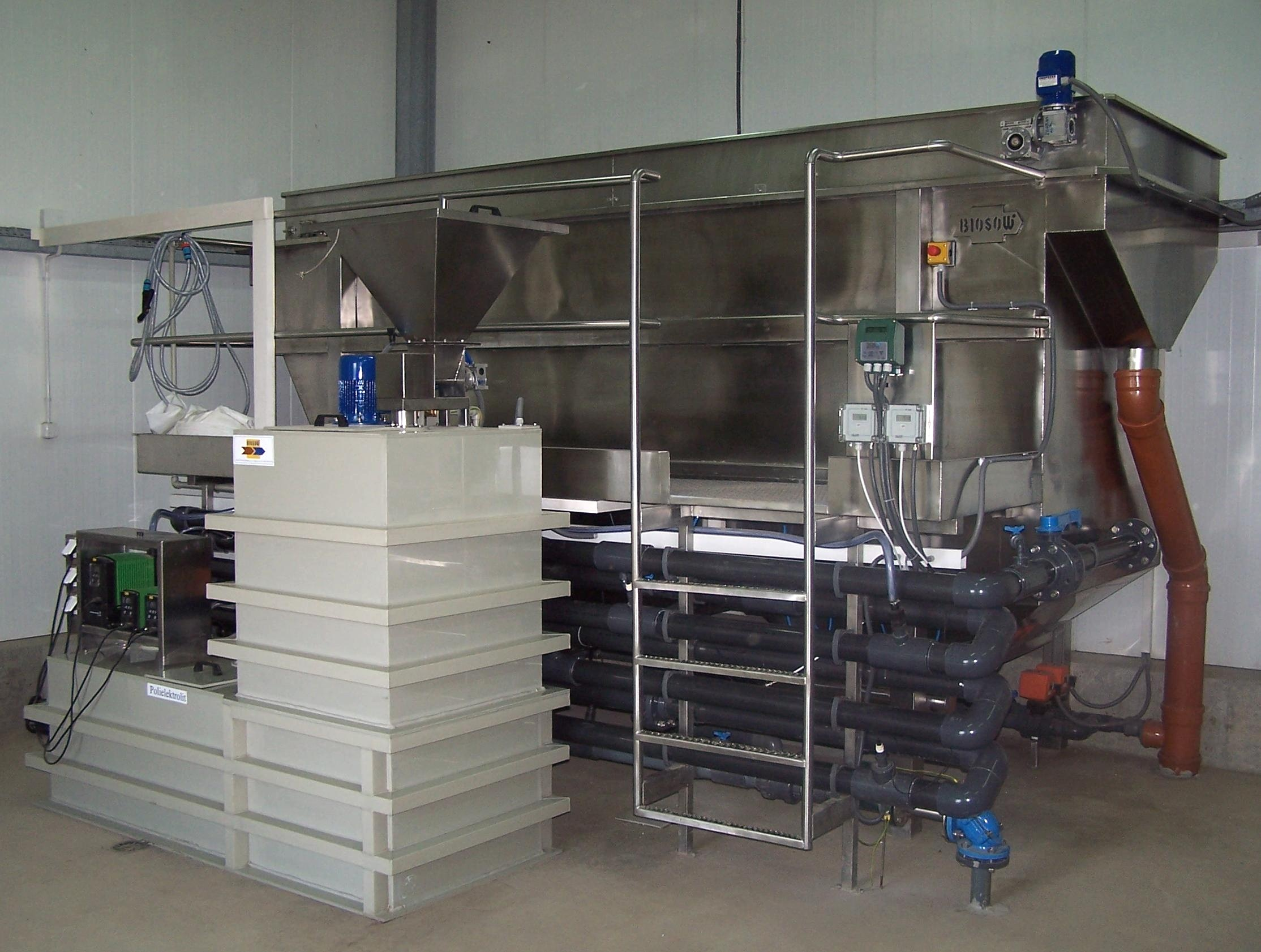
DAF unit with a capacity of 20 m^{3}/h (Also visible: flocculant preparation station and pipe flocculator)

Dissolved air flotation (DAF) is a water treatment process that clarifies wastewaters (or other waters) by the removal of suspended matter such as oil or solids. The removal is achieved by dissolving air in the water or wastewater under pressure and then releasing the air at atmospheric pressure in a flotation tank basin. The released air forms tiny bubbles which adhere to the suspended matter, causing the suspended matter to float to the surface of the water where it may then be removed by a skimming device.

Dissolved air flotation is very widely used in treating the industrial wastewater effluents from oil refineries, petrochemical and chemical plants, natural gas processing plants, paper mills, general water treatment and similar industrial facilities. A very similar process known as induced gas flotation is also used for wastewater treatment. Froth flotation is commonly used in the processing of mineral ores.

In the oil industry, dissolved gas flotation (DGF) units do not use air as the flotation medium due to the explosion risk. Nitrogen gas is used instead to create the bubbles.

== Process description ==
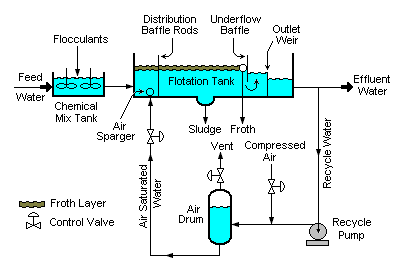
Typical DAF unit

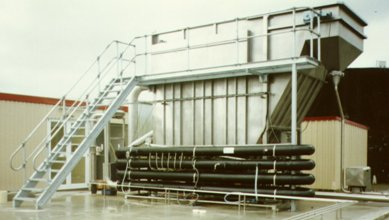
Modern DAF units using parallel plate technology are quite compact. Picture shows a 225 m^{3}/h unit

The feed water to the DAF float tank is often (but not always) dosed with a coagulant (such as ferric chloride or aluminum sulfate) to coagulate the colloidal particles and/or a flocculant to conglomerate the particles into bigger clusters.

A portion of the clarified effluent water leaving the DAF tank is pumped into a small pressure vessel (called the air drum) into which compressed air is also introduced. This results in saturating the pressurized effluent water with air. The air-saturated water stream is recycled to the front of the float tank and flows through a pressure reduction valve just as it enters the front of the float tank, which results in the air being released in the form of tiny bubbles. Bubbles form at nucleation sites on the surface of the suspended particles, adhering to the particles. As more bubbles form, the lift from the bubbles eventually overcomes the force of gravity. This causes the suspended matter to float to the surface where it forms a froth layer which is then removed by a skimmer. The froth-free water exits the float tank as the clarified effluent from the DAF unit.

Some DAF unit designs utilize parallel plate packing material (e.g. lamellas) to provide more separation surface and therefore to enhance the separation efficiency of the unit.

DAF systems can be categorized as circular (more efficient) and rectangular (more residence time). The former type requires just 3 minutes. The rectangular type requires 20 to 30 minutes. One of the bigger advantages of the circular type is its spiral scoop.

== Drinking water treatment ==
Drinking water supplies that are particularly vulnerable to unicellular algal blooms, and supplies with low turbidity and high colour often employ DAF. In such designs, following the coagulation and flocculation processes, water flows to DAF tanks where air diffusers on the tank bottom create fine bubbles that attach to floc, resulting in a floating mass of concentrated floc. The floating floc blanket is removed from the surface and clarified water is withdrawn from the bottom of the DAF tank.

== See also ==
- API oil-water separator
- Flotation process
- Industrial wastewater treatment
- Industrial water treatment
- List of waste-water treatment technologies
- Microflotation
