= Conventional pollutant =

A conventional pollutant is a term used in the USA to describe a water pollutant that is amenable to treatment by a municipal sewage treatment plant. A basic list of conventional pollutants is defined in the U.S. Clean Water Act. The list has been amended in regulations issued by the Environmental Protection Agency:

- biochemical oxygen demand (BOD)
- fecal coliform bacteria
- oil and grease
- pH (exceeding regulatory limits)
- total suspended solids (TSS).

The Secondary Treatment Regulation contains national discharge standards for BOD, pH and TSS, applicable to sewage treatment plants in the U.S.

Treatment Innovations

Existing research has looked at using microalgae systems as an environment-friendly green technology for removal of conventional contaminants in wastewater. Microalgae have been able to eliminate biochemical oxygen demand (BOD), oil and grease, and other pollutants and, simultaneously, produce biomass to be applied for other energy or agricultural use.

== See also ==
- Secondary treatment
- Water quality
- Criteria pollutants, a similar list of pollutants of air
