= Industrial wastewater treatment =

Processes for treating wastewater produced as an industrial by-product

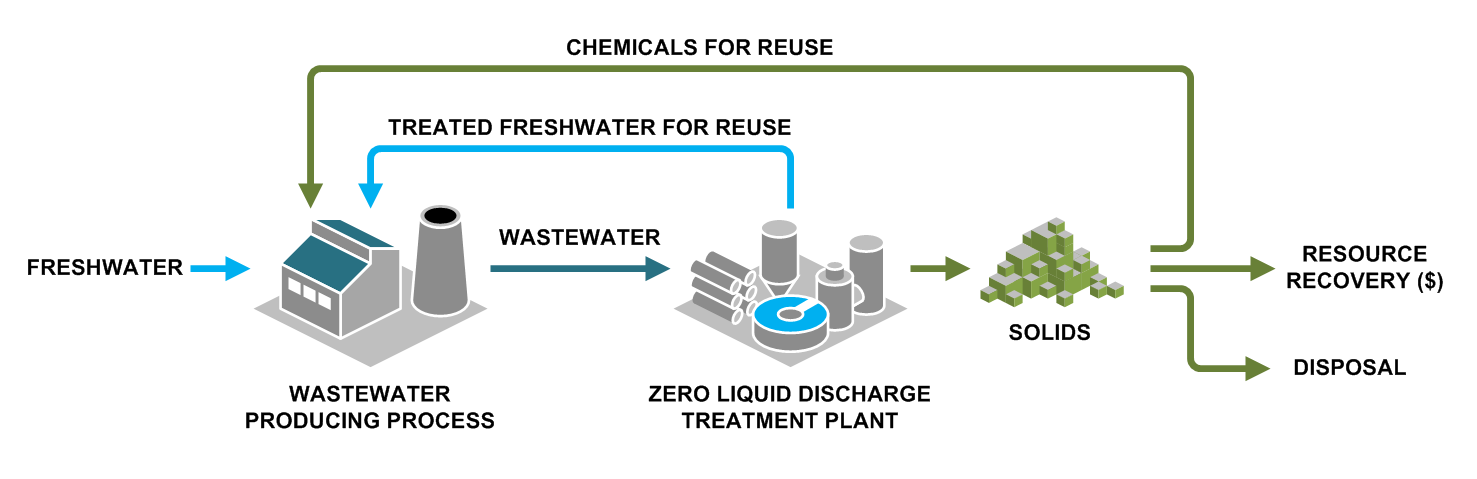
Wastewater from an industrial process can be converted at a treatment plant to solids and treated water for reuse.

Industrial wastewater treatment describes the processes used for treating wastewater that is produced by industries as an undesirable by-product. After treatment, the treated industrial wastewater (or effluent) may be reused or released to a sanitary sewer or to a surface water in the environment. Some industrial facilities generate wastewater that can be treated in sewage treatment plants. Most industrial processes, such as petroleum refineries, chemical and petrochemical plants have their own specialized facilities to treat their wastewaters so that the pollutant concentrations in the treated wastewater comply with the regulations regarding disposal of wastewaters into sewers or into rivers, lakes or oceans. This applies to industries that generate wastewater with high concentrations of organic matter (e.g. oil and grease), toxic pollutants (e.g. heavy metals, volatile organic compounds) or nutrients such as ammonia. Some industries install a pre-treatment system to remove some pollutants (e.g., toxic compounds), and then discharge the partially treated wastewater to the municipal sewer system.

Most industries produce some wastewater. Recent trends have been to minimize such production or to recycle treated wastewater within the production process. Some industries have been successful at redesigning their manufacturing processes to reduce or eliminate pollutants. Sources of industrial wastewater include battery manufacturing, chemical manufacturing, electric power plants, food industry, iron and steel industry, metal working, mines and quarries, nuclear industry, oil and gas extraction, petroleum refining and petrochemicals, pharmaceutical manufacturing, pulp and paper industry, smelters, textile mills, industrial oil contamination, water treatment and wood preserving. Treatment processes include brine treatment, solids removal (e.g. chemical precipitation, filtration), oils and grease removal, removal of biodegradable organics, removal of other organics, removal of acids and alkalis, and removal of toxic materials.

== Types ==
Industrial facilities may generate the following industrial wastewater flows:

- Manufacturing process wastestreams, which can include conventional pollutants (i.e. controllable with secondary treatment systems), toxic pollutants (e.g. solvents, heavy metals), and other harmful compounds such as nutrients
- Non-process wastestreams: boiler blowdown and cooling water, which produce thermal pollution and other pollutants
- Industrial site drainage, generated both by manufacturing facilities, service industries and energy and mining sites
- Wastestreams from the energy and mining sectors: acid mine drainage, produced water from oil and gas extraction, radionuclides
- Wastestreams that are by-products of treatment or cooling processes: backwashing (water treatment), brine.

== Contaminants ==
Industrial wastewater could add the following pollutants to receiving water bodies if the wastewater is not treated and managed properly:

- Heavy metals, including mercury, lead, and chromium
- Organic matter and nutrients such as food waste: Certain industries (e.g. food processing, slaughterhouse waste, paper fibers, plant material, etc.) discharge high concentrations of BOD, ammonia nitrogen and oil and grease.
- Inorganic particles such as sand, grit, metal particles, rubber residues from tires, ceramics, etc.;
- Toxins such as pesticides, poisons, herbicides, etc.
- Pharmaceuticals, endocrine disrupting compounds, hormones, perfluorinated compounds, siloxanes, drugs of abuse and other hazardous substances
- Microplastics such as polyethylene and polypropylene beads, polyester and polyamide
- Thermal pollution from power stations and industrial manufacturers
- Radionuclides from uranium mining, processing nuclear fuel, operating nuclear reactors, or disposal of radioactive waste.
- Some industrial discharges include persistent organic pollutants such as per- and polyfluoroalkyl substances (PFAS).

== Industrial sectors ==
The specific pollutants generated and the resultant effluent concentrations can vary widely among the industrial sectors.

=== Battery manufacturing ===
Battery manufacturers specialize in fabricating small devices for electronics and portable equipment (e.g., power tools), or larger, high-powered units for cars, trucks and other motorized vehicles. Pollutants generated at manufacturing plants includes cadmium, chromium, cobalt, copper, cyanide, iron, lead, manganese, mercury, nickel, silver, zinc, oil and grease.

=== Centralized waste treatment ===
A centralized waste treatment (CWT) facility processes liquid or solid industrial wastes generated by off-site manufacturing facilities. A manufacturer may send its wastes to a CWT plant, rather than perform treatment on site, due to constraints such as limited land availability, difficulty in designing and operating an on-site system, or limitations imposed by environmental regulations and permits. A manufacturer may determine that using a CWT is more cost-effective than treating the waste itself; this is often the case where the manufacturer is a small business.

CWT plants often receive wastes from a wide variety of manufacturers, including chemical plants, metal fabrication and finishing; and used oil and petroleum products from various manufacturing sectors. The wastes may be classified as hazardous, have high pollutant concentrations or otherwise be difficult to treat. In 2000 the U.S. Environmental Protection Agency published wastewater regulations for CWT facilities in the US.

=== Chemical manufacturing ===
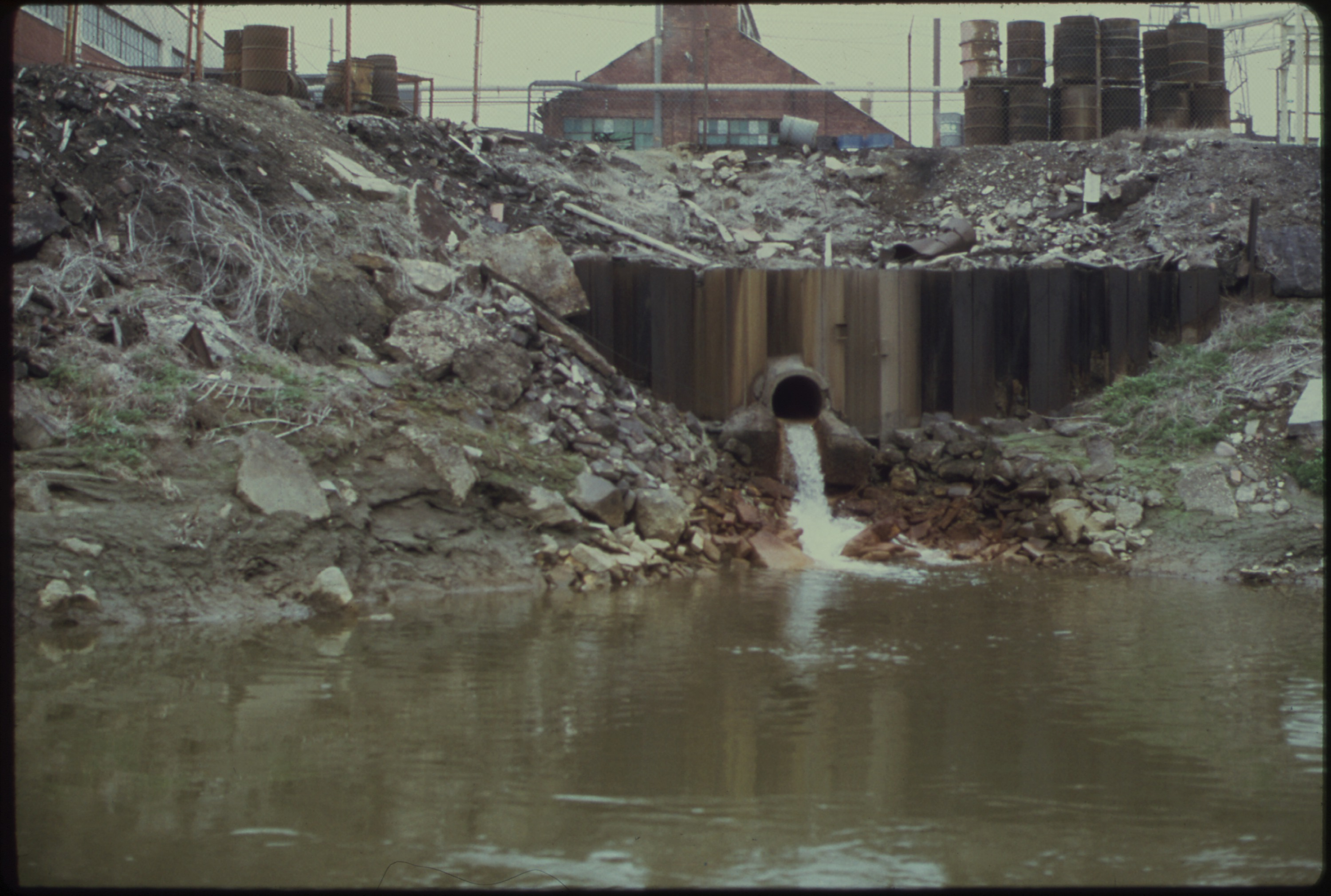
Chemical manufacturing discharge into the Cuyahoga River

==== Organic chemicals manufacturing ====
The specific pollutants discharged by organic chemical manufacturers vary widely from plant to plant, depending on the types of products manufactured, such as bulk organic chemicals, resins, pesticides, plastics, or synthetic fibers. Some of the organic compounds that may be discharged are benzene, chloroform, naphthalene, phenols, toluene and vinyl chloride. Biochemical oxygen demand (BOD), which is a gross measurement of a range of organic pollutants, may be used to gauge the effectiveness of a biological wastewater treatment system, and is used as a regulatory parameter in some discharge permits. Metal pollutant discharges may include chromium, copper, lead, nickel and zinc.

==== Inorganic chemicals manufacturing ====
The inorganic chemicals sector covers a wide variety of products and processes, although an individual plant may produce a narrow range of products and pollutants. Products include aluminum compounds; calcium carbide and calcium chloride; hydrofluoric acid; potassium compounds; borax; chrome and fluorine-based compounds; cadmium and zinc-based compounds. The pollutants discharged vary by product sector and individual plant, and may include arsenic, chlorine, cyanide, fluoride; and heavy metals such as chromium, copper, iron, lead, mercury, nickel and zinc.

=== Electric power plants ===
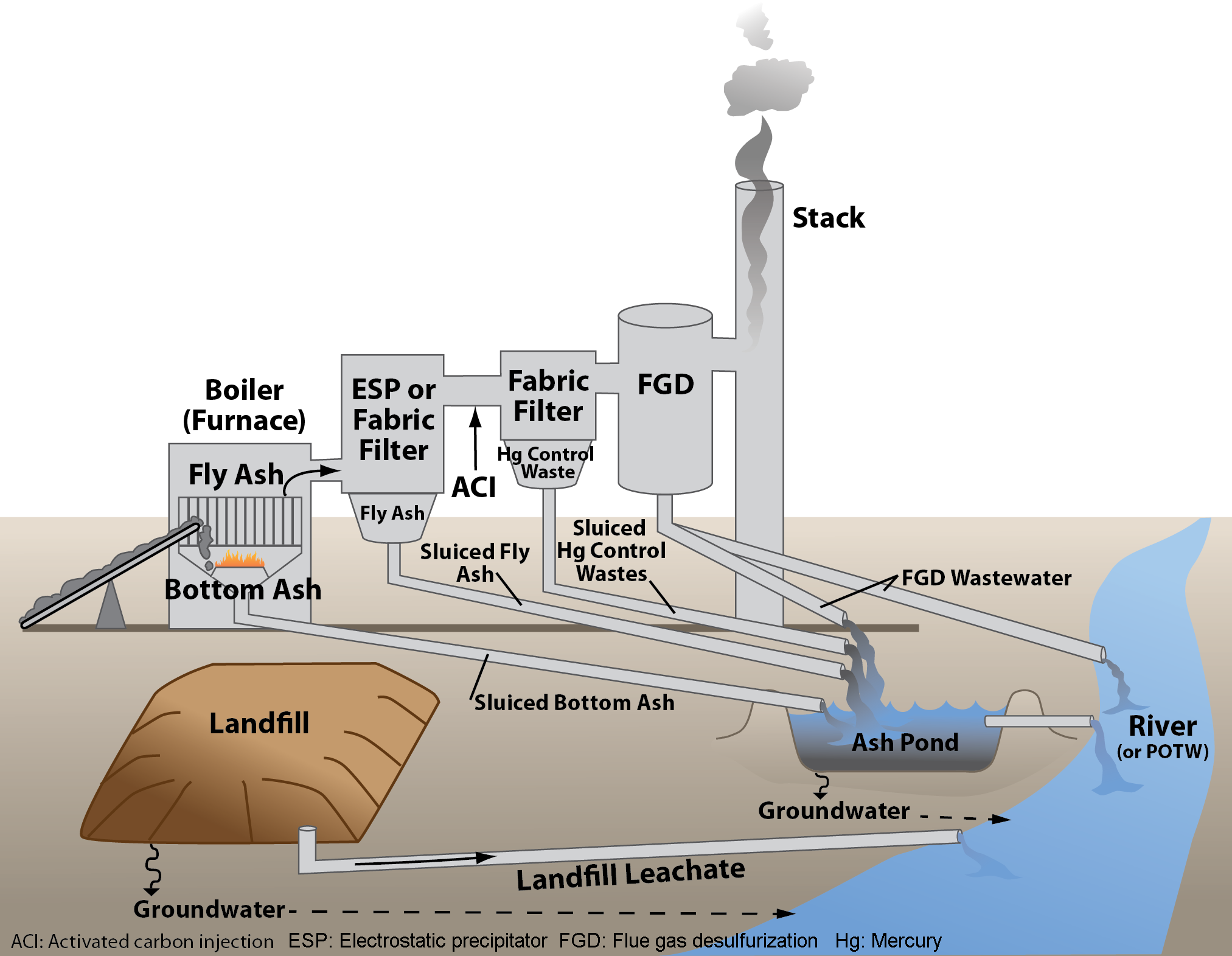
Illustration of wastewater streams discharged by typical coal-fired electric power plants in the United States

Fossil-fuel power stations, particularly coal-fired plants, are a major source of industrial wastewater. Many of these plants discharge wastewater with significant levels of metals such as lead, mercury, cadmium and chromium, as well as arsenic, selenium and nitrogen compounds (nitrates and nitrites). Wastewater streams include flue-gas desulfurization, fly ash, bottom ash and flue gas mercury control. Plants with air pollution controls such as wet scrubbers typically transfer the captured pollutants to the wastewater stream.

Ash ponds, a type of surface impoundment, are a widely used treatment technology at coal-fired plants. These ponds use gravity to settle out large particulates (measured as total suspended solids) from power plant wastewater. This technology does not treat dissolved pollutants. Power stations use additional technologies to control pollutants, depending on the particular wastestream in the plant. These include dry ash handling, closed-loop ash recycling, chemical precipitation, biological treatment (such as an activated sludge process), membrane systems, and evaporation-crystallization systems. Technological advancements in ion-exchange membranes and electrodialysis systems has enabled high efficiency treatment of flue-gas desulfurization wastewater to meet recent EPA discharge limits. The treatment approach is similar for other highly scaling industrial wastewaters.

=== Food industry ===
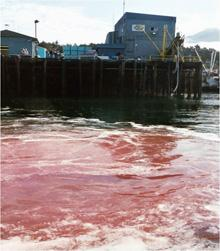
Seafood processing waste discharged to the town harbor in Sitka, Alaska

Wastewater generated from agricultural and food processing operations has distinctive characteristics that set it apart from common municipal wastewater managed by public or private sewage treatment plants throughout the world: it is biodegradable and non-toxic, but has high BOD and suspended solids (SS). The constituents of food and agriculture wastewater are often complex to predict, due to the differences in BOD and pH in effluents from vegetable, fruit, and meat products and due to the seasonal nature of food processing and post-harvesting.

Processing of food from raw materials requires large volumes of high grade water. Vegetable washing generates water with high loads of particulate matter and some dissolved organic matter. It may also contain surfactants and pesticides.

Aquaculture facilities (fish farms) often discharge large amounts of nitrogen and phosphorus, as well as suspended solids. Some facilities use drugs and pesticides, which may be present in the wastewater.

Dairy processing plants generate conventional pollutants (BOD, SS).

Animal slaughter and processing produces organic waste from body fluids, such as blood, and gut contents. Pollutants generated include BOD, SS, coliform bacteria, oil and grease, organic nitrogen and ammonia.

Processing food for sale produces wastes generated from cooking which are often rich in plant organic material and may also contain salt, flavourings, colouring material and acids or alkali. Large quantities of fats, oil and grease ("FOG") may also be present, which in sufficient concentrations can clog sewer lines. Some municipalities require restaurants and food processing businesses to use grease interceptors and regulate the disposal of FOG in the sewer system.

Food processing activities such as plant cleaning, material conveying, bottling, and product washing create wastewater. Many food processing facilities require on-site treatment before operational wastewater can be land applied or discharged to a waterway or a sewer system. High suspended solids levels of organic particles increase BOD and can result in significant sewer surcharge fees. Sedimentation, wedge wire screening, or rotating belt filtration (microscreening) are commonly used methods to reduce suspended organic solids loading prior to discharge.

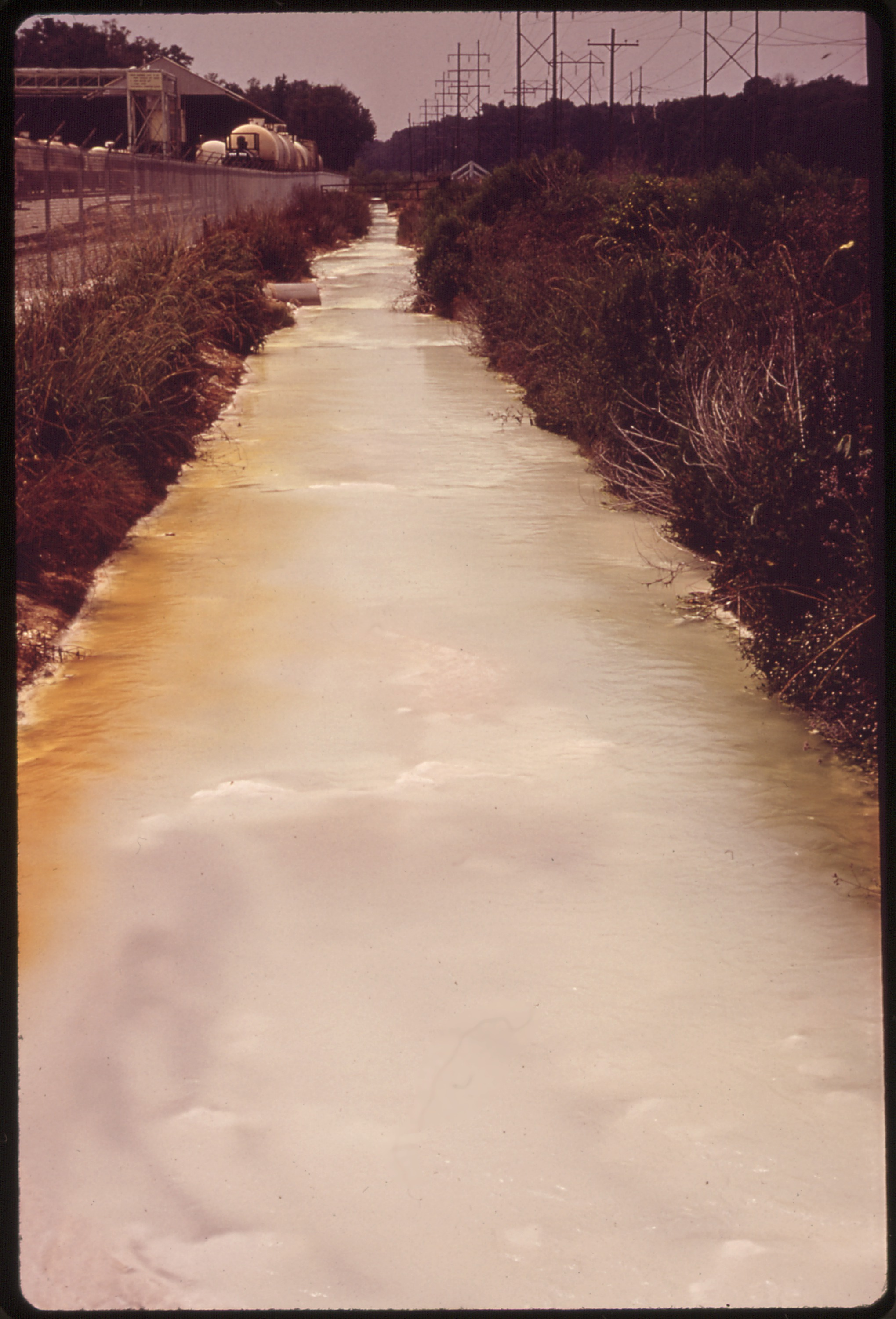
Glass manufacturing wastewater in Louisiana

=== Glass manufacturing ===
Glass manufacturing wastes vary with the type of glass manufactured, which includes fiberglass, plate glass, rolled glass, and glass containers, among others. The wastewater discharged by glass plants may include ammonia, BOD, chemical oxygen demand (COD), fluoride, lead, oil, phenol, and/or phosphorus. The discharges may also be highly acidic (low pH) or alkaline (high pH).

=== Iron and steel industry ===
The production of iron from its ores involves powerful reduction reactions in blast furnaces. Cooling waters are inevitably contaminated with products especially ammonia and cyanide. Production of coke from coal in coking plants also requires water cooling and the use of water in by-products separation. Contamination of waste streams includes gasification products such as benzene, naphthalene, anthracene, cyanide, ammonia, phenols, cresols together with a range of more complex organic compounds known collectively as polycyclic aromatic hydrocarbons (PAH).

The conversion of iron or steel into sheet, wire or rods requires hot and cold mechanical transformation stages frequently employing water as a lubricant and coolant. Contaminants include hydraulic oils, tallow and particulate solids. Final treatment of iron and steel products before onward sale into manufacturing includes pickling in strong mineral acid to remove rust and prepare the surface for tin or chromium plating or for other surface treatments such as galvanisation or painting. The two acids commonly used are hydrochloric acid and sulfuric acid. Wastewater include acidic rinse waters together with waste acid. Although many plants operate acid recovery plants (particularly those using hydrochloric acid), where the mineral acid is boiled away from the iron salts, there remains a large volume of highly acid ferrous sulfate or ferrous chloride to be disposed of. Many steel industry wastewaters are contaminated by hydraulic oil, also known as soluble oil.

=== Metal working ===
Many industries perform work on metal feedstocks (e.g. sheet metal, ingots, bar stock) as they fabricate their final products. The industries include automobile, truck and aircraft manufacturing; tools and hardware manufacturing; electronic equipment and office machines; ships and boats; appliances and other household products; and stationary industrial equipment (e.g. compressors, pumps, boilers). Typical processes conducted at these plants include grinding, machining, coating and painting, chemical etching and milling, solvent degreasing, electroplating and anodizing. Wastewater generated from these industries may contain heavy metals (common heavy metal pollutants from these industries include cadmium, chromium, copper, lead, nickel, silver and zinc), cyanide and various chemical solvents, oil, and grease.

=== Mines and quarries ===
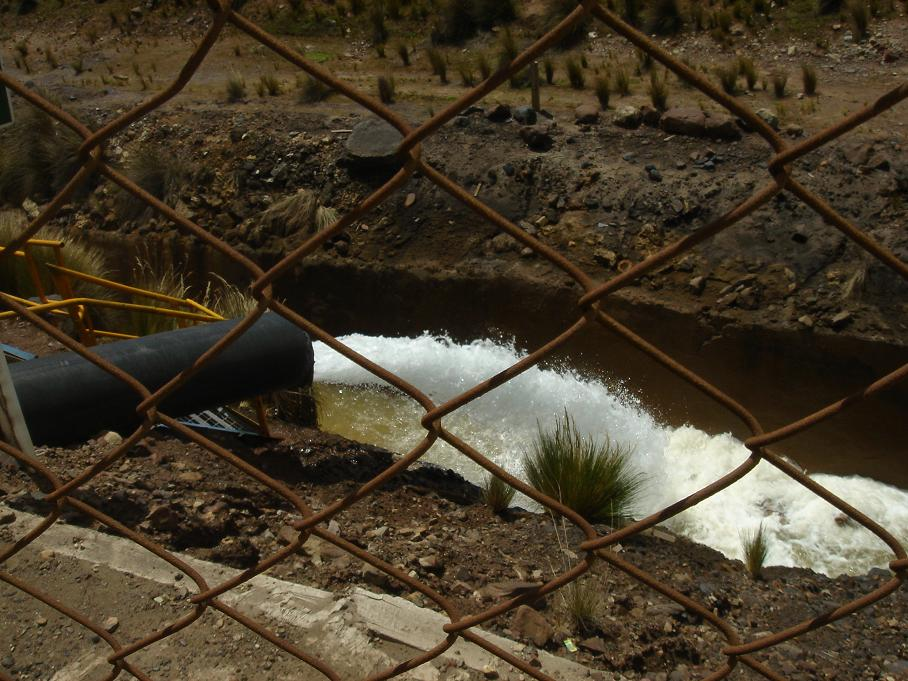
Mine wastewater effluent in Peru, with neutralized pH from tailing runoff

The principal waste-waters associated with mines and quarries are slurries of rock particles in water. These arise from rainfall washing exposed surfaces and haul roads and also from rock washing and grading processes. Volumes of water can be very high, especially rainfall related arisings on large sites. Some specialized separation operations, such as coal washing to separate coal from native rock using density gradients, can produce wastewater contaminated by fine particulate haematite and surfactants. Oils and hydraulic oils are also common contaminants.

Wastewater from metal mines and ore recovery plants are inevitably contaminated by the minerals present in the native rock formations. Following crushing and extraction of the desirable materials, undesirable materials may enter the wastewater stream. For metal mines, this can include unwanted metals such as zinc and other materials such as arsenic. Extraction of high value metals such as gold and silver may generate slimes containing very fine particles in where physical removal of contaminants becomes particularly difficult.

Additionally, the geologic formations that harbour economically valuable metals such as copper and gold very often consist of sulphide-type ores. The processing entails grinding the rock into fine particles and then extracting the desired metal(s), with the leftover rock being known as tailings. These tailings contain a combination of not only undesirable leftover metals, but also sulphide components which eventually form sulphuric acid upon the exposure to air and water that inevitably occurs when the tailings are disposed of in large impoundments. The resulting acid mine drainage, which is often rich in heavy metals (because acids dissolve metals), is one of the many environmental impacts of mining.

=== Nuclear industry ===
The waste production from the nuclear and radio-chemicals industry is dealt with as Radioactive waste.

Researchers have looked at the bioaccumulation of strontium by Scenedesmus spinosus (algae) in simulated wastewater. The study claims a highly selective biosorption capacity for strontium of S. spinosus, suggesting that it may be appropriate for use of nuclear wastewater.

=== Oil and gas extraction ===
Oil and gas well operations generate produced water, which may contain oils, toxic metals (e.g. arsenic, cadmium, chromium, mercury, lead), salts, organic chemicals and solids. Some produced water contains traces of naturally occurring radioactive material. Offshore oil and gas platforms also generate deck drainage, domestic waste and sanitary waste. During the drilling process, well sites typically discharge drill cuttings and drilling mud (drilling fluid).

=== Petroleum refining and petrochemicals ===
Pollutants discharged at petroleum refineries and petrochemical plants include conventional pollutants (BOD, oil and grease, suspended solids), ammonia, chromium, phenols and sulfides.

=== Pharmaceutical manufacturing ===
Pharmaceutical plants typically generate a variety of process wastewaters, including solvents, spent acid and caustic solutions, water from chemical reactions, product wash water, condensed steam, blowdown from air pollution control scrubbers, and equipment washwater. Non-process wastewaters typically include cooling water and site runoff. Pollutants generated by the industry include acetone, ammonia, benzene, BOD, chloroform, cyanide, ethanol, ethyl acetate, isopropanol, methylene chloride, methanol, phenol and toluene. Treatment technologies used include advanced biological treatment (e.g. activated sludge with nitrification), multimedia filtration, cyanide destruction (e.g. hydrolysis), steam stripping and wastewater recycling.

=== Pulp and paper industry ===
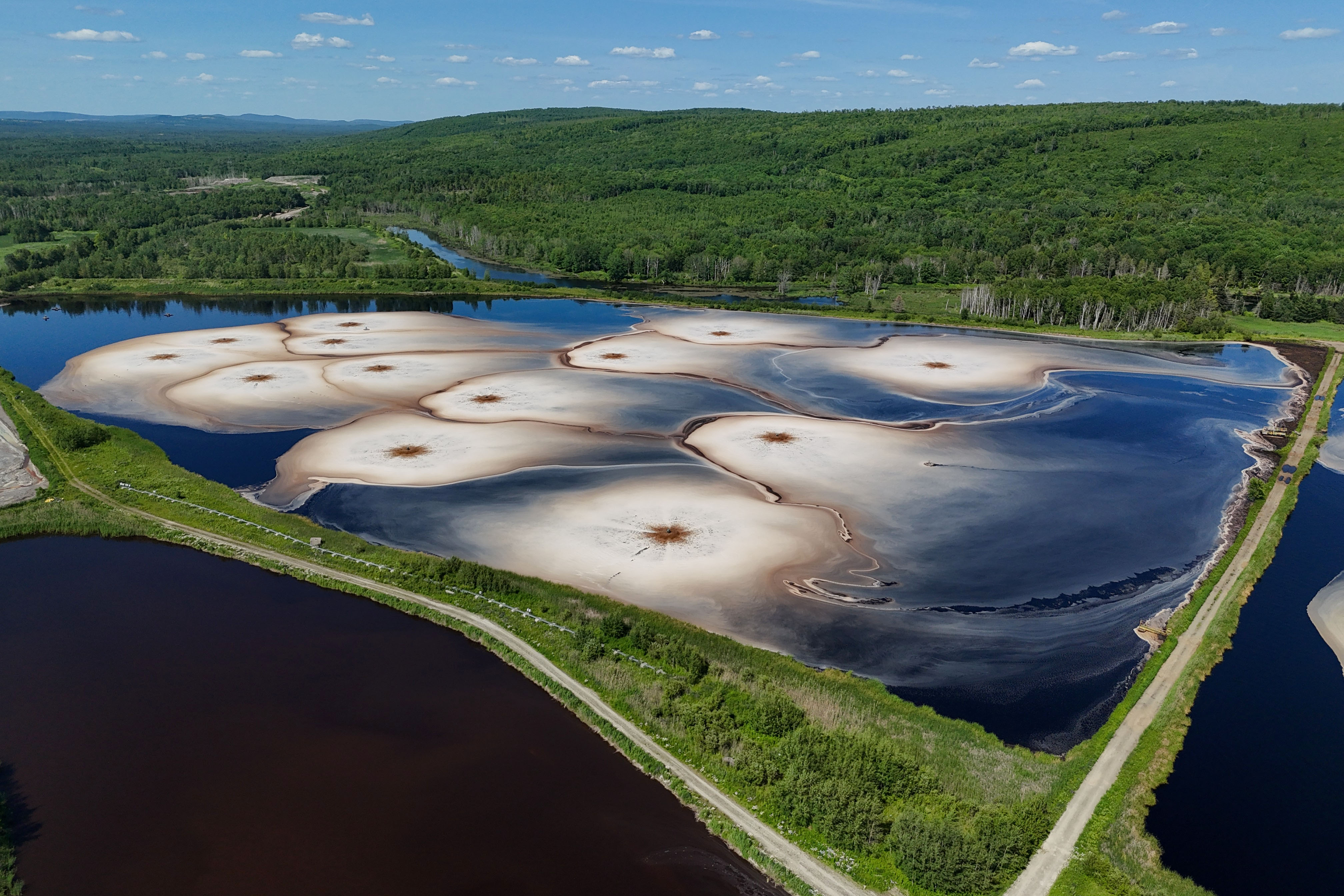
Aerated treatment lagoon at a paper mill in Canada

Effluent from the pulp and paper industry is generally high in suspended solids and BOD. Plants that bleach wood pulp for paper making may generate chloroform, dioxins (including 2,3,7,8-TCDD), furans, phenols, and chemical oxygen demand (COD). Stand-alone paper mills using imported pulp may only require simple primary treatment, such as sedimentation or dissolved air flotation. Increased BOD or COD loadings, as well as organic pollutants, may require biological treatment such as activated sludge or upflow anaerobic sludge blanket reactors. For mills with high inorganic loadings like salt, tertiary treatments may be required, either general membrane treatments like ultrafiltration or reverse osmosis or treatments to remove specific contaminants, such as nutrients.

=== Smelters ===
The pollutants discharged by nonferrous smelters vary with the base metal ore. Bauxite smelters generate phenols but typically use settling basins and evaporation to manage these wastes, with no need to routinely discharge wastewater. Aluminum smelters typically discharge fluoride, benzo(a)pyrene, antimony and nickel, as well as aluminum. Copper smelters typically generate cadmium, lead, zinc, arsenic and nickel, in addition to copper, in their wastewater. Lead smelters discharge lead and zinc. Nickel and cobalt smelters discharge ammonia and copper in addition to the base metals. Zinc smelters discharge arsenic, cadmium, copper, lead, selenium and zinc.

Typical treatment processes used in the industry are chemical precipitation, sedimentation and filtration.

=== Textile mills ===
Textile mills, including carpet manufacturers, generate wastewater from a wide variety of processes, including cleaning and finishing, yarn manufacturing and fabric finishing (such as bleaching, dyeing, resin treatment, waterproofing and retardant flameproofing). Pollutants generated by textile mills include BOD, SS, oil and grease, sulfide, phenols and chromium. Insecticide residues in fleeces are a particular problem in treating waters generated in wool processing. Animal fats may be present in the wastewater, which if not contaminated, can be recovered for the production of tallow or further rendering.

Textile dyeing plants generate wastewater that contain synthetic (e.g., reactive dyes, acid dyes, basic dyes, disperse dyes, vat dyes, sulphur dyes, mordant dyes, direct dyes, ingrain dyes, solvent dyes, pigment dyes) and natural dyestuff, gum thickener (guar) and various wetting agents, pH buffers and dye retardants or accelerators. Following treatment with polymer-based flocculants and settling agents, typical monitoring parameters include BOD, COD, color (ADMI), sulfide, oil and grease, phenol, TSS and heavy metals (chromium, zinc, lead, copper).

=== Industrial oil contamination ===
Industrial applications where oil enters the wastewater stream may include vehicle wash bays, workshops, fuel storage depots, transport hubs and power generation. Often the wastewater is discharged into local sewer or trade waste systems and must meet local environmental specifications. Typical contaminants can include solvents, detergents, grit, lubricants and hydrocarbons.

=== Water treatment ===
Many industries have a need to treat water to obtain very high quality water for their processes. This might include pure chemical synthesis or boiler feed water. Also, some water treatment processes produce organic and mineral sludges from filtration and sedimentation which require treatment. Ion exchange using natural or synthetic resins removes calcium, magnesium and carbonate ions from water, typically replacing them with sodium, chloride, hydroxyl and/or other ions. Regeneration of ion-exchange columns with strong acids and alkalis produces a wastewater rich in hardness ions which are readily precipitated out, especially when in admixture with other wastewater constituents.

=== Wood preserving ===
Wood preserving plants generate conventional and toxic pollutants, including arsenic, COD, copper, chromium, abnormally high or low pH, phenols, suspended solids, oil and grease.

== Treatment methods ==
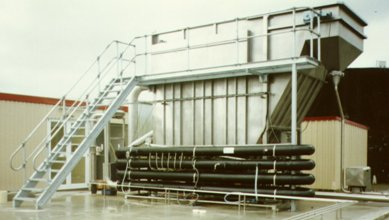
Dissolved air flotation systems are widely used at oil refineries, chemical plants and paper mills

The various types of contamination of wastewater require a variety of strategies to remove the contamination. Most industrial processes, such as petroleum refineries, chemical and petrochemical plants have onsite facilities to treat their wastewaters so that the pollutant concentrations in the treated wastewater comply with the regulations regarding disposal of wastewaters into sewers or into rivers, lakes or oceans. Constructed wetlands are being used in an increasing number of cases as they provided high quality and productive on-site treatment. Other industrial processes that produce a lot of waste-waters such as paper and pulp production have created environmental concern, leading to development of processes to recycle water use within plants before they have to be cleaned and disposed.

An industrial wastewater treatment plant may include one or more of the following rather than the conventional treatment sequence of sewage treatment plants:

- An API oil-water separator, for removing separate phase oil from wastewater.
- A clarifier, for removing solids from wastewater.
- A roughing filter, to reduce the biochemical oxygen demand of wastewater.
- A carbon filtration plant, to remove toxic dissolved organic compounds from wastewater.
- An advanced electrodialysis reversal (EDR) system with ion-exchange membranes.

=== Brine treatment ===
Brine treatment involves removing dissolved salt ions from the waste stream. Although similarities to seawater or brackish water desalination exist, industrial brine treatment may contain unique combinations of dissolved ions, such as hardness ions or other metals, necessitating specific processes and equipment.

Brine treatment systems are typically optimized to either reduce the volume of the final discharge for more economic disposal (as disposal costs are often based on volume) or maximize the recovery of fresh water or salts. Brine treatment systems may also be optimized to reduce electricity consumption, chemical usage, or physical footprint.

Brine treatment is commonly encountered when treating cooling tower blowdown, produced water from steam-assisted gravity drainage (SAGD), produced water from natural gas extraction such as coal seam gas, frac flowback water, acid mine or acid rock drainage, reverse osmosis reject, chlor-alkali wastewater, pulp and paper mill effluent, and waste streams from food and beverage processing.

Brine treatment technologies may include: membrane filtration processes, such as reverse osmosis; ion-exchange processes such as electrodialysis or weak acid cation exchange; or evaporation processes, such as brine concentrators and crystallizers employing mechanical vapour recompression and steam. Due to the ever increasing discharge standards, there has been an emergence of the use of advance oxidation processes for the treatment of brine. Some notable examples such as Fenton's oxidation and ozonation have been employed for degradation of recalcitrant compounds in brine from industrial plants.

Reverse osmosis may not be viable for brine treatment, due to the potential for fouling caused by hardness salts or organic contaminants, or damage to the reverse osmosis membranes from hydrocarbons.

Evaporation processes are the most widespread for brine treatment as they enable the highest degree of concentration, as high as solid salt. They also produce the highest purity effluent, even distillate-quality. Evaporation processes are also more tolerant of organics, hydrocarbons, or hardness salts. However, energy consumption is high and corrosion may be an issue as the prime mover is concentrated salt water. As a result, evaporation systems typically employ titanium or duplex stainless steel materials.

==== Brine management ====
Brine management examines the broader context of brine treatment and may include consideration of government policy and regulations, corporate sustainability, environmental impact, recycling, handling and transport, containment, centralized compared to on-site treatment, avoidance and reduction, technologies, and economics. Brine management shares some issues with leachate management and more general waste management. In the recent years, there has been greater prevalence in brine management due to global push for zero liquid discharge (ZLD)/minimal liquid discharge (MLD).

In ZLD/MLD techniques, a closed water cycle is used to minimize water discharges from a system for water reuse. This concept has been gaining traction in recent years, due to increased water discharges and recent advancement in membrane technology. Increasingly, there has been also greater efforts to increase the recovery of materials from brines, especially from mining, geothermal wastewater or desalination brines. Various literature demonstrates the variability of extraction of valuable materials like sodium bicarbonates, sodium chlorides and precious metals (like rubidium, cesium and lithium). The concept of ZLD/MLD encompasses the downstream management of wastewater brines, to reduce discharges and also derive valuable products from it.

=== Solids removal ===
Most solids can be removed using simple sedimentation techniques with the solids recovered as slurry or sludge. Very fine solids and solids with densities close to the density of water pose special problems. In such case filtration or ultrafiltration may be required. Although flocculation may be used, using alum salts or the addition of polyelectrolytes. Wastewater from industrial food processing often requires on-site treatment before it can be discharged to prevent or reduce sewer surcharge fees. The type of industry and specific operational practices determine what types of wastewater is generated and what type of treatment is required. Reducing solids such as waste product, organic materials, and sand is often a goal of industrial wastewater treatment. Some common ways to reduce solids include primary sedimentation (clarification), dissolved air flotation (DAF), belt filtration (microscreening), and drum screening.

=== Oils and grease removal ===
The effective removal of oils and grease is dependent on the characteristics of the oil in terms of its suspension state and droplet size, which will in turn affect the choice of separator technology. Oil in industrial waste water may be free light oil, heavy oil, which tends to sink, and emulsified oil, often referred to as soluble oil. Emulsified or soluble oils will typically required "cracking" to free the oil from its emulsion. In most cases this is achieved by lowering the pH of the water matrix.

Most separator technologies will have an optimum range of oil droplet sizes that can be effectively treated. Each separator technology will have its own performance curve outlining optimum performance based on oil droplet size. The most common separators are gravity tanks or pits, API oil-water separators or plate packs, chemical treatment via dissolved air flotations, centrifuges, media filters and hydrocyclones.

Analyzing the oily water to determine droplet size can be performed with a video particle analyser.

==== API oil-water separators ====
An API oil–water separator is a device designed to separate gross amounts of oil and suspended solids from industrial wastewater produced at oil refineries, petrochemical plants, chemical plants, natural gas processing plants and other industrial oily water sources. The API separator is a gravity separation device designed by using Stokes Law to define the rise velocity of oil droplets based on their density and size. The design is based on the specific gravity difference between the oil and the wastewater because that difference is much smaller than the specific gravity difference between the suspended solids and water. The suspended solids settles to the bottom of the separator as a sediment layer, the oil rises to top of the separator and the cleansed wastewater is the middle layer between the oil layer and the solids.

==== Hydrocyclone ====
Hydrocyclone separators operate on the process where wastewater enters the cyclone chamber and is spun under extreme centrifugal forces more than 1000 times the force of gravity. This force causes the water and oil droplets (or solid particles) to separate. The separated materials is discharged from one end of the cyclone where treated water is discharged through the opposite end for further treatment, filtration or discharge. Hydrocyclones can also be utilised in a variety of context from solid-liquid separation to oil-water separation.

=== Removal of biodegradable organics ===
Biodegradable organic material of plant or animal origin is usually possible to treat using extended conventional sewage treatment processes such as activated sludge or trickling filter. Problems can arise if the wastewater is excessively diluted with washing water or is highly concentrated such as undiluted blood or milk. The presence of cleaning agents, disinfectants, pesticides, or antibiotics can have detrimental impacts on treatment processes.

==== Activated sludge process ====
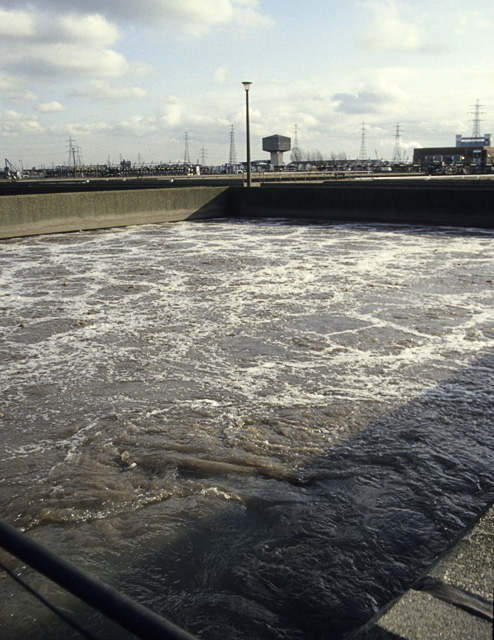
Activated sludge tank at Beckton sewage treatment plant, UK. The white bubbles are due to the diffused air aeration system.

The activated sludge process is a type of biological wastewater treatment process for treating sewage or industrial wastewaters using aeration and a biological floc composed of bacteria and protozoa. It is one of several biological wastewater treatment alternatives in secondary treatment, which deals with the removal of biodegradable organic matter and suspended solids. It uses air (or oxygen) and microorganisms to biologically oxidize organic pollutants, producing a waste sludge (or floc) containing the oxidized material.

The activated sludge process for removing carbonaceous pollution begins with an aeration tank where air (or oxygen) is injected into the waste water. This is followed by a settling tank to allow the biological flocs (the sludge blanket) to settle, thus separating the biological sludge from the clear treated water. Part of the waste sludge is recycled to the aeration tank and the remaining waste sludge is removed for further treatment and ultimate disposal.

==== Trickling filter process ====
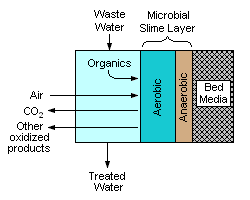
A schematic cross-section of the contact face of the bed media in a trickling filter

A typical complete trickling filter system

A trickling filter consists of a bed of rocks, gravel, slag, peat moss, or plastic media over which wastewater flows downward and contacts a layer (or film) of microbial slime covering the bed media. Aerobic conditions are maintained by forced air flowing through the bed or by natural convection of air. The process involves adsorption of organic compounds in the wastewater by the microbial slime layer, diffusion of air into the slime layer to provide the oxygen required for the biochemical oxidation of the organic compounds. The end products include carbon dioxide gas, water and other products of the oxidation. As the slime layer thickens, it becomes difficult for the air to penetrate the layer and an inner anaerobic layer is formed.

=== Removal of other organics ===
Synthetic organic materials including solvents, paints, pharmaceuticals, pesticides, products from coke production and so forth can be very difficult to treat. Treatment methods are often specific to the material being treated. Methods include advanced oxidation processing, distillation, adsorption, ozonation, vitrification, incineration, chemical immobilisation or landfill disposal. Some materials such as some detergents may be capable of biological degradation and in such cases, a modified form of wastewater treatment can be used.

=== Removal of acids and alkalis ===
Acids and alkalis can usually be neutralised under controlled conditions. Neutralisation frequently produces a precipitate that will require treatment as a solid residue that may also be toxic. In some cases, gases may be evolved requiring treatment for the gas stream. Some other forms of treatment are usually required following neutralisation.

Waste streams rich in hardness ions as from de-ionisation processes can readily lose the hardness ions in a buildup of precipitated calcium and magnesium salts. This precipitation process can cause severe furring of pipes and can, in extreme cases, cause the blockage of disposal pipes. A 1-metre diameter industrial marine discharge pipe serving a major chemicals complex was blocked by such salts in the 1970s. Treatment is by concentration of de-ionisation waste waters and disposal to landfill or by careful pH management of the released wastewater.

=== Removal of toxic materials ===
Toxic materials including many organic materials, metals (such as zinc, silver, cadmium, thallium, etc.) acids, alkalis, non-metallic elements (such as arsenic or selenium) are generally resistant to biological processes unless very dilute. Metals can often be precipitated out by changing the pH or by treatment with other chemicals. Many, however, are resistant to treatment or mitigation and may require concentration followed by landfilling or recycling. Dissolved organics can be incinerated within the wastewater by the advanced oxidation process.

==== Smart capsules ====
Molecular encapsulation is a technology that has the potential to provide a system for the recyclable removal of lead and other ions from polluted sources. Nano-, micro- and milli- capsules, with sizes in the ranges 10 nm–1μm,1μm–1mm and >1mm, respectively, are particles that have an active reagent (core) surrounded by a carrier (shell).There are three types of capsule under investigation: alginate-based capsules, carbon nanotubes, polymer swelling capsules. These capsules provide a possible means for the remediation of contaminated water.

=== Removal of thermal pollution ===
To remove heat from wastewater generated by power plants or manufacturing plants, and thus to reduce thermal pollution, the following technologies are used:

- cooling ponds, engineered bodies of water designed for cooling by evaporation, convection, and radiation
- cooling towers, which transfer waste heat to the atmosphere through evaporation or heat transfer
- cogeneration, a process where waste heat is recycled for domestic or industrial heating purposes.

=== Other disposal methods ===
Some facilities such as oil and gas wells may be permitted to pump their wastewater underground through injection wells. However, wastewater injection has been linked to induced seismicity.

== Costs and trade waste charges ==
Economies of scale may favor a situation where industrial wastewater (with pre-treatment or without treatment) is discharged to the sewer and then treated at a large municipal sewage treatment plant. Typically, trade waste charges are applied in that case. Or it might be more economical to have full treatment of industrial wastewater on the same site where it is generated and then discharging this treated industrial wastewater to a suitable surface water body. This effectively reduces wastewater treatment charges collected by municipal sewage treatment plants by pre-treating wastewaters to reduce concentrations of pollutants measured to determine user fees.

Industrial wastewater plants may also reduce raw water costs by converting selected wastewaters to reclaimed water used for different purposes.

== Society and culture ==
=== Global goals ===
The international community has defined the treatment of industrial wastewater as an important part of sustainable development by including it in Sustainable Development Goal 6. Target 6.3 of this goal is to "By 2030, improve water quality by reducing pollution, eliminating dumping and minimizing release of hazardous chemicals and materials, halving the proportion of untreated wastewater and substantially increasing recycling and safe reuse globally". One of the indicators for this target is the "proportion of domestic and industrial wastewater flows safely treated".

== See also ==
- Best management practice for water pollution (BMP)
- List of waste water treatment technologies
- Purified water (for industrial use)
- Water purification (for drinking water)
