= Industrial water treatment =

There are many uses of water in industry and, in most cases, the used water also needs treatment to render it fit for re-use or disposal. Raw water entering an industrial plant often needs treatment to meet tight quality specifications to be of use in specific industrial processes. Industrial water treatment encompasses all these aspects which include industrial wastewater treatment, boiler water treatment and cooling water treatment.

== Overview ==
Water treatment is used to reduce impact on equipment used in industrial processes, such as heating, cooling, processing, cleaning, and rinsing so that operating costs and risks are reduced. Poor water treatment lets water interact with the surfaces of pipes and vessels which contain it. Steam boilers can scale up or corrode, and these deposits will mean more fuel is needed to heat the same amount of water. Cooling towers can also scale up and corrode, but left untreated, the warm, dirty water they can contain will encourage bacteria to grow, and Legionnaires' disease can be the fatal consequence. Water treatment is also used to improve the quality of water contacting the manufactured product (e.g., semiconductors) and/or can be part of the product (e.g., beverages, pharmaceuticals). In these instances, poor water treatment can cause defective products.

In many cases, effluent water from one process can be suitable for reuse in another process if given suitable treatment. This can reduce costs by lowering charges for water consumption, reduce the costs of effluent disposal because of reduced volume, and lower energy costs due to the recovery of heat in recycled wastewater.

== Objectives ==
Industrial water treatment seeks to manage four main problem areas: scaling, corrosion, microbiological activity and disposal of residual wastewater. Boilers do not have many problems with microbes as the high temperatures prevent their growth.

Scaling occurs when the chemistry and temperature conditions are such that the dissolved mineral salts in the water are caused to precipitate and form solid deposits. These can be mobile, like a fine silt, or can build up in layers on the metal surfaces of the systems. Scale is a problem because it insulates and heat exchange becomes less efficient as the scale thickens, which wastes energy. Scale also narrows pipe widths and therefore increases the energy used in pumping the water through the pipes.

Corrosion occurs when the parent metal oxidises (as iron rusts, for example) and gradually the integrity of the plant equipment is compromised. The corrosion products can cause similar problems to scale, but corrosion can also lead to leaks, which in a pressurised system can lead to catastrophic failures.

Microbes can thrive in untreated cooling water, which is warm and sometimes full of organic nutrients as wet cooling towers are very efficient air scrubbers. Dust, flies, grass, fungal spores, and others collect in the water and create a sort of "microbial soup" if not treated with biocides. Many outbreaks of the deadly Legionnaires' Disease have been traced to unmanaged cooling towers, and the UK has had stringent Health & Safety guidelines concerning cooling tower operations for many years as have had governmental agencies in other countries.

Certain processes like tanning and paper making use heavy metals such as Chrome for tanning. Although most is used up but some amount remains and gets carried away with water. The presence in drinking water is toxic when consumed so even the smallest amount must be removed.

== Disposal of residual industrial wastewaters ==
Disposal of residual wastewaters from an industrial plant is a difficult and costly problem. Most petroleum refineries, chemical and petrochemical plants have onsite facilities to treat their wastewaters so that the pollutant concentrations in the treated wastewater comply with the local and/or national regulations regarding disposal of wastewaters into sewage treatment plants or into rivers, lakes or oceans.

== Processes ==
Two of the main processes of industrial water treatment are boiler water treatment and cooling water treatment. A large amount of proper water treatment can lead to the reaction of solids and bacteria within pipe work and boiler housing. Steam boilers can suffer from scale or corrosion when left untreated. Scale deposits can lead to weak and dangerous machinery, while additional fuel is required to heat the same level of water because of the rise in thermal resistance. Poor quality dirty water can become a breeding ground for bacteria such as Legionella causing a risk to public health.

Corrosion in low pressure boilers can be caused by dissolved oxygen, acidity and excessive alkalinity. Water treatment therefore should remove the dissolved oxygen and maintain the boiler water with the appropriate pH and alkalinity levels. Without effective water treatment, a cooling water system can suffer from scale formation, corrosion and fouling and may become a breeding ground for harmful bacteria. This reduces efficiency, shortens plant life and makes operations unreliable and unsafe.

=== Boiler water treatment ===
Boiler water treatment is a type of industrial water treatment focused on removal or chemical modification of substances potentially damaging to the boiler. Varying types of treatment are used at different locations to avoid scale, corrosion, or foaming. External treatment of raw water supplies intended for use within a boiler is focused on removal of impurities before they reach the boiler. Internal treatment within the boiler is focused on limiting the tendency of water to dissolve the boiler, and maintaining impurities in forms least likely to cause trouble before they can be removed from the boiler in boiler blowdown. Deaerator is used to reduce oxygen and nitrogen in boiler feed water applications.

=== Cooling water treatment ===
Water cooling is a method of heat removal from components of machinery and industrial equipment. Water may be a more efficient heat transfer fluid where air cooling is ineffective. In most occupied climates water offers the thermal conductivity advantages of a liquid with unusually high specific heat capacity and the option that of evaporative cooling. Low cost often allows rejection as waste after a single use, but recycling coolant loops may be pressurized to eliminate evaporative loss and offer greater portability and improved cleanliness. Unpressurized recycling coolant loops using evaporative cooling require a blowdown waste stream to remove impurities concentrated by evaporation. Disadvantages of water cooling systems include accelerated corrosion and maintenance requirements to prevent heat transfer reductions from biofouling or scale formation. Chemical additives to reduce these disadvantages may introduce toxicity to wastewater. Water cooling is commonly used for cooling automobile internal combustion engines and large industrial facilities such as nuclear and steam electric power plants, hydroelectric generators, petroleum refineries and chemical plants.

== Technologies ==
Advancements in water treatment technology have affected all areas of industrial water treatment. Although mechanical filtration, such as reverse osmosis, is widely employed to filter contaminants, other technologies including the use of ozone generators, wastewater evaporation, electrodeionization and bioremediation are also able to address the challenges of industrial water treatment.

Ozone treatment is a process in which ozone gas is injected into waste streams as a means to reduce or eliminate the need for water treatment chemicals or sanitizers that may be hazardous, including chlorine.

=== Chemical treatment ===
Chemical treatments utilize the additive of chemicals to make industrial water suitable for use or discharge. That includes processes like chemical precipitation, chemical disinfection, Advanced oxidation process (AOP), ion exchange, and chemical neutralization. AOPs are attractive in the treatment of hazardous wastewater due to its high oxidation potential and degradation performance. In AOPs, oxidants like Fenton's reagent, Ozone or Hydrogen peroxide are introduced in the wastewater to degrade harmful substances in industrial water for discharge.

=== Physical treatment ===
Physical treatment involves the separation of solids form industrial wastewater either through Filtration or Dissolved air flotation. Filtration involves the use of Membrane or filters such as mechanical filters like sand filtration etc to achieve solid-liquid separation. Whereas for Dissolved air flotation,

pressurized air is pumped into the wastewater. The pressurized air then forms small bubbles which adhere to the suspended matter causing them to float to the surface of the water where they can be removed by a skimming device or an overflow.

=== Biological treatment ===
Biological treatment is needed to treat wastewater containing biodegradable elements. It is commonly used in municipal and industrial wastewater management facilities and usually consists in adding common bacteria and other microbes, mostly environmentally friendly, to treat the water. It is a sustainable practice that has been successful for over a century.

Slow sand filters use a biological process to purify raw water to produce potable water. They work by using a complex biological film that grows naturally on the surface of sand. This gelatinous biofilm called the hypogeal layer or Schmutzdecke is located in the upper few millimetres of the sand layer. The surface biofilm purifies the water as it flows through the layer, the underlying sand provides a support medium for the biological treatment layer. The Schmutzdecke consists of bacteria, fungi, protozoa, rotifera and a range of aquatic insect larvae. As the biofilm ages, more algae may develop and larger aquatic organisms including bryozoa, snails and Annelid worms may be present. As water passes through the hypogeal layer, particles of matter are trapped in the mucilaginous matrix and soluble organic material is adsorbed. The contaminants are metabolised by the bacteria, fungi and protozoa.

Slow sand filters are typically 1–2 metres deep, and have a hydraulic loading rate of 0.2–0.4 cubic metres per square metre per hour. Filters lose their performance as the biofilm thickens and reduces the rate of flow. The filter is refurbished by removing the biofilm and a thin upper layer of sand. Water is decanted back into the filter and re-circulated to enable a new biofilm to develop. Alternatively wet harrowing involves stirring the sand and flushing the biolayer through for disposal.

=== Ultraviolet irradiation ===
Ultraviolet (UV) disinfection technology has been a common water treatment technology in the past two decades due to its ability to provide disinfected water without the use of harmful chemicals. The UV-C portion represents wavelengths from 200 nm - 280 nm which is used for disinfection. UV-C photons penetrate cells and damage the nucleic acid, rendering them incapable of reproduction, or microbiologically inactive.

=== Process water treatment technology ===
Process water is water that is used in a variety of manufacturing operations, such as: coating and plating; rinsing and spraying; washing, etc. Municipal and ground water often contain dissolved minerals which make it unsuitable for these processes because it would affect product quality and/or increase manufacturing costs. A proper incoming water treatment system can remedy these issues and create the right water conditions for specific industrial processes.

== See also ==
- Water treatment
- Wastewater treatment
- Wastewater quality indicators
- Cooling tower
- Fouling
- Pumpable ice technology
