= Total suspended solids =

Water quality parameter

Total suspended solids (TSS) is the dry-weight of suspended particles, that are not dissolved, in a sample of water that can be trapped by a filter that is analyzed using a filtration apparatus known as sintered glass crucible. TSS is a water quality parameter used to assess the quality of a specimen of any type of water or water body, ocean water for example, or wastewater after treatment in a wastewater treatment plant. It is listed as a conventional pollutant in the U.S. Clean Water Act. Total dissolved solids is another parameter acquired through a separate analysis which is also used to determine water quality based on the total substances that are fully dissolved within the water, rather than undissolved suspended particles.

TSS is also referred to using the terms total suspended matter (TSM) and suspended particulate matter (SPM). All three terms describe the same essential measurement. TSS was previously called non-filterable residue (NFR), but was changed to TSS because of ambiguity in other scientific disciplines.

== Measurement ==
TSS of a water or wastewater sample is determined by pouring a carefully measured volume of water (typically one litre; but less if the particulate density is high, or as much as two or three litres for very clean water) through a pre-weighed filter of a specified pore size, then weighing the filter again after the drying process that removes all water on the filter. Filters for TSS measurements are typically composed of glass fibres. The gain in weight is a dry weight measure of the particulates present in the water sample expressed in units derived or calculated from the volume of water filtered (typically milligrams per litre or mg/L).

If the water contains an appreciable amount of dissolved substances (as certainly would be the case when measuring TSS in seawater), these will add to the weight of the filter as it is dried. Therefore, it is necessary to "wash" the filter and sample with deionized water after filtering the sample and before drying the filter. Failure to add this step is a fairly common mistake made by inexperienced laboratory technicians working with sea water samples, and will completely invalidate the results as the weight of salts left on the filter during drying can easily exceed that of the suspended particulate matter.

Although turbidity purports to measure approximately the same water quality property as TSS, the latter is preferred when available as it provides an actual weight of the particulate material present in the sample. In water quality monitoring situations, a series of more labor-intensive TSS measurements will be paired with relatively quick and easy turbidity measurements to develop a site-specific correlation. Once satisfactorily established, the correlation can be used to estimate TSS from more frequently made turbidity measurements, saving time and effort. Because turbidity readings are somewhat dependent on particle size, shape, and color, this approach requires calculating a correlation equation for each location. Further, situations or conditions that tend to suspend larger particles through water motion (e.g., increase in a stream current or wave action) can produce higher values of TSS not necessarily accompanied by a corresponding increase in turbidity. This is because particles above a certain size (essentially anything larger than silt) are not measured by a bench turbidity meter (they settle out before the reading is taken), but contribute substantially to the TSS value.

== Definition problems ==
Although TSS appears to be a straightforward measure of particulate weight obtained by separating particles from a water sample using a filter, it suffers as a defined quantity from the fact that particles occur in nature in essentially a continuum of sizes. At the lower end, TSS relies on a cut-off established by properties of the filter being used. At the upper end, the cut-off should be the exclusion of all particulates too large to be "suspended" in water. However, this is not a fixed particle size but is dependent upon the energetics of the situation at the time of sampling: moving water suspends larger particles than does still water. Usually it is the case that the additional suspended material caused by the movement of the water is of interest.

These problems in no way invalidate the use of TSS; consistency in method and technique can overcome short-comings in most cases. But comparisons between studies may require a careful review of the methodologies used to establish that the studies are in fact measuring the same thing.

TSS in mg/L can be calculated as:

(dry weight of residue and filter − dry weight of filter alone, in grams)/ mL of sample * 1,000,000

== See also ==
- Bed load – Particles in a flowing fluid that are transported along the bed
- Settleable solids – Process by which particulates move towards the bottom of a liquid and form a sediment
- Turbidity – Cloudiness of a fluid
- Volatile suspended solids – water quality measure
- Water pollution – Contamination of water bodies
- Water quality – Assessment against standards for use
