= Mound system =

Engineered drain field for treating wastewater

A mound system is an engineered drain field for treating wastewater in places with limited access to multi-stage wastewater treatment systems. Mound systems are an alternative to the traditional rural septic system drain field. They are used in areas where septic systems are prone to failure from extremely permeable or impermeable soils, soil with the shallow cover over porous bedrock, and terrain that features a high water table.

== History ==
The mound system was designed in the 1930s by the North Dakota College of Agriculture. and was known as the Nodak Disposal System. In 1976, the University of Wisconsin studied the design of mound systems as part of the university's Waste Management Project. This project published the first ever design manual for identifying the appropriate site conditions and design criteria for mounds. In 2000, a new manual was released.

== Suitability ==
Mound systems are used to help purify and transport water efficiently.

Some soils are too high in permeability, allowing water to quickly pass through it, hindering purification effectiveness and allowing contamination to spread to nearby water sources or ecosystems. .

Areas of low soil permeability, such as areas with high water tables and limited soil cover over porous bedrock, can result in contaminated surface pooling.

== Design ==
The mound system includes a septic tank, a dosing chamber, and a mound. Wastes from homes are sent to the septic tank where the solid portion sinks to the bottom of the tank. Effluents are sent to a second tank called a dosing chamber, from which they are distributed to the mound at a metered rate (in doses). Wastewater is partially treated as it moves through the mound sand. Final treatment and disposal occur in the soil beneath the mound. The mound system does not allow all the effluent to enter the mound at once, accordingly allowing it to clean the effluent more effectively and helping keep the system from failing.

The absorption mound is built in layers. The layer depths are determined by the depth of the limiting layer of the soil, which may be a seasonal water table, bedrock, fragrant, or glacial till. Standards created by Ohio State University state that 24 inches of soil should be above the limiting layer in the soil. A 24-inch layer of specifically sized sand is placed on top of the soil. The distribution pipes that are fed by the dosing chamber are placed on top of the sand in gravel. Then construction fabric and additional soil are placed on top of the gravel to help keep the pipes from freezing. The top layer of soil also allows the mound to be planted with grass or non-woody plants to control erosion

The primary waste liquids cleaning and purification actions in a drain field are performed by a biofilm in the loose fill surrounding the perforated drain tile. If the soil permeability is too low, the liquid is not absorbed fast enough. If the soil permeability is too high or is exposed to fractured bedrock, the wastewater reaches the water table before the biofilm has time to purify the water, contaminating the aquifer. In either situation, the mound system provides an ideal habitat for the biofilm and has the correct permeability to assure slow absorption of effluent into the mound before exiting as purified water into the surrounding environment.

When installing a mound system, the soil in the area where the mound is to be placed will be compacted or disturbed. Any trees that in the mound area are cut away, and the roots and stumps retained. The surface of the area for the mound is then roughened with a chisel plow. This prepares the area for the sand. Work is done from upslope of the mound area so that the ground downslope of the mound does not get compacted. Tyler tables are used to help determine the mound size.

Time dosing is another important aspect of the functioning of the mound system. Short frequent doses of effluent onto sand filters with orifices that are closely spaced helps to improve effluent quality. By contrast, demand dosing releases large amounts of effluent at once, which rapidly passes through the sand. This does not give the biota the proper amount of time to clean the effluent.

== See also ==
- Blackwater
- Biofilter (also called a Trickle filter)
- Bioreactor
- Cesspit
- Drain-waste-vent system
- Ecological sanitation
- Grease interceptor
- Latrine
- Composting toilet
- Outhouse
- Percolation test (for the capacity of soil to absorb water)
- Pit toilet
- Plumber
- Plumbing
  - Potable cold and hot water supply
  - Traps, drains, and vents
  - Rainwater, surface, and subsurface water drainage
  - Fuel gas piping
- Sepsis
- Septage
- Sewage treatment
- Sewer
- Waste disposal
- Wastewater
