= Vermifilter =

Aerobic treatment system, consisting of a biological reactor containing media

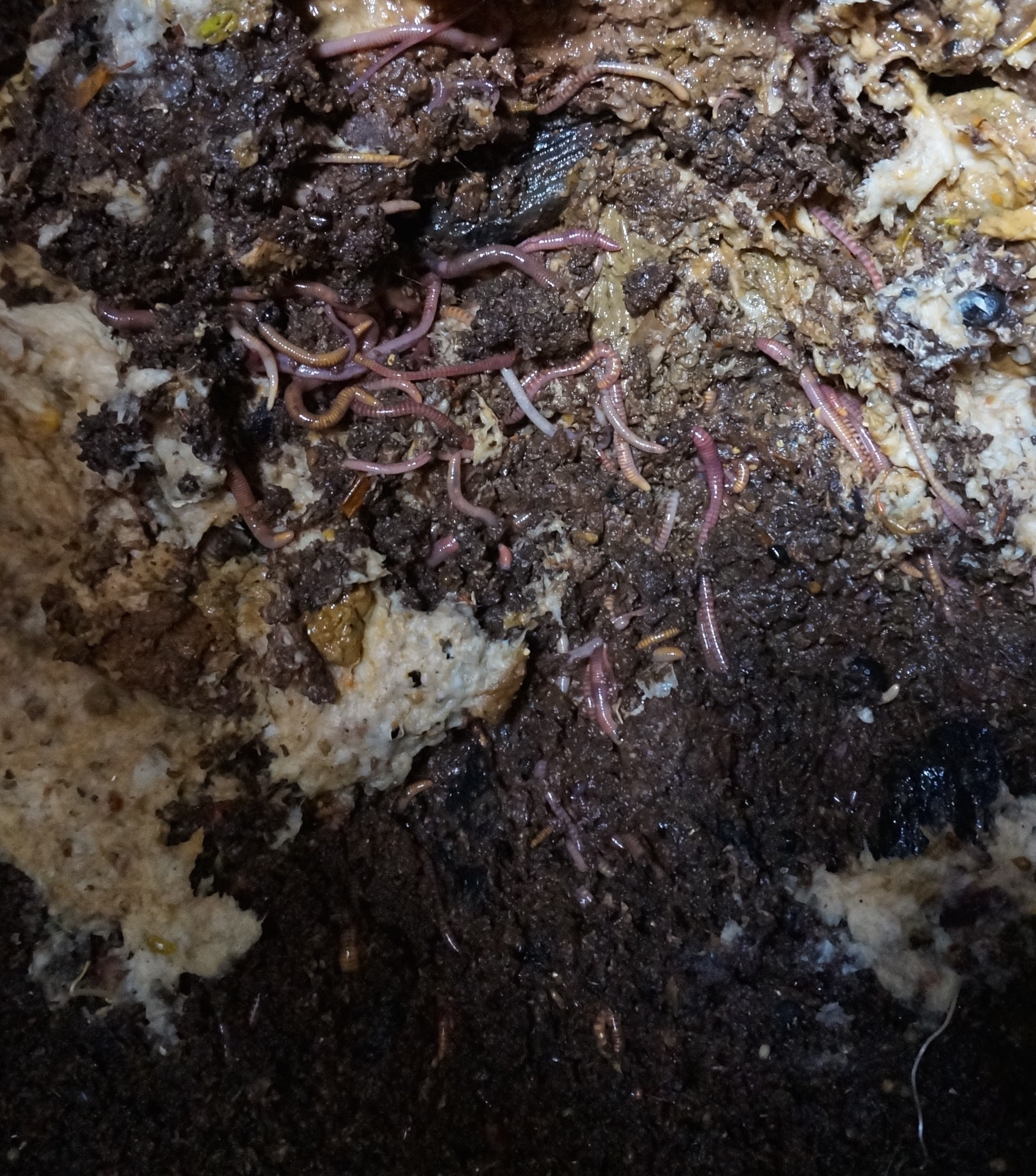
Domestic sewage vermifilter showing accumulated contents (composting worms exposed)

A vermifilter (also vermi-digester or lumbrifilter) is an aerobic treatment system, consisting of a biological reactor containing media that filters organic material from wastewater. The media also provides a habitat for aerobic bacteria and composting earthworms that purify the wastewater by removing pathogens and oxygen demand. The "trickling action" of the wastewater through the media dissolves oxygen into the wastewater, ensuring the treatment environment is aerobic for rapid decomposition of organic substances.

Vermifilters are most commonly used for sewage treatment and for agro-industrial wastewater treatment. Vermifilters can be used for primary, secondary and tertiary treatment of sewage, including blackwater and greywater in on-site systems and municipal wastewater in large centralised systems.

Vermifilters are used where wastewater requires treatment before it is discharged into the environment. Solid material (such as fecal matter and toilet paper) is retained, de-watered and digested by bacteria and earthworms into humus that is integrated into the filtration media. The liquid passes through the filtration media where the attached organisms biodegrade pathogens and other organic compounds, treating the wastewater.

Vermifiltration is a low-cost aerobic wastewater treatment option. Because energy is not required for aeration, vermifilters qualify as passive treatment systems (pumps may be required if gravity flow is not possible). Another advantage is the treatment efficiency in limited space.

== Terminology ==
Alternative terms used to describe the vermifiltration process include aerobic biodigester, biological filter with earthworms, or wet vermicomposting. The treatment system may be described using terms such as vermi-digester and vermi-trickling filter.

When this kind of sanitation system is used to treat only the mixture of excreta and water from flush toilets or pour-flush toilets (called blackwater) then the term "toilet" is added to the process name, such as vermifilter toilet.

== History ==
Vermifiltration was first proposed by researchers at the University of Chile in 1992.

A 2017 study treated municipal wastewater in a vermifilter, removal ratios for biochemical oxygen demand (BOD_{5}) were 90%, chemical oxygen demand (COD) 85%, total suspended solids (TSS) 98%, ammonia nitrogen 75% and fecal coliforms eliminated to a level that met World Health Organisation guidelines for safe use in crops.

Vermifilters offer treatment performance similar to conventional decentralised wastewater treatment systems, but with potentially higher hydraulic processing capacities.

Vermifilters are a type of biofilter or trickling filter that adds earthworms to improve treatment efficiency. Vermifilters provide an aerobic environment and wet substrate that facilitates microorganism growth as a biofilm. Microorganisms biochemically degrade organic matter present in wastewater. Earthworms regulate microbial biomass and activity by directly or/and indirectly grazing on microorganisms. Biofilm and organic matter consumed by composting earthworms is then digested into biologically inert castings (humus). The vermicast is incorporated into the media substrate, slowly increasing its volume. It can be removed and used as a soil amendment to improve fertility and structure.

Microorganisms present are heterotrophic and autotrophic. Heterotrophic microorganisms are important in oxidising carbon (decomposition), whereas autotrophic microorganisms are important in nitrification.

As a result of oxidation reactions, biodegradation, and microbial stimulation by enzymatic action, organic matter decomposition and pathogen destruction occurs in the vermifilter.

== Process types ==
Vermifilters can be used for primary, secondary and tertiary treatment of blackwater and greywater.

=== Primary blackwater treatment ===
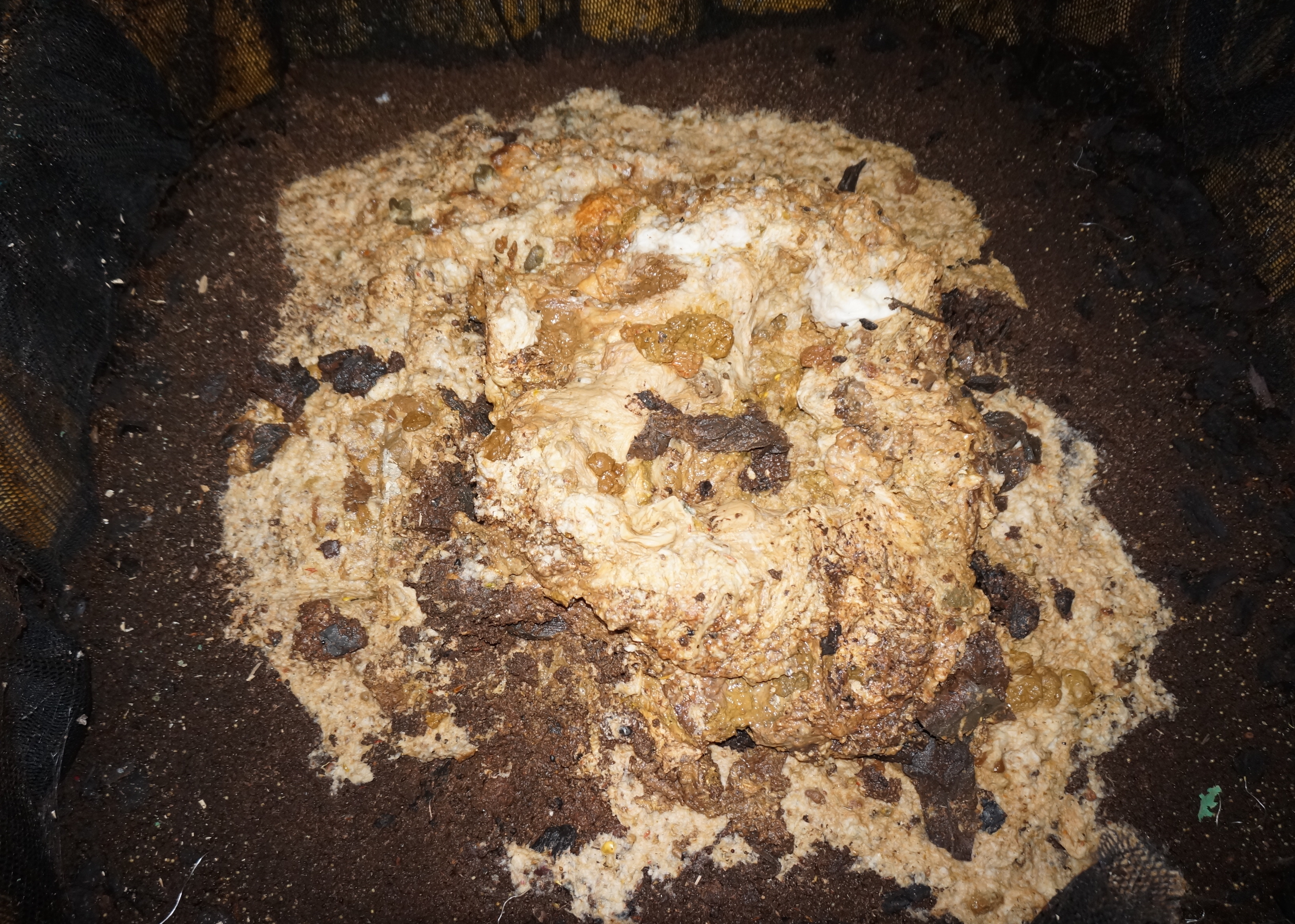
Primary treatment domestic vermifilter with solids pile on surface (comprising feces and toilet paper) sitting on vermicast humus substrate (1m^{2} surface area)

Vermifilters can be used for aerobic primary treatment. Untreated blackwater enters a ventilated enclosure above a bed of filter medium. Solids accumulate on the surface of the filter bed while liquid drains through the filter medium and exits the reactor. Solids (feces and toilet paper) are aerobically digested by aerobic bacteria and composting earthworms into castings (humus), thereby significantly reducing the volume of organic material.

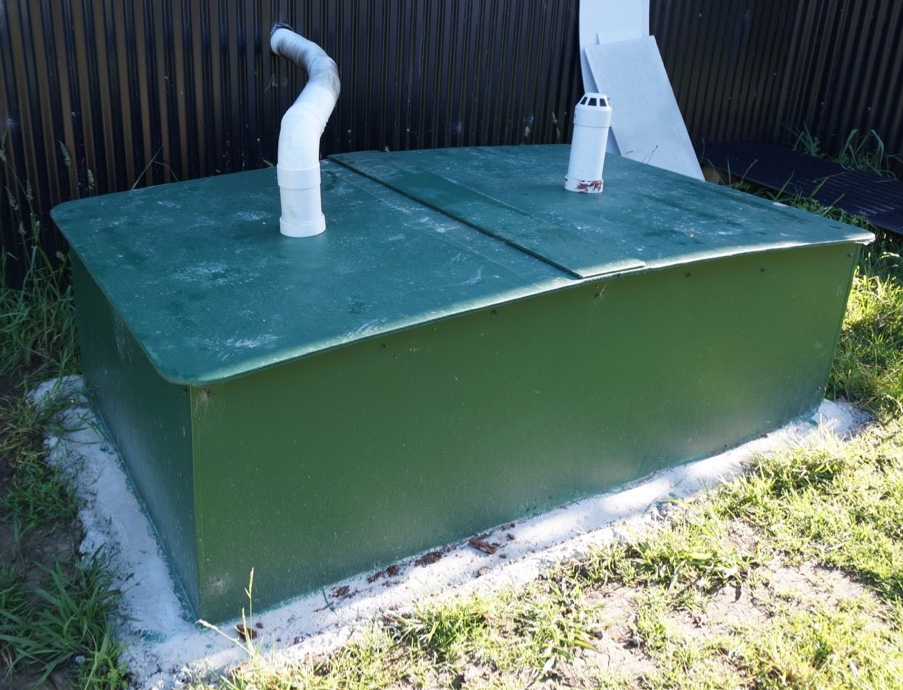
Twin chamber constructed primary treatment vermifilter fed by a domestic flush toilet

Primary treatment vermifilter reactors are designed to digest solid material, such as contained in raw sewage. Twin-chamber parallel reactors offer the advantage of being able to allow one to rest, while the other is active, in order to facilitate hygienic humus removal.

Worms digest the solid organic material. Over time, an equilibrium is reached in which the volume digested by a stable population of worms is equal to the input volume of solid waste. Seasonal and environmental factors (such as temperature) and variable influent volumes can cause solid waste buildup as a pile.

Although ambient oxygen cannot the centre of this (wet) compost pile, worms work from the outside in and introduce air as necessary to meet their nutritional requirements. This food buffer provides a level of resilience and reliability, provided space is provided for a pile to develop. The wet environment may facilitate digestion of solid waste by worms. The volume of vermicast humus increases only slowly and occasionally needs to be removed from the primary treatment reactor.

Treatable blackwater can include greywater containing food solids, grease and other biodegradable waste. Solid material is reduced to stable humus (worm castings), with volume reductions of up to tenfold.

The process produces primary treated blackwater, removing much of the solid organic material. Because liquid effluent is discharged almost immediately on entering the digester, little dissolved oxygen is consumed through the filtration stage. However, oxygen demand leaches into the wastewater flow through the filter as worms digest the retained solids. This oxygen demand can be removed with secondary treatment vermifilter reactors. Primary treatment vermifilters provide a similar level of liquid effluent treatment to a septic tank, but in less time because solid digestion by worms takes place more rapidly in an aerobic environment.

The liquid effluent is either discharged directly to a drain field or undergoes secondary treatment.

=== Secondary treatment ===
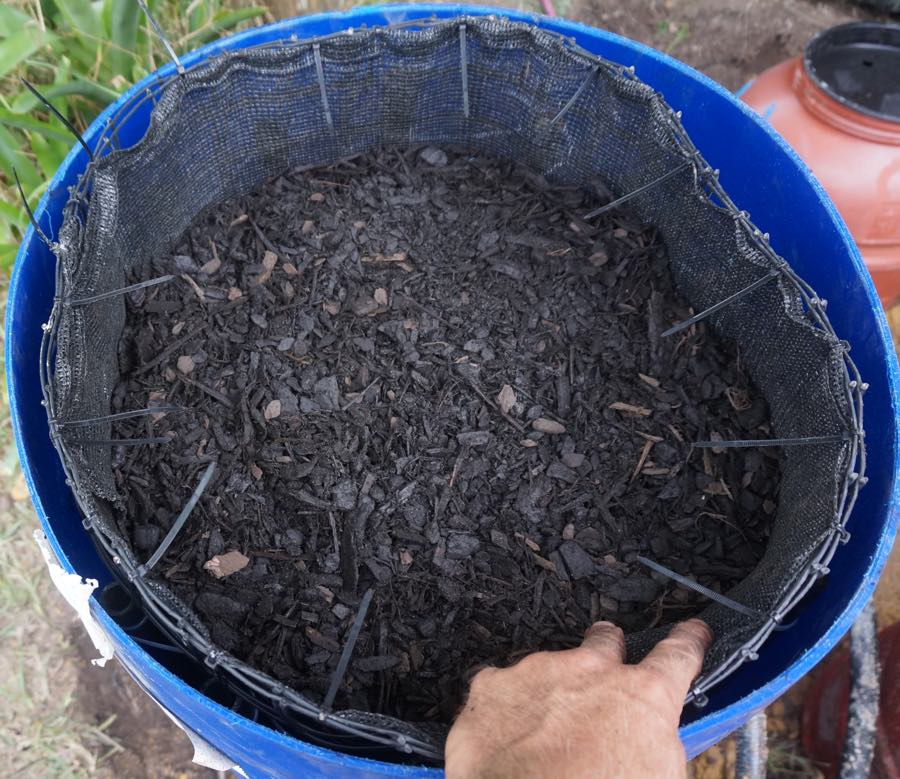
Secondary treatment domestic vermifilter for wastewater showing ventilation around basket and pine bark media

Secondary and tertiary treatment vermifilters can be stacked underneath the primary vermifilter in a single tower, but are typically separate. Multiple reactors can be chained in series. Drainage within the reactor is provided by filter media packed according to the hydraulic conductivity and permeability of each filtration media. The filter retains the solid particles, increases the hydraulic retention time and provides a suitable habitat for sustaining composting earthworms. This population requires adequate moisture levels within the filter media, along with adequate drainage and oxygen.

Sprinklers or drippers can be used in secondary and tertiary treatment vermifilter reactors (see image).

Hydraulic factors (hydraulic retention time, hydraulic loading rate and organic loading rate) and biological factors (earthworm numbers, levels of biofilm) influence treatment efficiency.

== Design ==
Vermifilter reactors are made from durable materials that exclude vermin such as plastic or concrete. Ventilation must be sufficient to ensure an aerobic environment, while also excluding flies. Temperature within the reactor needs to be maintained within a range suitable for the worms and microorganisms.

Design parameters include stocking density of earthworms (over time earthworm population tends to self-moderate), filter media composition, hydraulic loading rate, hydraulic retention time and organic loading rate. Hydraulic retention time and hydraulic loading rate both affect effluent quality. Hydraulic retention time is the actual time the wastewater is in contact with the filter media and is related to the depth of the vermifilter (which may increase over time due to the accumulation of earthworm vermicastings), reactor volume and type of material used (porosity). The hydraulic retention time determines wastewater inflow rate (hydraulic loading as influent volume per hour).

=== Influent ===
Influent enters from above the filter media. Side entry is possible for full-flush toilets, while micro-flush toilets do not provide sufficient water to convey solids through sewer pipes and generally are installed directly above the reactor. Primary treatment reactors must provide sufficient vertical space for growth of the pile. This is dependent on the volume of influent solids and the presence of slower decomposing materials such as toilet paper. Secondary and tertiary treatment reactors can use sprinklers or tricklers to distribute the influent wastewater evenly over the filter media to improve treatment efficiency of the filter media.

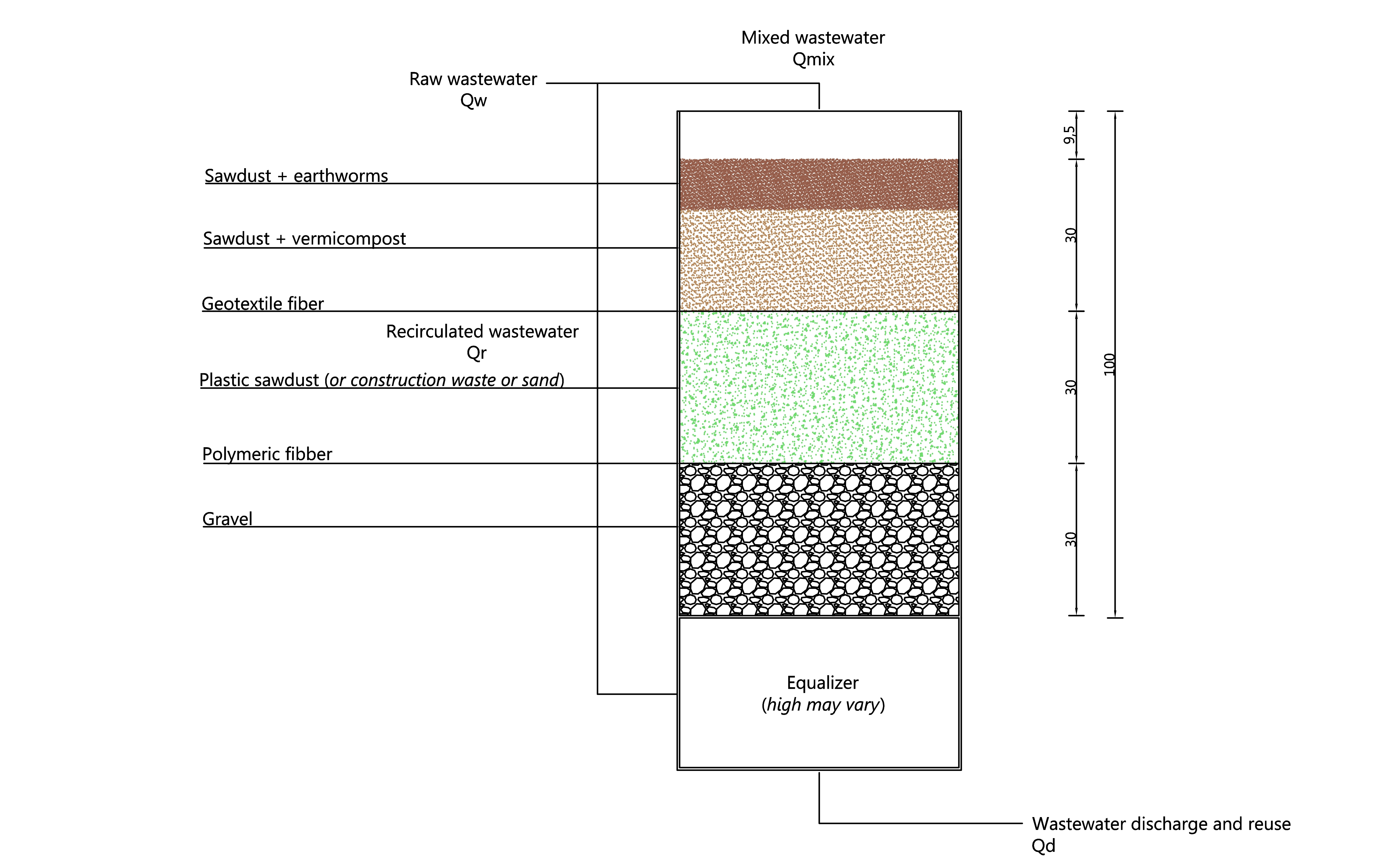
Another example. Note the use here of geomembranes or other synthetic cloths to separate layers.

=== Filter substrate ===
Drainage within the vermifilter reactor is provided by the filter media. The filter media has the dual purpose of retaining the solid organic material, while also providing a habitat suitable for sustaining composting worms. This population requires adequate moisture levels within the media, along with good drainage and aerobic conditions.

Vermifilter reactors may comprise a single section packed only with organic media, or up to three filter sections comprising an organic top layer that provides habitat for the earthworms, an inorganic upper layer of sand and lower layer of gravel. The filter sits on top of a sump or drainage layer of coarse gravel, rocks or pervious plastic drainage coil where the treated effluent is discharged and/or recirculated to the top of the reactor. Alternatively the filter media may be suspended above the sump in a basket. Synthetic geotextile is sometimes used to retain the filter media in place above the drainage layer. To remain aerobic, adequate ventilation must be provided, along with an outlet for the liquid effluent to drain away.

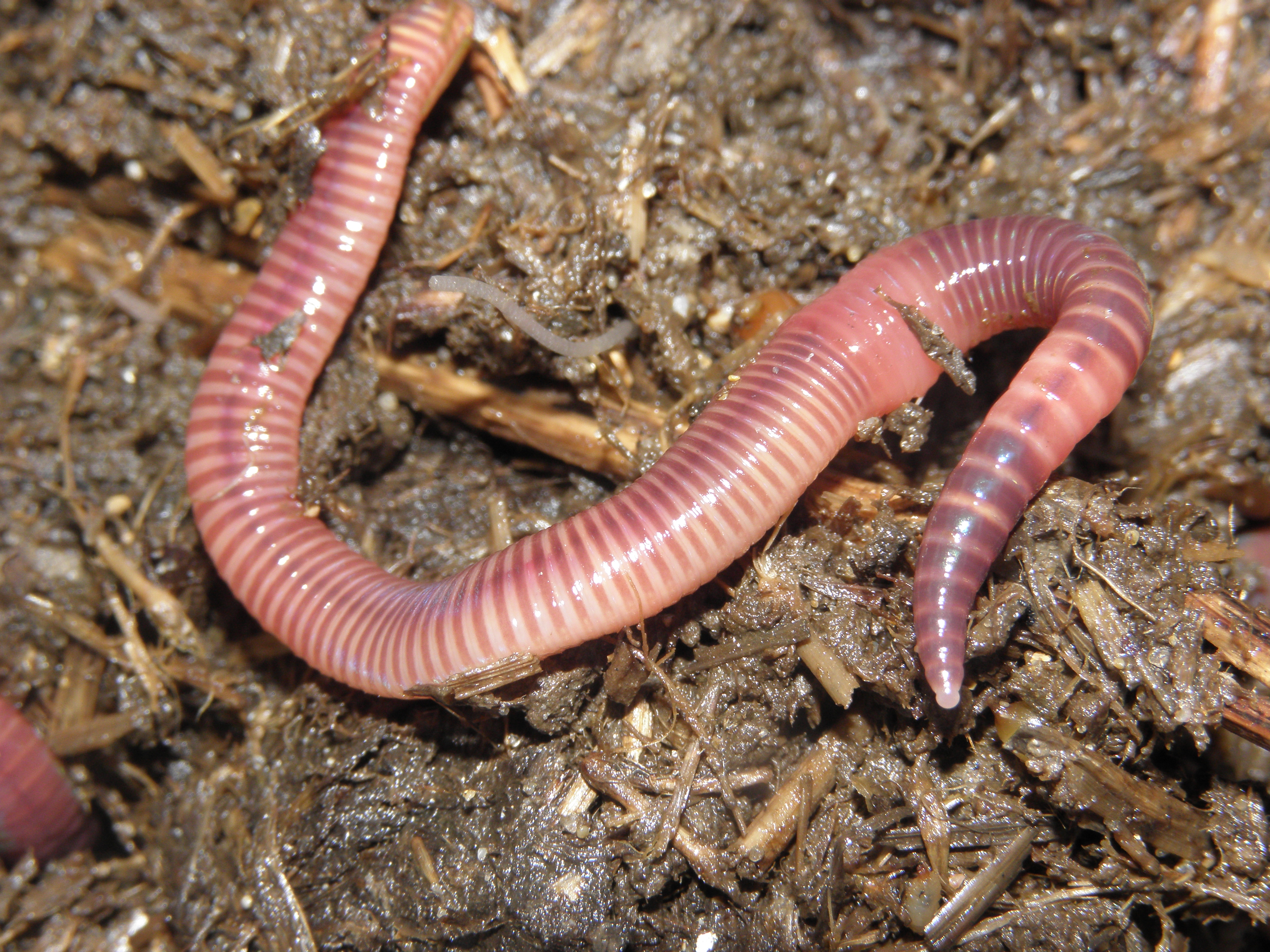
Different species of composting worms may be used, including Eisenia foetida.

Common filter packing materials include sawdust, wood chips, coir, bark, peat, and straw for the organic layer. Gravel, quartz sand, round stones, pumice, mud balls, glass balls, ceramsite and charcoal are commonly used for the inorganic layer. The surface area and porosity of these filter materials influence treatment performance. Materials with low granulometry (small particles) and large surface area may improve vermifilter performance, but impede its drainage.

== Sizing ==
Vermifilters can be constructed as single tower systems, or separate staged reactors (either gravity or pump operated) for the treatment of wastewater according to design requirements (primary, secondary, tertiary treatment). More stages can increase the degree of treatment because multiple stage systems provide accumulating aerobic conditions suitable for nitrification of ammonium and removal of chemical oxygen demand (COD).

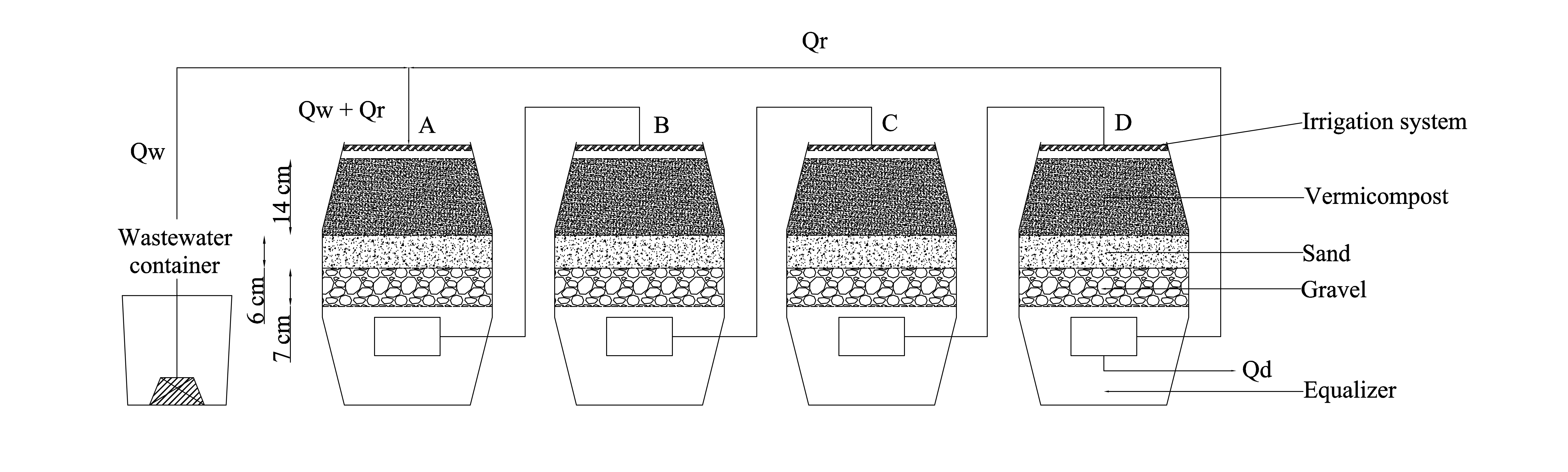
For a higher degree of treatment, vermifilters may be arranged in series. (Q_{r} should go back to the original wastewater tank.)

In principle, the longer the wastewater remains inside the filter, the greater the BOD_{5} and COD removal, but at the expense of hydraulic loading. Wastewater requires sufficient contact time with the biofilm to allow to adsorb, transform, and reduce contaminants.

The hydraulic loading rate is an essential design parameter, consisting of the volume of wastewater that a vermifilter can reasonably treat per unit time. For a given system, higher hydraulic loading rates decreases hydraulic retention time and therefore reduces level of treatment. Hydraulic loading rate depends on parameters such as structure, effluent quality and bulk density of filter packing, along with method of application. Hydraulic loading rates commonly vary between 0.2-3.0 m^{3}m^{−2}day^{−1} or 10–20 g L^{−1}.

Common hydraulic retention time values range from 1 to 3 hours. Organic loading rate is defined as the amount of soluble and particulate organic matter (as BOD_{5}) per unit area per unit time.

Treatment efficiency is influenced by health, maturity, and earthworm abundance. Results are typically reported in grams or number of individuals per volume or surface area of filter packing. Common densities vary between 10 g L^{−1} and 40 g L^{−1} of filter packing material.

An abundance of earthworms improves treatment efficiency, in particular BOD_{5}, total suspended solids and NH_{4}^{+} removal. This is because earthworms release organic matter into the filter media and stimulate nitrogen mineralization. Earthworm castings may have substances that contribute to higher BOD_{5} removal.

== Maintenance ==
A vermifilter has few manual maintenance requirements. Gravity operated units require no energy input. Recirculation, if required for improved effluent quality, requires a pump.

Organic materials must be supplemented as materials decompose and reduce in volume. Worm casting volume increases and must be removed from the vermifilter.

== Examples ==
- Construction of primary and secondary domestic vermifilters from readily available materials
- The "Tiger Toilet" is a household pour-flush toilet that provides primary vermifiltration and releases effluent into the soil below. It has been tested by Bear Valley Ventures and Primove Infrastructure Development Consultants in rural India. Unlike a pit latrine, virtually no fecal material accumulated over a one-year period. The effluent featured a 99% reduction in fecal coliforms . User satisfaction is high, driven by a lack of odour. This system is marketed commercially in India, where over 2000 had been sold and installed by May 2017.
- "Tiger worm toilets" are promoted by Oxfam in refugee camps, slums, and peri-urban areas in Africa, such as Liberia.
- Ghana Sustainable Aid Project ( GSAP) markets low-flush vermifilter toilet systems with direct subsoil soakage in Ghana and other African countries with support by Providence College and the University of Ghana.
- Biofilcom is marketing its "Biofil Digester" in Ghana.
- In Australia and New Zealand, suppliers include Wormfarm, Zenplumb, Naturalflow, SWWSNZ and Autoflow offer vermifilters for domestic greywater/blackwater treatment, disposing primary treated effluent in subsurface leach fields.
- Vermifilter toilet

== See also ==
- Composting toilet
- List of wastewater treatment technologies
- Sanitation
- Trickling filter
- Urine-diverting dry toilet
- Ecological sanitation
- Reuse of excreta
