= Multrum =

A multrum is a Swedish word (not in the Oxford English Dictionary) for a large composting vessel, predominantly meant to decompose toilet excreta but also other organic residue. It is a composite of the Swedish words "multna" (moldering or composting) and "rum" (room). A multrum has over several decades become a noun and has come to mean any large composting chamber connected to a toilet. In Scandinavia there are many brands of composting toilet multrums, including Mullis, CompostEra, and Clivus Multrum.
