= Aerobic treatment system =

Sewage treatment process

An aerobic treatment system (ATS), often called an aerobic septic system, is a small scale sewage treatment system similar to a septic tank system, but which uses an aerobic process for digestion rather than just the anaerobic process used in septic systems. These systems are commonly found in rural areas where public sewers are not available, and may be used for a single residence or for a small group of homes.

Unlike the traditional septic system, the aerobic treatment system produces a high quality secondary effluent, which can be sterilized and used for surface irrigation. This allows much greater flexibility in the placement of the leach field, as well as cutting the required size of the leach field by as much as half.

== Process ==
The ATS process generally consists of the following phases:

- Pre-treatment stage to remove large solids and other undesirable substances.
- Aeration stage, where aerobic bacteria digest biological wastes.
- Settling stage allows undigested solids to settle. This forms a sludge that must be periodically removed from the system.
- Disinfecting stage, where chlorine or similar disinfectant is mixed with the water, to produce an antiseptic output. Another option is UV disinfection, where the water is exposed to UV light inside of a UV disinfection unit.

The disinfecting stage is optional, and is used where a sterile effluent is required, such as cases where the effluent is distributed above ground. The disinfectant typically used is tablets of calcium hypochlorite, which are specially made for waste treatment systems. The tablets are intended to break down quickly in sunlight. Stabilized forms of chlorine persist after the effluent is dispersed, and can kill plants in the leach field.

Since the ATS contains a living ecosystem of microbes to digest the waste products in the water, excessive amounts of items such as bleach or antibiotics can damage the ATS environment and reduce treatment effectiveness. Non-digestible items should also be avoided, as they will build up in the system and require more frequent sludge removal.

== Types of aerobic treatment systems ==
Small scale aerobic systems generally use one of two designs, fixed-film systems, or continuous flow, suspended growth aerobic systems (CFSGAS). The pre-treatment and effluent handling are similar for both types of systems, and the difference lies in the aeration stage.

=== Fixed film systems ===
Fixed film systems use a porous medium which provides a bed to support the biomass film that digests the waste material in the wastewater. Designs for fixed film systems vary widely, but fall into two basic categories (though some systems may combine both methods). The first is a system where the medium is moved relative to the wastewater, alternately immersing the film and exposing it to air, while the second uses a stationary medium, and varies the wastewater flow so the film is alternately submerged and exposed to air. In both cases, the biomass must be exposed to both wastewater and air for the aerobic digestion to occur. The film itself may be made of any suitable porous material, such as formed plastic or peat moss. Simple systems use stationary media, and rely on intermittent, gravity driven wastewater flow to provide periodic exposure to air and wastewater. A common moving media system is the rotating biological contactor (RBC), which uses disks rotating slowly on a horizontal shaft. Nearly 40 percent of the disks are submerged at any given time, and the shaft rotates at a rate of one or two revolutions per minute.

=== Continuous flow, suspended growth aerobic systems ===
CFSGAS systems, as the name implies, are designed to handle continuous flow, and do not provide a bed for a bacterial film, relying rather on bacteria suspended in the wastewater. The suspension and aeration are typically provided by an air pump, which pumps air through the aeration chamber, providing a constant stirring of the wastewater in addition to the oxygenation. A medium to promote fixed film bacterial growth may be added to some systems designed to handle higher than normal levels of biomass in the wastewater.

=== Retrofit or portable aerobic systems ===
Another increasingly common use of aerobic treatment is for the remediation of failing or failed anaerobic septic systems, by retrofitting an existing system with an aerobic feature. This class of product, known as aerobic remediation, is designed to remediate biologically failed and failing anaerobic distribution systems by significantly reducing the biochemical oxygen demand (BOD5) and total suspended solids (TSS) of the effluent. The reduction of the BOD5 and TSS reverses the developed bio-mat. Further, effluent with high dissolved oxygen and aerobic bacteria flow to the distribution component and digest the bio-mat.

=== Composting toilets ===
Composting toilets are designed to treat only toilet waste, rather than general residential waste water, and are typically used with water-free toilets rather than the flush toilets associated with the above types of aerobic treatment systems. These systems treat the waste as a moist solid, rather than in liquid suspension, and therefore separate urine from feces during treatment to maintain the correct moisture content in the system. An example of a composting toilet is the clivus multrum (Latin for 'inclined chamber'), which consists of an inclined chamber that separates urine and feces and a fan to provide positive ventilation and prevent odors from escaping through the toilet. Within the chamber, the urine and feces are independently broken down not only by aerobic bacteria, but also by fungi, arthropods, and earthworms. Treatment times are very long, with a minimum time between removals of solid waste of a year; during treatment the volume of the solid waste is decreased by 90 percent, with most being converted into water vapor and carbon dioxide. Pathogens are eliminated from the waste by the long durations in inhospitable conditions in the treatment chamber.

== Comparison to traditional septic systems ==
The aeration stage and the disinfecting stage are the primary differences from a traditional septic system; in fact, an aerobic treatment system can be used as a secondary treatment for septic tank effluent. These stages increase the initial cost of the aerobic system, and also the maintenance requirements over the passive septic system. Unlike many other biofilters, aerobic treatment systems require a constant supply of electricity to drive the air pump increasing overall system costs. The disinfectant tablets must be periodically replaced, as well as the electrical components (air compressor) and mechanical components (air diffusers). On the positive side, an aerobic system produces a higher quality effluent than a septic tank, and thus the leach field can be smaller than that of a conventional septic system, and the output can be discharged in areas too environmentally sensitive for septic system output. Some aerobic systems recycle the effluent through a sprinkler system, using it to water the lawn where regulations approve.

=== Effluent quality ===
Since the effluent from an ATS is often discharged onto the surface of the leach field, the quality is very important. A typical ATS will, when operating correctly, produce an effluent with less than 30 mg/liter BOD5, 25 mg/L TSS, and 10,000 cfu/mL fecal coliform bacteria. This is clean enough that it cannot support a biomat or "slime" layer like a septic tank.

ATS effluent is relatively odorless; a properly operating system will produce effluent that smells musty, but not like sewage. Aerobic treatment is so effective at reducing odors, that it is the preferred method for reducing odor from manure produced by farms.

== See also ==
- List of waste-water treatment technologies
