= Trickling filter =

Type of wastewater treatment system with a fixed bed of rocks or similar

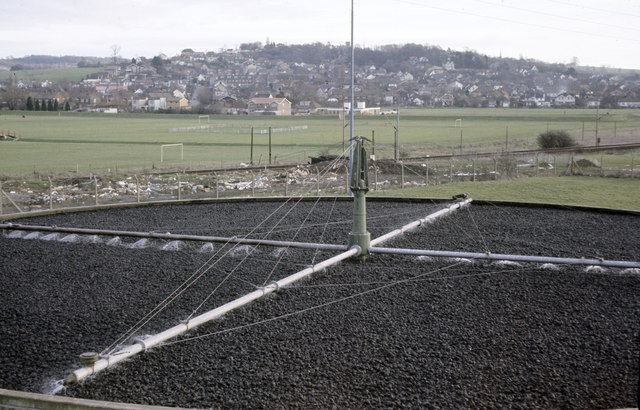
A trickling filter plant in the United Kingdom: The effluent from the primary settling tanks is sprayed onto a bed of coarse gravel (Benfleet Sewage Treatment Plant)

A trickling filter is a type of wastewater treatment system. It consists of a fixed bed of some material, such as rocks, coke, gravel, slag, polyurethane foam, sphagnum peat moss, ceramic, or plastic media, over which sewage or other wastewater flows downward and causes a layer of microbial slime (biofilm) to grow, covering the bed of media. Aerobic conditions are maintained by splashing, diffusion, and either by forced-air flowing through the bed or natural convection of air if the filter medium is porous. The treatment of sewage or other wastewater with trickling filters is among the oldest and most well characterized treatment technologies.

The fundamental components of a complete trickling filter system are:

- a bed of filter medium upon which a layer of microbial slime is promoted and developed;
- an enclosure or a container which houses the bed of filter medium;
- a system for distributing the flow of wastewater over the filter medium; and
- a system for removing and disposing of any sludge from the treated effluent.

The terms trickle filter, trickling biofilter, biofilter, biological filter and biological trickling filter are often used to refer to a trickling filter. These systems have also been described as roughing filters, intermittent filters, packed media bed filters, alternative septic systems, percolating filters, attached growth processes, and fixed film processes.

== Process description ==
A typical complete trickling filter system

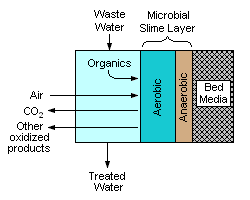
Image 1. A schematic cross-section of the contact face of the bed of media in a trickling filter

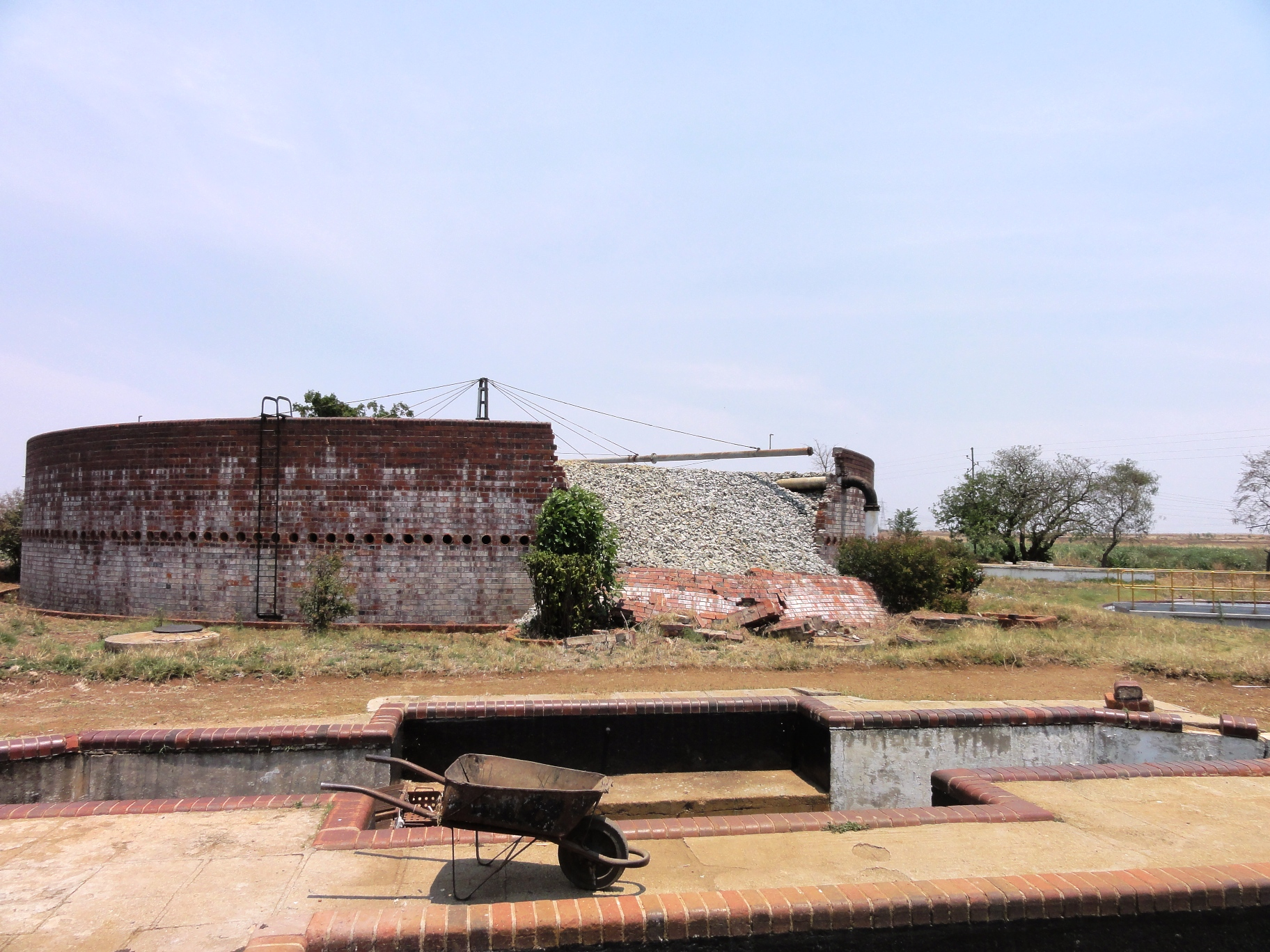
Broken trickling filter unit at the sewage treatment plant in Norton, Zimbabwe, showing importance of maintenance to prevent structural failure

Typically, settled sewage flow enters at a high level and flows through the primary settlement tank. The supernatant from the tank flows into a dosing device, often a tipping bucket which delivers flow to the arms of the filter. The flush of water flows through the arms and exits through a series of holes pointing at an angle downwards. This propels the arms around distributing the liquid evenly over the surface of the filter media. Most are uncovered (unlike the accompanying diagram) and are freely ventilated to the atmosphere.

The removal of pollutants from the waste water stream involves both absorption and adsorption of organic compounds and some inorganic species (such as nitrite and nitrate ions) by the layer of microbial biofilm. The filter media is typically chosen to provide a very high surface-to-volume ratio. Typical materials are often porous and have considerable internal surface area, in addition to the external surface of the medium. Passage of the wastewater over the media provides dissolved oxygen, which the biofilm layer requires for the biochemical oxidation of the organic compounds and releases carbon dioxide gas, water and other oxidized end products. As the biofilm layer thickens, it eventually sloughs off into the liquid flow and subsequently forms part of the secondary sludge. Typically, a trickling filter is followed by a clarifier or sedimentation tank for the separation and removal of the sloughed film. Filters utilizing higher-density media, such as sand, foam and peat moss do not produce a sludge that must be removed, but may require forced air blowers, backwashing, and/or an enclosed anaerobic environment.

=== Biofilm ===
The biofilm that develops in a trickling filter may become several millimetres thick and is typically a gelatinous matrix that may contain many species of bacteria, ciliates and amoeboid protozoa, annelids, round worms, insect larvae, other microfauna. (If annelids are abundant, the filter may be considered a vermifilter.) This is very different from many other biofilms, which may be less than 1 mm thick. Within the biofilm, both aerobic and anaerobic zones can exist supporting both oxidative and reductive biological processes. At certain times of year, especially in the spring, rapid growth of organisms in the film may cause the film to be too thick and it may slough off in patches leading to the "spring slough".

== Design considerations ==
A typical trickling filter is circular and between 10 metres and 20 metres across and between 2 metres to 3 metres deep. A circular wall, often of brick, contains a bed of filter media which in turn rests on a base of under-drains. These under-drains function both to remove liquid passing through the filter media but also to allow the free passage of air up through the filter media. Mounted in the center over the top of the filter media is a spindle supporting two or more horizontal perforated pipes which extend to the edge of the media. The perforations on the pipes are designed to allow an even flow of liquid over the whole area of the media and are also angled so that when liquid flows from the pipes the whole assembly rotates around the central spindle. Settled sewage is delivered to a reservoir at the centre of the spindle via some form of dosing mechanism, often a tipping bucket device on small filters.

Larger filters may be rectangular and the distribution arms may be driven by hydraulic or electrical systems.

== Types ==
Single trickling filters may be used for the treatment of small residential septic tank discharges and very small rural sewage treatment systems. Larger centralized sewage treatment plants typically use many trickling filters in parallel.

Systems can be configured for single-pass use where the treated water is applied to the trickling filter once before being disposed of, or for multi-pass use where a portion of the treated water is cycled back and re-treated via a closed loop. Multi-pass systems result in higher treatment quality and assist in removing Total Nitrogen (TN) levels by promoting nitrification in the aerobic media bed and denitrification in the anaerobic septic tank. Some systems use the filters in two banks operated in series so that the wastewater has two passes through a filter with a sedimentation stage between the two passes. Every few days the filters are switched round to balance the load. This method of treatment can improve nitrification and de-nitrification since much of the carbonaceous oxidative material is removed on the first pass through the filters.

=== Media types ===
Trickling may have a variety of types of filter media used to support the biofilm. Types of media most commonly used include coke, pumice, plastic matrix material, open-cell polyurethane foam, clinker, gravel, sand and geotextiles. Ideal filter medium optimizes surface area for microbial attachment, wastewater retention time, allows air flow, resists plugging, is mechanically robust in all weathers allowing walking access across the filter, and does not degrade. Some residential systems require forced aeration units which will increase maintenance and operational costs.

Synthetic filter media may pose a significant risk of flammability as demonstrated in Christchurch, New Zealand in May 2022 when two large trickling filters filled with plastic filter bales caught fire. The resultant smell had a significant impact on many city residents and this event put out of action a significant proportion of the sewage treatment capacity.

=== Industrial wastewater treatment ===
The treatment of industrial wastewater may involve specialized trickling filters which use plastic media and high flow rates. Wastewater from a variety of industrial processes have been treated in trickling filters. Such industrial wastewater trickling filters consist of two types:

- Large tanks or concrete enclosures filled with plastic packing or other media.
- Vertical towers filled with plastic packing or other media.

The availability of inexpensive plastic tower packings has led to their use as trickling filter beds in tall towers, some as high as 20 meters. As early as the 1960s, such towers were in use at: the Great Northern Oil's Pine Bend Refinery in Minnesota; the Cities Service Oil Company Trafalgar Refinery in Oakville, Ontario and at a kraft paper mill.

The treated water effluent from industrial wastewater trickling filters is typically processed in a clarifier to remove the sludge that sloughs off the microbial slime layer attached to the trickling filter media as for other trickling filter applications.

Some of the latest trickle filter technology involves aerated biofilters of plastic media in vessels using blowers to inject air at the bottom of the vessels, with either downflow or upflow of the wastewater.

== See also ==
- List of wastewater treatment technologies
- Rotating biological contactors
- Sand filter
- Trickle-bed reactor
- Vermifilter
