= Floating reedbeds =

Floating reedbeds are artificial or natural systems consisting of buoyancy and reeds. Plants including rice and wheat can be cultivated on floating reedbeds. The primary purpose of artificial floating reedbeds is to improve water quality through biofiltration, preventing algal blooms through denitrification and plant nutrient uptake, with a secondary benefit of habitat provision.

Modern floating reedbeds are increasingly being used by local government and land managers to improve water quality at source, reducing pollutants in surface water bodies and providing biodiversity habitat. Examples include Gold Coast City Council in Australia. Artificial floating reedbeds are commonly anchored to the shoreline or bottom of a water body, to ensure the system does not float away in a storm event or create a hazard.

Buoyancy in artificial floating reedbeds is commonly provided by polyethylene or polyurethane flotation foam, or polyethylene or PVC plastic containing air voids. Growth media includes coconut fibre, mats made of polyester or recycled PET bottles, synthetic geotechnical mat, open cell polyurethane foam, jute, soil and sand. Additional elements may be added such as activated carbon, zeolites, and materials that accumulate pollutants.
