= Brac Systems =

- Industry: Water reclamation
- Founded: February 2005; 20 years ago in Montreal, Canada
- Founder: Dennis Yasar
- Defunct: 2012
- Fate: Purchased by Greyter Water Systems
- Products: Greywater, rainwater, blackwater recycling systems
- Website: greyter.com (Greyter's website)

Brac Systems, Inc assets were acquired by Greyter Water Systems in May 2012. Brac was a company that specialized in the development of water saving products for both residential and commercial use. Brac Systems Inc. was founded by Dennis Yasar in Montreal, Quebec, in February 2005.

Brac Systems began with the development of the GRS greywater recycling systems in 2005. Later, it manufactured and marketed greywater, rainwater and blackwater recycling systems. Brac's residential greywater recycling systems (RGW Systems) capture greywater from the showers, bathtubs, lavatories and laundry washing machines after which it's redistributed to the toilets or used for irrigation. Based upon statistics from Environment Canada, the company asserted that the use of their system will cut the average home's water consumption and sewage effluent by approximately one third.

In 2007, Brac Systems was named the Best New Product in the Energy Efficiency category at Mécanex/Climatex 2007, an annual plumbing and mechanical trade show held in Montreal. Brac's recycling system was also named one of the "Top Ten Green Building Products of 2007" by Sustainable Industries Journal, a publication for the green building industry.

== News articles ==
- "Conserving Precious Water through Innovation". Built Green News. June 2006. Archived from the original on 2007-05-24.
- "City Meeting Goal With New Water-Saving Initiative". press release. City of Kelowna, BC. 2006-11-02. Archived from the original on 2010-09-22.
- Moore, Lynn (2007-01-26). "Banking on the green appeal of greywater recovery". Montreal Gazette.
- Silverman, Craig (2007-02-01). "This ain't no bric-a-brac". Hour.ca. Archived from the original on 2007-02-06.
- Ballinger, Barbara (May 2007). "Trends in Home Building & Design: Healthier Homes" (PDF). Realtor Magazine. p. 38.
- Lecompte, Celeste; Brian J. Back (August 2007). "Top 10 Green Building Products 2007 supplement". Sustainable Industries Journal. p. 13.

== See also ==
- Reclaimed water
