= Foundry Wood =

Woodland in Royal Leamington Spa, Warwickshire, England

Coordinates: 52°17′07″N 1°32′45″W

Foundry Wood is a small triangular woodland located in Leamington Spa, England. Proposals to turn the wild woodland area to a usable public space began in 2011 as part of a larger scheme to re-develop the surrounding area, following the demolition of the nearby Ford Motor Company foundry. Work began in March 2012, spearheaded by a community interest company named ARC (Achieving Results in Communities) and the woodland opened to the public in summer 2013. As well as wheelchair accessible paths being laid out there is a compost toilet, a newly created wildlife pond and an outdoor classroom for education and conservation purposes on the site. There are regular events held at the woods including art and craft sessions, nature talks, music gigs and environmental themed films.

The 2-acre (0.81 ha) wood is between two railway lines (the Chiltern Main Line and the Manchester to Bournemouth line) and is now maintained by ARC and a voluntary organisation Friends of Foundry Wood. At present there are no set opening times for the woods as the one exit and entrance is opened by volunteers, although it is open most days and times can be found on the website. In 2017 the wood was given a Green Flag Community Award which it has been awarded each year since.
