= Vermifilter toilet =

Type of a composting toilet that uses worms

Vermifilter toilet, also known as a primary vermifilter, vermidigester toilet, tiger toilet or tiger worm toilet, is an on-site sanitation system in which human excreta are delivered from a toilet (usually by flushing) onto a medium containing a worm-based ecosystem. Faecal solids are trapped on the surface of the vermifilter where digestion takes place. Liquids typically flow through drainage media, before the effluent is infiltrated into the soil.

== Description ==
A vermifilter toilet contains composting worms such as Eisenia fetida that digest human faeces, thus reducing the accumulation of solids in the system and reducing the need for frequent emptying, in comparison with pit latrines. Further, worm-based digestion is virtually complete and produces vermicompost, so emptying does not involve handling of sludge or require a specialist service. This is a key benefit to users, as is the associated lack of smells.

In field trials in rural India, chemical oxygen demand (COD) and faecal indicators were reduced by 60% and 99% respectively in the effluent.

A worm colony can live inside the vermifilter indefinitely as long as the correct environmental conditions are maintained. Worms need air, food (human faeces) and added (flush) water. An aerobic environment must be provided (e.g. ventilation), and the liquid effluent must be able to drain away. It is important to site the vermifilter correctly so that any risk of flooding is avoided.

Maintenance consists of occasionally removing the accumulated vermicompost: it is estimated that vermicompost removal will be required every 6–8 years, about one-half to one-third of the fill rate for an equivalent size of pit latrine with the same number of users. Emptying latrines can be expensive and often comes with smell and contamination issues: in long-term refugee camps vermifilter toilets reduce the need to replace filled pit latrines and are more cost-effective.

Vermifilter toilets provide primary treatment of human excreta. When properly used and maintained, they can contribute to improved sanitation management and have been considered as a low-cost option in some settings.

== Examples ==
- Bear Valley Ventures has used the brand "Tiger Toilet" for marketing their product.
- Biofilcom, and GSAP Microflush toilet secured funding from the Bill & Melinda Gates Foundation to develop vermifilter toilet technology in Africa.
- Oxfam instructs construction of brandless vermifilter toilets.
- TBF Environmental Solutions Pvt Ltd markets the "Tiger Toilet" in India
- Biofil markets a vermifilter toilet in Bangladesh and Ghana.
- Biolytix in New Zealand
- Naturalflow in New Zealand
- A&A Worm Farm Waste Systems in Australia
- Wendy Howard provides open-source plans for decentralized on-site vermifiltration septic treatment and distribution, and has been involved with promoting this technology in Portugal.
- Vermifilter.com provides low cost design options for building vermifilter toilets from readily available materials

== History ==
Anna Edey constructed a vermicomposting flush toilet in 1995, called the Solviva Biocarbon filter system. This was later adapted by Wendy Howard. Dean Cameron in Australia developed the "dowmus" vermifilter toilet in the mid-1990s which morphed into the biolytyx system. Colin Bell from New Zealand began marketing his "wormorator" in the late 1990s, a twin-chamber vermifilter toilet.

Later, attention began to focus on applications in the developing world in 2009-2012 through the Sanitation Ventures project at the London School of Hygiene and Tropical Medicine (LSHTM) funded by a grant from the Bill & Melinda Gates Foundation. This project had the goal of finding solutions to the problem of pit latrine filling: vermifilter toilets appeared to be an attractive option. Colin Bell provided the design and technical development was led by Claire Furlong in collaboration with Professor Michael Templeton of Imperial College London, and was carried out at the Centre for Advanced Technology (CAT) in Wales. By the end of the project, the team had built a usable prototype at CAT, determined key operating parameters and shown that there was consumer interest.

In parallel with the LSHTM work and also with Bill and Melinda Gates Foundation funding, Biofilcom (under Kweko Annu) developed a vermifilter toilet which has been commercialised in Ghana and Bangladesh. Development of the GSAP (Ghana Sustainable Aid Project) Microflush vermifilter toilet was also funded by the Bill and Melinda Gates Foundation.

Oxfam subsequently funded the construction of field-based trials in Ethiopia (in 2013), Liberia (in 2013), while ACTED funded the development and construction of a communal (school) vermifilter toilet in Pakistan.

In continuation of the earlier Sanitation Ventures work, in 2013 Bear Valley Ventures was awarded a Development Innovation Ventures grant from USAID to support field testing in three countries and three different settings. This work was carried out in partnership with Oxfam (humanitarian relief camp, Myanmar), Water for People (peri-urban, Uganda) and PriMove (rural, India). After a year long trial the conclusion was that it worked well in all three settings: the results from India have been published.

After field testing Bear Valley Ventures and PriMove (under Ajeet Oak) continued to collaborate from 2014 onwards on developing and marketing the Tiger Toilet band vermifilter toilet to low income rural and peri-urban households. From 2015 to 2017 they worked with the Institute for Transformative Technologies (under Shashi Bulaswar) to rigorously test the product and explore paths to scale. In 2018 Bear Valley Ventures and PriMove set up TBF Environmental Solutions Pvt Ltd to commercialise the Tiger Toilet and related technologies.

Oxfam (under Andy Bastable) have collaborated closely with Dr Claire Furlong to further develop applications for emergency and humanitarian camps.

In 2020 the International Worm-based Sanitation Association was formed under the leadership of Prof. Michael Templeton of Imperial College London to share, develop and promote best practice in vermifiltration for sanitation.

== See also ==
- Composting toilet
- Reuse of human excreta
- Vermifilter
