= Return flow =

Water that escapes after irrigation

Return flow is surface water and groundwater that leaves the field following application of irrigation water. While irrigation return flows are point sources, in the United States they are expressly exempted from discharge permit requirements under the Clean Water Act.

Return flows generally return to the irrigation centre after a period of about three to four weeks; due to this, the farmers usually need to pour bleach into the water to kill off any organisms that have entered the stream. If this is not taken care of, diseases such as typhoid fever or cholera could enter the irrigation and pose a risk of epidemic disease to surrounding towns and cities.

The return flows in irrigation is nearly 50% of the water supplied in silty clay soil type in tropical countries. The salinity of the return flow water increases with the decrease in percentage of return flow quantity. The rest of the water supplied to irrigation evaporates into atmosphere due to evapotranspiration.

When ground water is extracted for irrigation and other uses, most of the return flows seep back into the ground instead of joining the nearby surface stream. When ground water is used in excess of recharge from rainfall or precipitation, the quality of groundwater deteriorates over a period of time and becomes unfit for irrigation use.
