= Blackwater (waste) =

Wastewater from toilets

Blackwater is wastewater containing human waste (feces and urine). As such, it contains large amounts of pathogens that may spread by the fecal–oral route. Blackwater is distinguished from greywater (which comes from sinks, baths, washing machines, and other household appliances apart from toilets). Greywater results from washing food, clothing, dishes, as well as from showering or bathing.

Blackwater and greywater are kept separate in "ecological buildings", such as autonomous buildings. Recreational vehicles often have separate holding tanks for greywater from showers and sinks, and blackwater from the toilet.

== Terminology ==
Blackwater is a term dating to at least the 1970s. In Hong Kong regional usage, an alternative term for it is "soil water".

== Treatment processes ==
Blackwater contains pathogens that must decompose before they can be released safely into the environment. It is difficult to process blackwater if it contains a large quantity of excess water, or if it must be processed quickly, because of the high concentrations of organic material.

== Treatment near aquifer ==
Safeguarding groundwater quality is imperative when treating blackwater in proximity to an aquifer. An aquifer refers to a subsurface stratum composed of permeable rock, soil, or sediment that retains and facilitates the movement of water. Inadequate management of the treated water from blackwater treatment procedures can introduce contaminants into the aquifer, posing a significant risk.

When evaluating the safety of treating blackwater in close proximity to an aquifer, various considerations come into play:

1. Hydrogeology assessment: It is essential to comprehend the geological and hydrogeological features of the region. The permeability of the soil or rock layer between the treatment site and the aquifer plays a significant role in determining the potential for contaminants to reach the groundwater.
2. Effectiveness of treatment: The efficiency of the blackwater treatment system is of utmost importance. The treated water must adhere to stringent quality standards to ensure thorough removal of contaminants before any discharge or potential infiltration.
3. Creation of buffer zones: Implementing buffer zones between the treatment facility and the aquifer is crucial for minimizing contamination risks. These zones act as natural barriers, allowing for additional treatment and reduction of potential contaminants.
4. Adherence to regulations: Strict compliance with environmental regulations is a fundamental requirement. Authorities often establish guidelines and standards to safeguard groundwater quality, and adherence to these regulations is vital for the safety of water treatment practices.
5. Monitoring and maintenance: Regular monitoring of both groundwater quality and the treatment system's performance is essential. A robust monitoring program facilitates early detection of issues, enabling prompt corrective action.
6. Risk assessment: A comprehensive risk assessment, including modeling potential pathways for contaminant transport, is necessary. This helps identify and mitigate potential risks to the aquifer.

Entities planning to treat blackwater near an aquifer should engage with relevant environmental authorities, secure necessary permits, and involve experts in hydrogeology and environmental engineering. Stringent precautions must be taken to prevent any adverse impacts on groundwater quality, ensuring the long-term sustainability and safety of water treatment practices in such areas. Consequently, the most prudent choice is to refrain from treating blackwater near an aquifer.

=== Composting ===
However, if blackwater does not contain excess water, or if it receives primary treatment to de-water, then it is easily processed through composting. The heat produced by naturally occurring thermophilic microorganisms will heat the compost to over 60 °C (140 °F), and destroy potential pathogens.

Blackwater generation can be avoided by making use of composting toilets and vermifilter toilets. In certain autonomous buildings, such as earthships, this is almost always present and allows the water requirements of the building (which, with earthships, are self-generated) to be heavily reduced. Besides saving water, composting toilets allow the user to reuse the nutrients found therein (e.g., for growing crops/trees).

== See also ==
- Algae fuel
- Constructed wetland
- Container-based sanitation
- Ecological sanitation
- Night soil
