= Clivus Multrum =

Composting toilet brand

A Clivus Multrum composting toilet with separate, inclined compost compartment

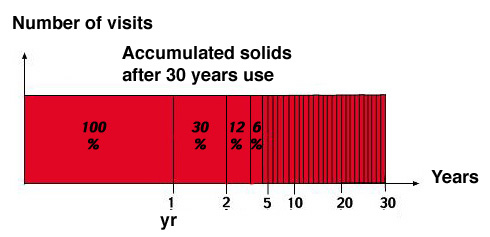
Accumulated solids after 30 years in a Clivus Multrum

A Clivus Multrum is a type of composting toilet and the name of the company that markets these toilets. "Clivus" is Latin for incline or slope; "multrum" is a Swedish composite word meaning "compost room", thus a "Clivus Multrum" is an inclined compost room.

The first prototype was built in 1939 in Tyresö, Sweden, by art teacher Rikard Lindström, who owned a property on the Baltic Sea in Stockholm, Sweden. Lindström built a single-chamber concrete tank, with sloped bottom and chimney, for disposal of kitchen and toilet waste. It functioned for several decades and was eventually patented in 1962. In 1964, the first commercial model was constructed out of fiberglass.

In the 1970s, Abby Rockefeller, in the United States, read about the idea and wanted to buy a system, but was told they were not for sale due to lack of technical support. In 1973, Rockefeller founded Clivus Multrum, Inc. in Massachusetts under license from Lindström to market its composting toilet. The Clivus Multrum brand of composting toilets is marketed globally.

Clivus Multrum today has designed a number of different prototypes and sizes. The process is advertised as enclosed, long-term composting and is characterized as being odor-free, low maintenance, and able to yield a clean, pathogen-free fertilizer that can be used in agriculture.
