= Wastewater =

Water that has been used and contaminated

Wastewater is water generated after the use of drinking water, fresh water, raw water, or saline water in a variety of deliberate applications or processes. Another definition of wastewater is "Used water from any combination of domestic, industrial, commercial or agricultural activities, surface runoff / storm water, and any sewer infiltration or sewer inflow". In everyday usage, wastewater is commonly a synonym for sewage (also called domestic wastewater or municipal wastewater), which is wastewater that is produced by a community of people.

== Types ==
Wastewater is a generic term that may refer to water containing contaminants originating from various settings. Major categories include:

- Domestic wastewater, which encompasses sewage produced by communities and is commonly subdivided into greywater and blackwater.
- Industrial wastewater: waterborne waste generated from a variety of industrial processes, such as manufacturing operations, mineral extraction, power generation, or water and wastewater treatment.
- Cooling water, is released with potential thermal pollution after use to condense steam or reduce machinery temperatures by conduction or evaporation.
- Leachate: precipitation containing pollutants dissolved while percolating through ores, raw materials, products, or solid waste.
- Return flow: the flow of water carrying suspended soil, pesticide residues, or dissolved minerals and nutrients from irrigated cropland.
- Surface runoff: the flow of water occurring on the ground surface when excess rainwater, stormwater, meltwater, or other sources, can no longer sufficiently rapidly infiltrate the soil.
- Urban runoff, including water used for outdoor cleaning activity and landscape irrigation in densely populated areas created by urbanization.
- Agricultural wastewater: animal husbandry wastewater generated from confined animal operations.

== Treatment ==
Wastewater treatment refers to processes used to remove contaminants from wastewater. The treated effluent is typically discharged to a receiving water body with the aim of limiting adverse environmental impacts. Sewage is usually treated at sewage treatment plants. Industrial wastewater may be treated at facilities designed for industrial processes or, in some cases, at municipal sewage treatment plants. When the latter occurs, industries generally perform on-site pretreatment before discharge to the municipal system. Other specialized treatment plants exist for agricultural wastewater and leachate.

Treatment processes commonly include phase separation, biological and chemical transformation steps, and polishing to improve effluent quality. Sludge is the principal by-product generated during treatment and is further processed at the same facility or at separate sludge treatment plants. Anaerobic treatment processes can additionally produce biogas.
