= Composting toilet =

Type of toilet that treats human excreta by a biological process called composting

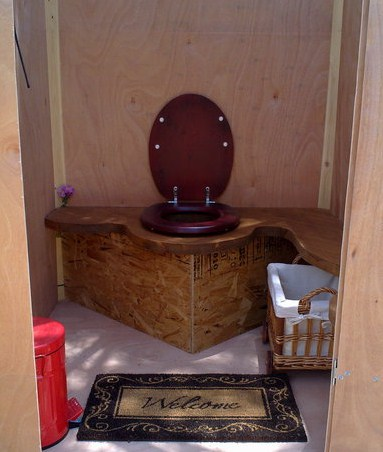
- Composting toilet at Activism Festival 2010 in the mountains outside Jerusalem
- Position in sanitation chain: User interface, collection/treatment (on-site)
- Application level: Household, neighborhood
- Management level: Household, public, shared (most common is household level)
- Inputs: Feces, urine, organics, dry cleansing materials
- Outputs: Compost, effluent
- Types: Slow composting (or moldering) toilets, active composters (self-contained), vermifilter toilets
- Environmental concerns: None

A composting toilet is a type of dry toilet that treats human waste by a biological process called composting. This process leads to the decomposition of organic matter and turns human waste into compost-like material. Composting is carried out by microorganisms (mainly bacteria and fungi) under controlled aerobic conditions. Most composting toilets use no water for flushing and are therefore called "dry toilets".

In many composting toilet designs, a carbon additive such as sawdust, coconut coir, or peat moss is added after each use. This practice creates air pockets in the human waste to promote aerobic decomposition. This also improves the carbon-to-nitrogen ratio and reduces potential odor. Most composting toilet systems rely on mesophilic composting. Longer retention time in the composting chamber also facilitates pathogen die-off. The end product can also be moved to a secondary system – usually another composting step – to allow more time for mesophilic composting to further reduce pathogens.

Composting toilets, together with the secondary composting step, produce a humus-like end product that can be used to enrich soil if local regulations allow this. Some composting toilets have urine diversion systems in the toilet bowl to collect the urine separately and control excess moisture. A vermifilter toilet is a composting toilet with flushing water where earthworms are used to promote decomposition to compost.

Composting toilets do not require a connection to septic tanks or sewer systems unlike flush toilets. Common applications include national parks, remote holiday cottages, ecotourism resorts, off-grid homes and rural areas in developing countries.

== Terminology ==
Schematic of the composting chamber which is located below the toilet seat

The term "composting toilet" is used quite loosely, and its meaning varies by country. For example, in Germany and Scandinavian countries, composting always refers to a predominantly aerobic process. This aerobic composting may take place with an increase in temperature due to microbial action, or without a temperature increase in the case of slow composting or cold composting. If earthworms are used (vermicomposting) then there is also no increase in temperature.

Composting toilets differ from pit latrines and arborloos, which use less controlled decomposition and may not protect groundwater from nutrient or pathogen contamination or provide optimal nutrient recycling. They also differ from urine-diverting dry toilets (UDDTs) where pathogen reduction is achieved through dehydration (also known by the more precise term "desiccation") and where the feces collection vault is kept as dry as possible. Composting toilets aim to have a certain degree of moisture in the composting chamber.

Composting toilets can be used to implement an ecological sanitation approach for resource recovery, and some people call their composting toilet designs "ecosan toilets" for that reason. However, this is not recommended as the two terms (i.e. composting and ecosan) are not identical.

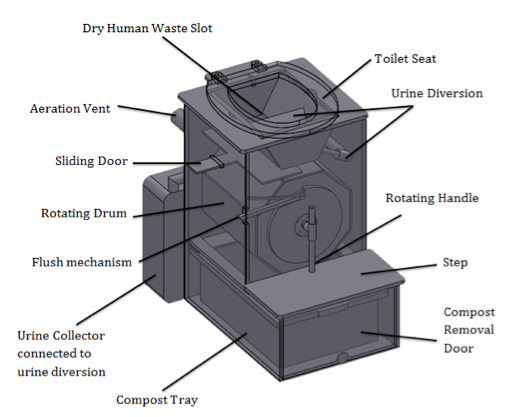
Schematic of a composting toilet with urine diversion

Composting toilets have also been called "sawdust toilets", which can be appropriate if the amount of aerobic composting taking place in the toilet's container is very limited. The "Clivus multrum" is a type of composting toilet which has a large composting chamber below the toilet seat and also receives undigested organic material to increase the carbon to nitrogen ratio. Alternatives with smaller composting chambers are called "self-contained composting toilets" since the composting chamber is part of the toilet unit itself.

== Applications ==
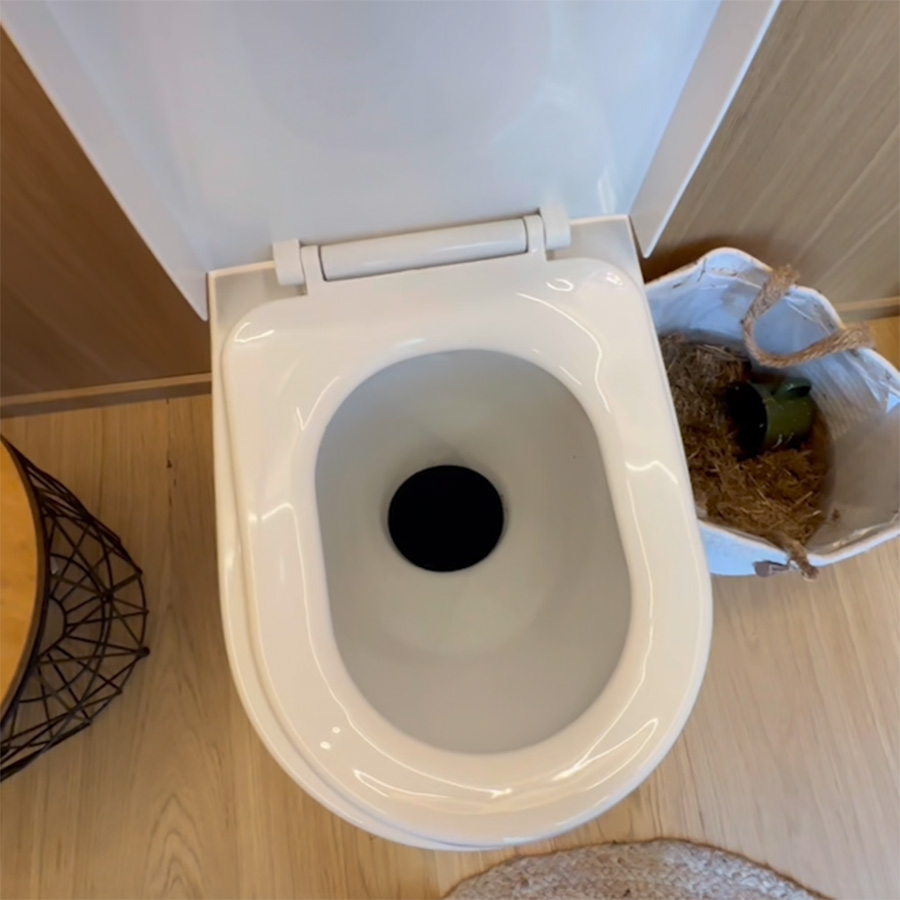
This is the pedestal for a split-system composting toilet where collection/treatment chambers are located below the bathroom floor.

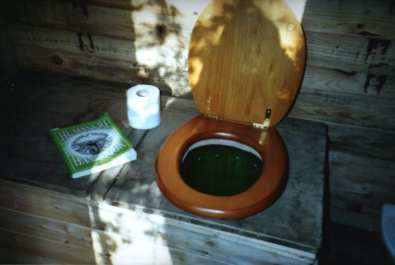
Inexpensive do-it-yourself compost toilet at Dial House, Essex, England, utilizing an old desk as the toilet unit.

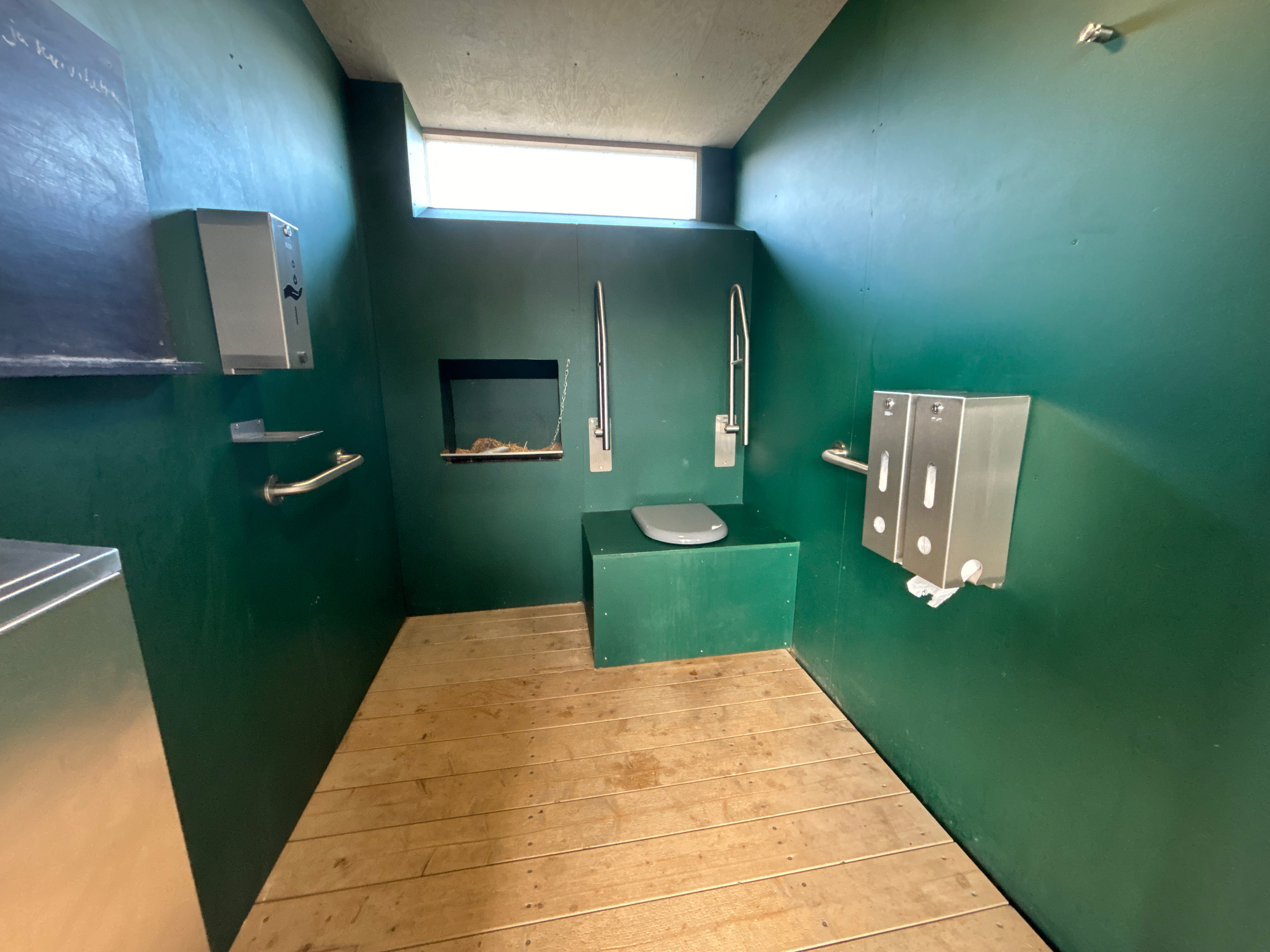
Public composting toilet at a park in Helsinki, Finland

Composting toilets can be suitable in areas such as a rural area or a park that lacks a suitable water supply, sewers and sewage treatment. They can also help increase the resilience of existing sanitation systems in the face of possible natural disasters such as climate change, earthquakes or tsunami. Composting toilets can reduce or perhaps eliminate the need for a septic tank system to reduce environmental footprint (particularly when used in conjunction with an on-site greywater treatment system).

These types of toilets can be used for resource recovery by reusing sanitized feces and urine as fertilizer and soil conditioner for ornamental or other gardening.

== Basics ==
=== Components and use ===
A composting toilet consists of two elements: a place to sit or squat and a collection/composting unit. The composting unit consists of four main parts:

- storage or composting chamber
- a ventilation unit to ensure that the degradation process in the toilet is predominantly aerobic and to vent odorous gases
- a leachate collection or urine diversion system to remove excess liquid
- an access door for extracting the compost

Many composting toilets collect urine in the same chamber as feces; thus they do not divert urine. Adding small amounts of water that is used for anal cleansing is no problem for the composting toilet to handle.

Some composting toilets divert urine (and water used for anal washing) to prevent the creation of anaerobic conditions that can result from over saturation of the compost, which leads to odors and vector problems. This usually requires all users to use the toilet in a seated position. Offering a waterless urinal in addition to the toilet can help keep excess amounts of urine out of the composting chamber. Alternatively, in rural areas, men and boys may be encouraged just to find a tree.

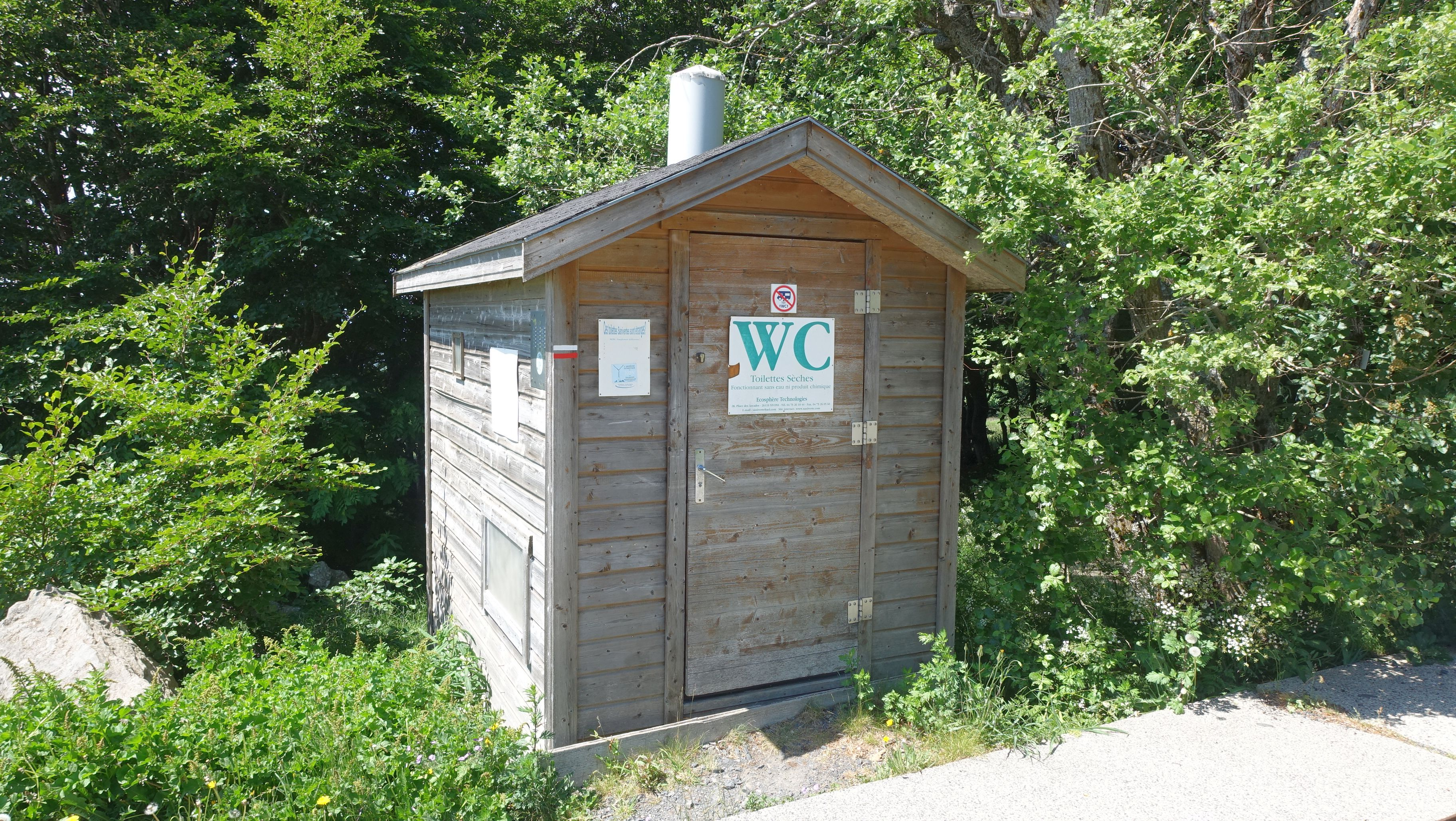
Public composting toilet in France (Mont Gerbier de Jonc)

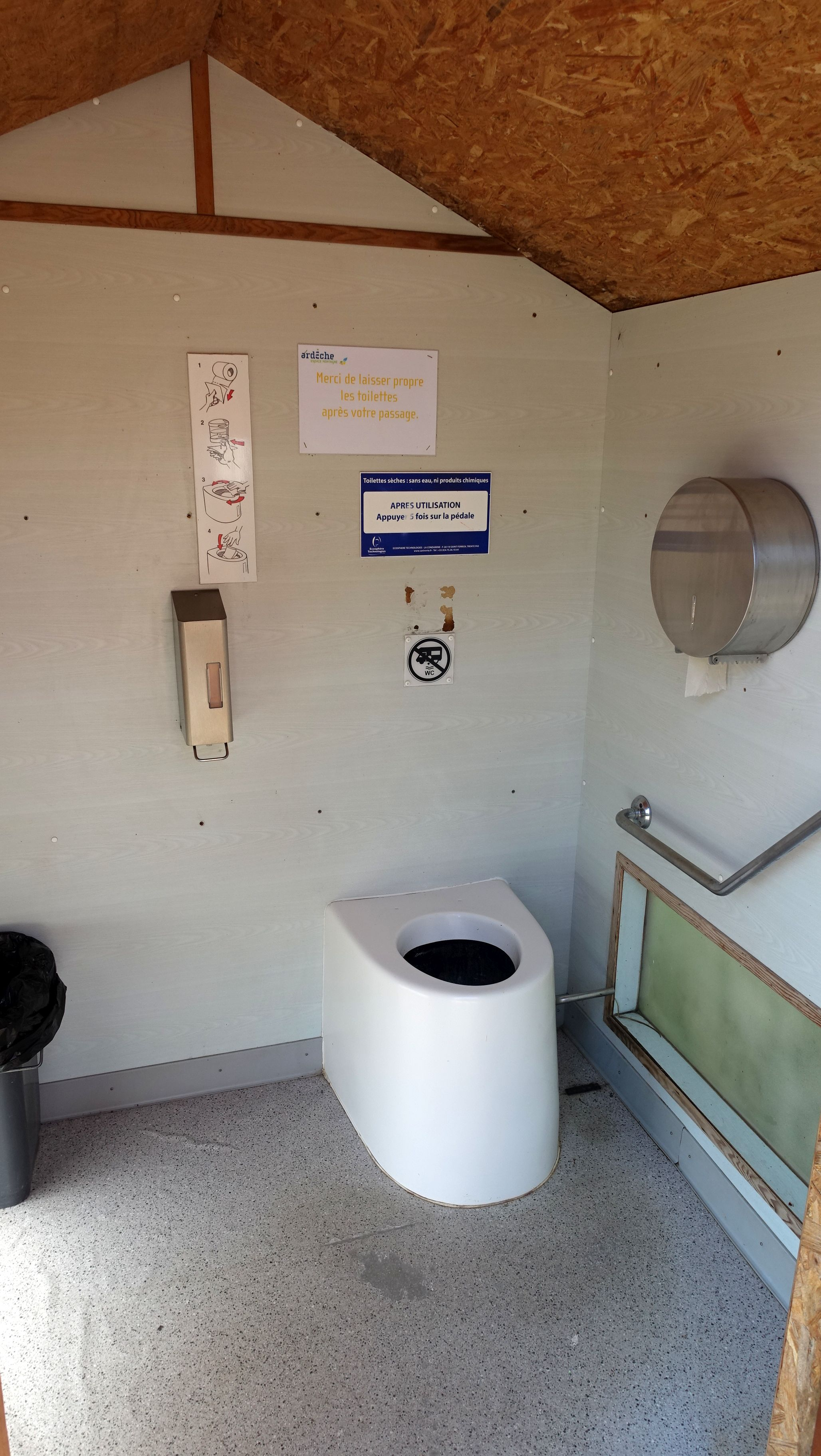
View inside public composting toilet in France

=== Construction ===
The composting chamber can be constructed above or below ground level. It can be inside a structure or include a separate superstructure.

A drainage system removes leachate. Otherwise, excess moisture can cause anaerobic conditions and impede decomposition. Urine diversion can improve compost quality, since urine contains large amounts of ammonia that inhibits microbiological activity.

Composting toilets greatly reduce human waste volumes through psychrophilic, thermophilic or mesophilic composting. Keeping the composting chamber insulated and warm protects the composting process from slowing due to low temperatures.

=== Odorous gases ===
The following gases may be emitted during the composting process that takes place in composting toilets: hydrogen sulfide (H_{2}S), ammonia, nitrous oxide (N_{2}O) and volatile organic compounds (VOCs). These gases can potentially lead to complaints about odours. Some methane may also be present, but it is not odorous.

== Pathogen removal ==
Waste-derived compost recycles fecal nutrients, but it can carry and spread pathogens if the process of reuse of waste is not done properly. Pathogen destruction rates in composting toilets are usually low, particularly of helminth eggs (such as those from the genus Ascaris). This carries the risk of spreading disease if a proper system management is not in place. Compost from human waste processed under only mesophilic conditions or taken directly from the compost chamber is not safe for food production. High temperatures or long composting times are required to kill helminth eggs, the hardiest of all pathogens. Helminth infections are common in many developing countries.

In thermophilic composting bacteria that thrive at temperatures of 40–60 °C (104–140 °F) oxidize (break down) waste into its components, some of which are consumed in the process, reducing volume and eliminating potential pathogens. To destroy pathogens, thermophilic composting must heat the compost pile sufficiently, or enough time (1–2 years) must elapse since fresh material was added that biological activity has had the same pathogen removal effect.

One guideline claims that pathogen levels are reduced to a safe level by thermophilic composting at temperatures of 55 °C for at least two weeks or at 60 °C for one week. An alternative guideline claims that complete pathogen destruction may be achieved already if the entire compost heap reaches a temperature of 62 °C (144 °F) for one hour, 50 °C (122 °F) for one day, 46 °C (115 °F) for one week or 43 °C (109 °F) for one month, although others regard this as overly optimistic.

== Design considerations ==
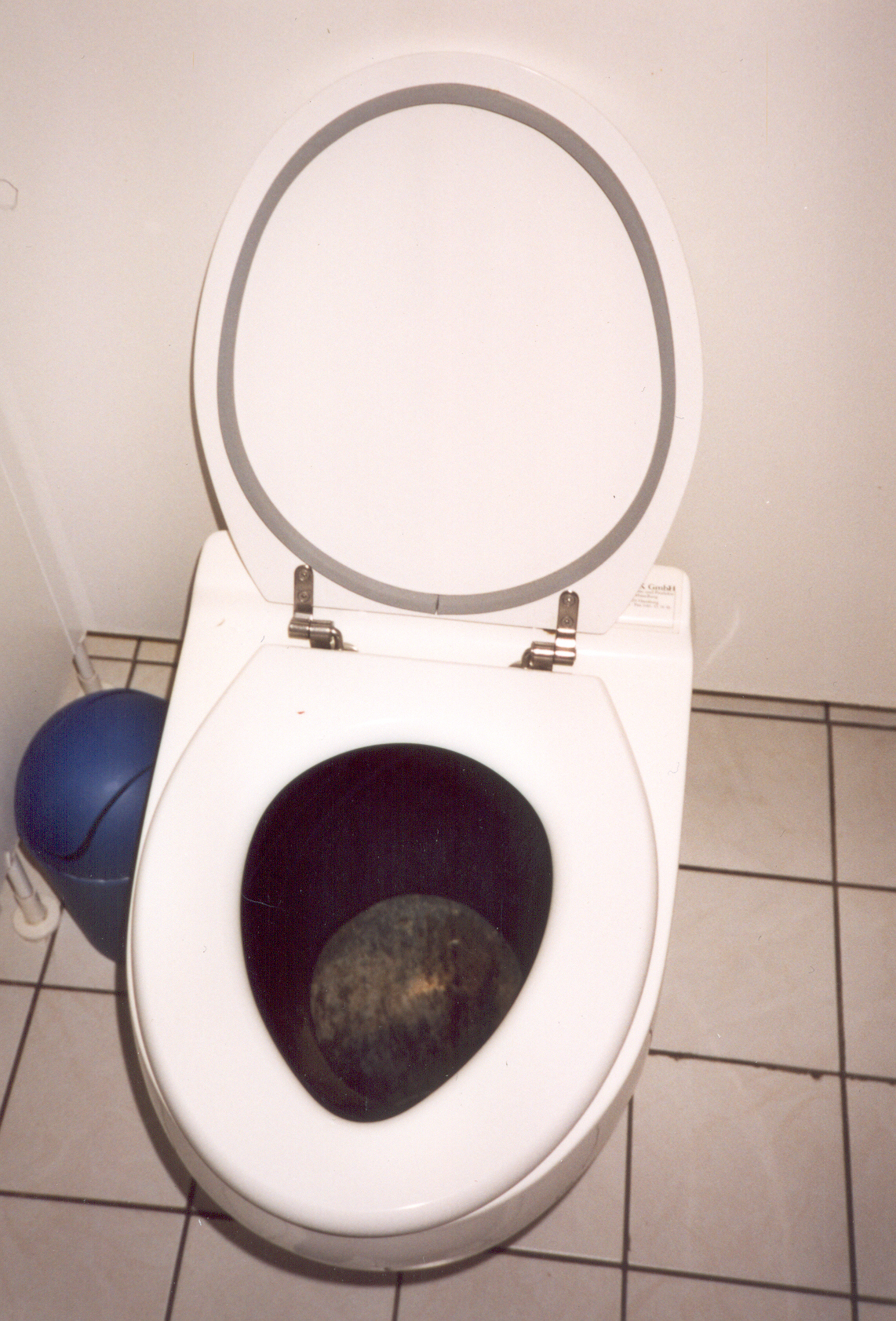
Composting toilet with a seal in the lid in Germany

=== Environmental factors ===
Four main factors affect the decomposition process:

- Sufficient oxygen is necessary for aerobic composting
- Moisture content from 45 to 70 percent (heuristically, "the compost should feel damp to the touch, with only a drop or two of water expelled when tightly squeezed in the hand".)
- Temperature between 40 °C (104 °F) and 50 °C (122 °F), which is achieved through proper chamber dimensioning and possibly active mixing
- Carbon-to-nitrogen ratio (C:N) of 25:1

=== Additives and bulking material ===
Human waste and food waste do not provide optimum conditions for composting. Usually the water and nitrogen content is too high, particularly when urine is mixed with feces. Additives or "bulking material", such as wood chips, bark chips, sawdust, shredded dry leaves, ash and pieces of paper can absorb moisture. The additives improve pile aeration and increase the carbon to nitrogen ratio. Bulking material also covers feces and reduces insect access. Absent sufficient bulking material, the material may become too compact and form impermeable layers, which leads to anaerobic conditions and odour.

=== Leachate management ===
Leachate removal controls moisture levels, which is necessary to ensure rapid, aerobic composting. Some commercial units include a urine-separator or urine-diverting system and/or a drain at the bottom of the composter for this purpose.

=== Aeration and mixing ===
Microbial action also requires oxygen, typically from the air. Commercial systems provide ventilation that moves air from the bathroom, through the waste container, and out a vertical pipe, venting above the roof. This air movement (via convection or fan forced) passes carbon dioxide and odors.

Some units require manual methods for periodic aeration of the solid mass such as rotating the composting chamber or pulling an "aerator rake" through the mass.

=== Comparisons with other types of toilets ===
==== Pit latrines ====
Composting toilets convert feces into a dry, odorless material which is very different to the wet fecal sludge produced in pit latrines which has to be taken care of through a fecal sludge management system. Composting toilets do not cause groundwater pollution due to their safe containment of feces in above-ground vaults compared to pit latrines, allowing composting toilets to be sited in locations where pit-based systems are not appropriate.

Composting toilets may have higher capital costs than pit latrines, but lower lifecycle costs. They require more involvement by the user than the "drop and forget" approach of pit latrines.

==== Flush toilets ====
Unlike flush toilets, composting toilets do not require a sewerage system and do not mix flushing water with urine and feces. They require more involvement by the user than the "flush and forget" approach of flush toilets connected to sewage treatment plants.

==== Urine-diverting dry toilets ====
Composting toilets, although similar to and sharing many advantages and disadvantages with urine-diverting dry toilets (UDDT), are more complex and require more maintenance to keep a consistent and relatively high moisture content. Some composting toilets are designed with urine diversion.

== Types ==
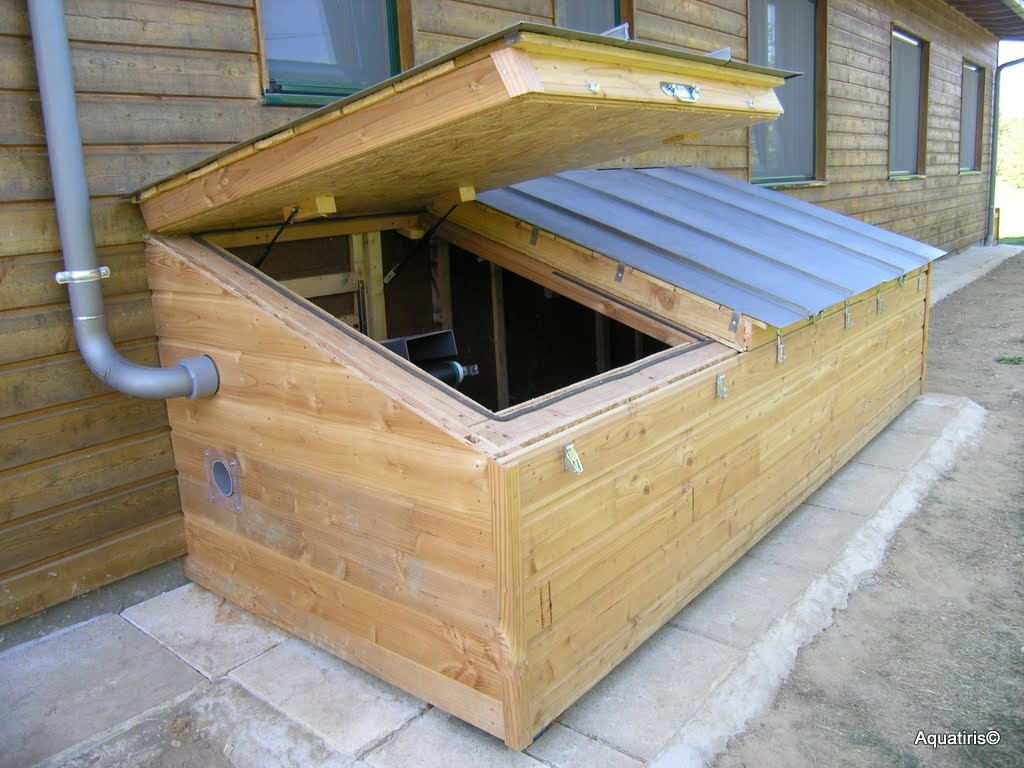
External composting chamber of a composting toilet at a house in France

Commercial units and construct-it-yourself systems are available. Variations include number of composting vaults, removable vault, urine diversion and active mixing/aeration.

=== Slow composting (or moldering) toilets ===
Most composting toilets use slow composting which is also called "cold composting". The compost heap is built up step by step over time.

The finished end product from "slow" composting toilets ("moldering toilets" or "moldering privies" in the US), is generally not free of pathogens. World Health Organization Guidelines from 2006 offer a framework for safe reuse of waste, using a multiple barrier approach.

Slow composting toilets employ a passive approach. Common applications involve modest and often seasonal use, such as remote trail networks. They are typically designed such that the materials deposited can be isolated from the operational part. The toilet can also be closed to allow further mesophilic composting. Slow composting toilets rely on long retention times for pathogen reduction and for decomposition of waste or on the combination of time and/or the addition of red wiggler worms for vermi-composting. Worms can be introduced to accelerate composting. Some jurisdictions of the US consider these worms as invasive species.

=== Active composters (self-contained) ===
"Self-contained" composting toilets compost in a container within the toilet unit. They are slightly larger than a flush toilet, but use roughly the same floor space. Some units use fans for aeration, and optionally, heating elements to maintain optimum temperatures to hasten the composting process and to evaporate urine and other moisture. Operators of composting toilets commonly add a small amount of absorbent carbon material (such as untreated sawdust, coconut coir, or peat moss) after each use to create air pockets to encourage aerobic processing, to absorb liquid and to create an odor barrier. This additive is sometimes referred to as "bulking agent". Some owner-operators use microbial "starter" cultures to ensure composting bacteria are in the process, although this is not critical.

=== Vermifilter toilet ===
A vermifilter toilet is a composting toilet with flushing water where earthworms are used to promote decomposition to compost. It can be connected to a low-flush or a micro-flush toilet which uses about 500 millilitres (17 US fl oz) per use. Solids accumulate on the surface of the filter bed while liquid drains through the filter medium and is discharged from the reactor. The solids (feces and toilet paper) are aerobically digested by aerobic bacteria and composting earthworms into castings (humus), thereby significantly reducing the volume of organic material.

=== Other ===
Some units employ roll-away containers fitted with aerators, while others use sloped-bottom tanks.

== Maintenance ==
Maintenance is critical to ensure proper operation, including odor prevention. Maintenance tasks include: cleaning, servicing technical components such as fans and removal of compost, leachate and urine. Urine removal is only required for those types of composting toilets using urine diversion.

Once composting is complete (or earlier), the compost must be removed from the unit. How often this occurs is a function of container size, usage and composting conditions, such as temperature. Active, hot composting may require months, while passive, cold composting may require years. Properly managed units yield output volumes of about 10% of inputs.

== Uses of compost ==
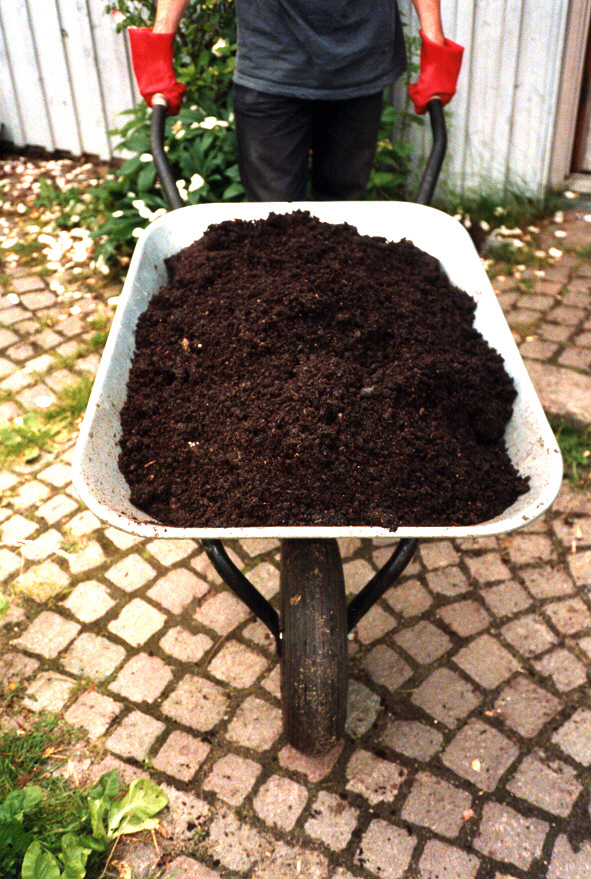
Finished compost from a composting toilet ready for application as soil improvement in Kiel-Hassee, Germany

The material from composting toilets is a humus-like material, which can be suitable as a soil amendment for agriculture. Compost from residential composting toilets can be used in domestic gardens, and this is the main such use.

Enriching soil with compost adds substantial nitrogen, phosphorus, potassium, carbon and calcium. In this regard compost is equivalent to many fertilizers and manures purchased in garden stores. Compost from composting toilets has a higher nutrient availability than the dried feces that result from a urine-diverting dry toilet.

Urine is typically present, although some is lost via leaching and evaporation. Urine can contain up to 90 percent of the residual nitrogen, up to 50 percent of the phosphorus, and up to 70 percent of the potassium.

Compost derived from these toilets has in principle the same uses as compost derived from other organic waste products, such as sewage sludge or municipal organic waste. However, users of waste-derived compost must consider the risk of pathogens.

=== Pharmaceutical residues ===
Waste-derived compost may contain prescription pharmaceuticals. Such residues are also present in conventional sewage treatment effluent. This could contaminate groundwater. Among the medications that have been found in groundwater in recent years are antibiotics, antidepressants, blood thinners, ACE inhibitors, calcium-channel blockers, digoxin, estrogen, progesterone, testosterone, Ibuprofen, caffeine, carbamazepine, fibrates and cholesterol-reducing medications. Between 30% and 95% of pharmaceuticals medications are excreted by the human body. Medications that are lipophilic (dissolved in fats) are more likely to reach groundwater by leaching from fecal wastes. Sewage treatment plants remove an average of 60% of these medications. The percentage of medications degraded during composting of waste has not yet been reported.

== History ==
In the late 19th century in developed countries, some inventors, scientists and public health officials supported the use of "dry earth closets", a type of dry toilet with similarities to composting toilets, although the collection vessel for the human waste was not designed to compost.

== Regulations ==
=== International Organization for Standardization (ISO) ===
In 2016, the International Organization for Standardization (ISO) published the standard "Activities relating to drinking water and wastewater services — Guidelines for the management of basic on-site domestic wastewater services". The standard is meant to be used in conjunction with ISO 24511. It deals with toilets (including composting toilets) and toilet waste. The guidelines are applicable to basic wastewater systems and include the complete domestic wastewater cycle, such as planning, usability, operation and maintenance, disposal, reuse and health.

=== International Association of Plumbing and Mechanical Officials ===
The International Association of Plumbing and Mechanical Officials (IAPMO) is a plumbing and mechanical code structure adopted by many developed countries. It recently proposed an addition to its "Green Plumbing Mechanical Code Supplement" that, "...outlines performance criteria for site built composting toilets with and without urine diversion and manufactured composting toilets." If adopted, this composting and urine diversion toilet code (the first of its kind in the United States) will appear in the 2015 edition of the Green Supplement to the Uniform Plumbing Code.

=== United States ===
No performance standards for composting toilets are universally accepted in the US. Seven jurisdictions in North America use American National Standard/NSF International Standard ANSI/NSF 41-1998: Non-Liquid Saturated Treatment Systems. An updated version was published in 2011. Systems might also be listed with the Canadian Standards Association, cETL-US, and other standards programs.

Regarding byproduct regulation, several US states permit disposal of solids from composting toilets (usually a distinction between different types of dry toilets is not made) by burial, with varying or no minimum depth mandates (as little as 6 inches). For instance:

- Massachusetts: "Residuals from the composting toilet system must be buried on-site and covered with a minimum of six inches of clean compacted soil. Massachusetts requires that any liquids produced but, "not recycled through the toilet [itself, be] either discharged through a greywater system on the property that includes a septic tank and soil absorption system, or removed by a licensed septage hauler."
- Oregon: "Humus from composting toilets may be used around ornamental shrubs, flowers, trees, or fruit trees and shall be buried under at least twelve inches of soil cover."
- Rhode Island: "Solids produced by alternative toilets may be buried on site" while "residuals shall not be applied to food crops."
- Virginia: "All materials removed from a composting privy shall be buried," and "compost material shall not be placed in vegetable gardens or on the ground surface."
- Vermont: "Byproducts may be disposed via "...shallow burial in a location approved by the Agency that meets the minimum site conditions [required for an onsite septic tank-based sanitation system]."
- Washington: models its extensive regulations for what it refers to as "waterless toilets" on the federal regulations that govern sewage sludge.

The Environmental Protection Agency has no jurisdiction over the byproducts of a dry toilet as long as waste are not referred to as "fertilizer" (but instead simply a material that is being disposed of). Federal rule 503, known colloquially as the "EPA Biosolids rule" or the "EPA sludge rule" applies only to fertilizer. Thus, individual states regulate composting toilets.

=== Germany ===
The regulations for composting toilets and other forms of dry toilets in Germany vary from state to state and from one application to another (e.g. use in allotment gardens or use in family homes and settlements). In the different states of Germany, it is the "Landesbauordnung" (translates to "state civil engineering regulations") of the respective state that regulates the use of such alternative toilets. Most of them stipulate the use of flush toilets, however there are many exceptions, for example in the states of Hamburg, Lower Saxony, Bavaria, Mecklenburg-Western Pomerania, Rhineland-Palatinate, Saxony-Anhalt and Thuringia. These generally make exceptions for the use of composting toilets in homes provided that there are no concerns for public health.

Regulations governing the use of compost and urine from composting toilets is less clear in Germany but it seems generally allowed provided it is used on one's own property and not sold to third parties.

=== Australia ===
In Australia, regulations for composting toilets and other "waterless toilets" vary according to state and local government standards, with most regulation occurring at the local government (council) level. The Department of Climate Change, Energy, the Environment, and Water supports the use of composting toilets in suitable situations as part of their "YourHome" initiative to make Australian housing more sustainable.

In New South Wales, approval for the construction and installation of a composting toilet on a site can be sought from the local council, which will approve systems that meet local government regulations and have been accredited by NSW Health. NSW Health supplies a list of accredited products and designs on their website. Shoalhaven City Council has produced an information brochure about composting toilets.

Specific rules for the use of portable composting toilets apply to some ecologically-sensitive areas in NSW, WA and QLD. However, permanent structures are widely used in national parks, including in Australian Alps National Parks.

In Western Australia, property owners can install their own composting toilet, though state regulations may apply.

== Examples ==
=== Finland ===
Numerous sparsely settled villages in rural areas in Finland are not connected to municipal water supply or sewer networks, requiring homeowners to operate their own systems. Individual private wells, i.e. shallow dug wells or boreholes in the bedrock, are often used for water supply, and many homeowners have opted for composting toilets. In addition, these toilets are common at holiday homes, often located near sensitive water bodies. For these reasons, many manufacturers of composting toilets are based in Finland, including Biolan, Ekolet, Kekkilä, Pikkuvihreä and Raita Environment.

Estimates made by leading Finnish composting toilet manufacturers and the Global Dry Toilet Association of Finland provided the following 2014 figures for composting toilet use in Finland:

- About 4% of single-family homes not connected to a public sewer network are equipped with a composting toilet.
- Some 200,000 manufactured composting toilets are thought to serve holiday homes, matched by the number of other dry toilets. The simplest ones are sited in an outhouse.

=== Germany ===
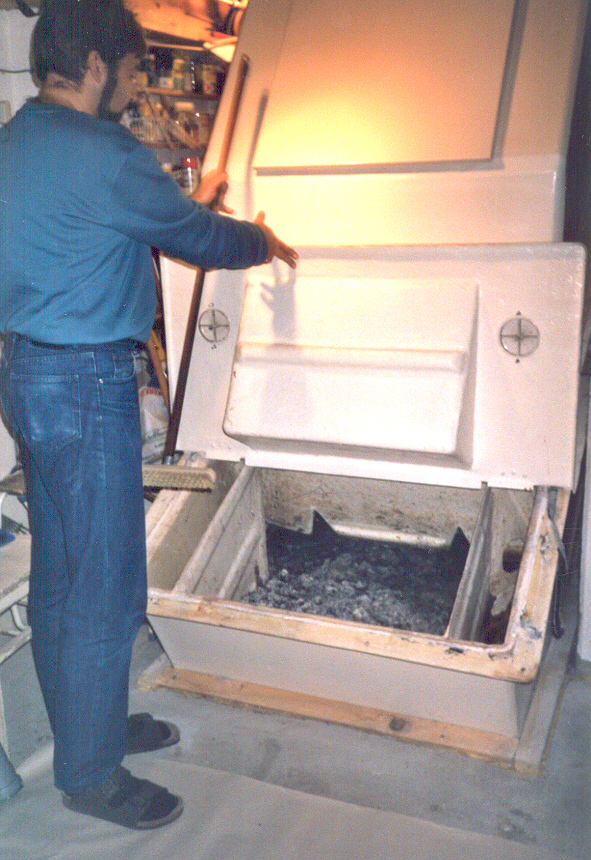
Composting container of "TerraNova" composting toilet, showing open removal chamber (town house at the ecological settlement Hamburg-Allermöhe, Germany)

Composting toilets have been successfully installed in houses with up to four floors. An estimate from 2008 put the number of composting toilets in households in Germany at 500. Most of these residences are also connected to a sewer system; the composting toilet was not installed due to a lack of sewer system but for other reasons, mainly because of an "ecological mindset" of the owners.

In Germany and Austria, composting toilets and other types of dry toilets have been installed in single and multi-family houses (e.g. Hamburg, Freiburg, Berlin), ecological settlements (e.g. Hamburg-Allermöhe, Hamburg-Braamwisch, Kiel-Hassee, Bielefeld-Waldquelle, Wien-Gänserndorf) and in public buildings (e.g. Ökohaus Rostock, VHS-Ökostation Stuttgart-Wartberg, public toilets in recreational areas, restaurants and huts in the Alps, house boats and forest Kindergartens).

The ecological settlement in Hamburg-Allermöhe has had composting toilets since 1982. The settlement of 36 single-family houses with approximately 140 inhabitants uses composting toilets, rainwater harvesting and constructed wetlands. Composting toilets save about 40 litres of water per capita per day compared to a conventional flush toilet (10 liter per flush), which adds up to 2,044 m^{3} water savings per year for the whole settlement.

=== United States ===
Slow composting toilets have been installed by the Green Mountain Club in Vermont's woodlands. They employ multiple vaults (called cribs) and a movable building. When one of the vaults fills, the building is moved over an empty vault. The full vault is left untouched for as long as possible (up to three years) before it is emptied. The large surface area and exposure to air currents can cause the pile to dry out. To counteract this, signs instruct users to urinate in the toilet. The club also uses pit latrines and simple bucket toilets with woodchips and external composting and directs users to urinate in the forest to prevent odiferous anaerobic conditions.

=== Worldwide ===
Composting toilets with a large composting container (of the type Clivus Multrum and derivations of it) are popular in US, Canada, Australia, New Zealand, Sweden and Finland. They can be bought and installed as commercial products, as designs for self builders or as "design derivatives" which are marketed under various names. It has been estimated that approximately 10,000 such toilets might be in use worldwide.

== Use in remote areas ==
Composting toilets are widely used in remote locations such as national parks, off-grid cabins, and boats where traditional sewage systems are impractical. They offer an environmentally friendly alternative by minimizing water usage and managing waste on-site.

== See also ==
- Reuse of human excreta
- Sanitation
- Sustainable sanitation
