= Aerobic digestion =

Aerobic digestion is a process in sewage treatment designed to reduce the volume of sewage sludge and make it suitable for subsequent use. More recently, technology has been developed that allows the treatment and reduction of other organic waste, such as food, cardboard and horticultural waste. It is a bacterial process occurring in the presence of oxygen. Bacteria rapidly consume organic matter and convert it into carbon dioxide, water and a range of lower molecular weight organic compounds. As there is no new supply of organic material from sewage, the activated sludge biota begin to die and are used as food by saprotrophic bacteria. This stage of the process is known as endogenous respiration and it is process that reduces the solid concentration in the sludge.

== Process ==
Aerobic digestion is typically used in an activated sludge treatment plant. Waste activated sludge and primary sludge are combined, where appropriate, and passed to a thickener where the solids content is increased. This substantially reduces the volume that is required to be treated in the digester. The process is usually run as a batch process with more than one digester tank in operation at any one time. Air is pumped through the tank and the contents are stirred to keep the contents fully mixed. Carbon dioxide, waste air and small quantities of other gases including hydrogen sulfide are given off. These waste gases require treatment to reduce odours in works close to housing or capable of generating public nuisance. The digestion is continued until the percentage of degradable solids is reduced to between 20% and 10% depending on local conditions. Where non-sewage waste is being processed, organic waste such as food, cardboard and horticultural waste can be significantly reduced in volume leaving an output that can be used as soil improver or biomass fuel.

== Advantages ==
Aerobic digestion occurs much faster than anaerobic digestion. The process is usually run at ambient temperature and the process is much less complex and easier to manage than anaerobic digestion.

== Disadvantages ==
The operating costs are typically much greater for aerobic digestion than for anaerobic digestion because of energy used by the blowers, pumps and motors needed to add oxygen to the process. However, recent technological advances include non-electrically aerated filter systems that use natural air currents for the aeration instead of electrically operated machinery.

The digested sludge is relatively low in residual energy and although it can be dried and incinerated to produce heat, the energy yield is very much lower than that produced by anaerobic digestion.

== Autothermal thermophilic aerobic digestion ==
Autothermal thermophilic aerobic digestion is a faecal sludge treatment design concept that uses the nutrients in the sludge and the metabolic heat of the bacteria to create high temperatures in the aerobic digester. This gradually shifts the microbial community towards thermophilic at temperatures typically at 55-degree Celsius or above. While the higher aeration requirements of autothermal thermophilic aerobic digestion further increases energy use and potential smell nuisance, the increased temperature makes the resulting biosolids much safer for re-use.
