= SVI =

SVI may refer to:

- Settleability Volume Index or sludge volume index (SVI): the volume in millimeters occupied by 1 g of activated sludge after aerated liquid has settled for 30 minutes
- Siddhartha Vanasthali Institute, a school in Nepal
- Southern Railway of Vancouver Island
- Spectravideo, computer and video-game manufacturer
- Strayer Voigt Inc, manufacturer of M1911-styled modular pistols
- Sviatoslav Mykhailiuk, Ukrainian basketball player nicknamed "Svi"
- Switch virtual interface, a logical layer-3 interface in a LAN environment
- System Volume Information (in Microsoft Windows file-systems)
- Sequential vapor infiltration, a synonym for sequential infiltration synthesis
