= Sludge bulking =

Sludge bulking is a microbial problem affecting solids separation in activated sludge wastewater treatment, which occurs when the sludge fails to separate out in the sedimentation tanks.

In treatment of sewage one process used is the activated sludge process in which air is passed through a mixture of sewage and old sludge to allow the micro-organisms to break down the organic components of the sewage. Sludge is continually drawn off as new sewage enters the tank and this sludge must then be settled so that the supernatant (the remaining liquid) can be separated to pass on to further stages of treatment.

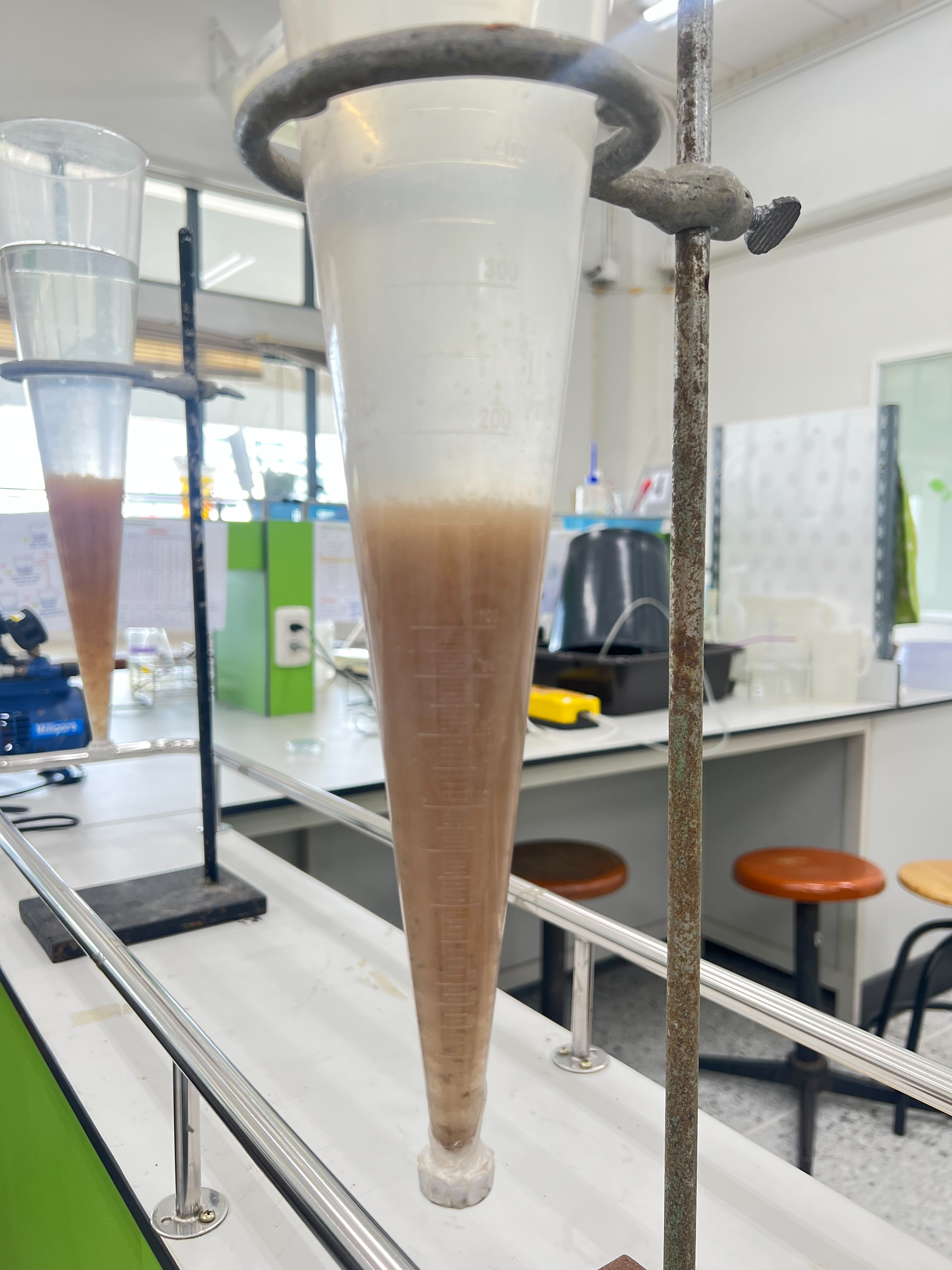
Sludge Volume Index measurement using Imhoff cone to identify if bulking occurs

The occurrence of sludge bulking prevents the solids from settling and compacting, which reduces the Return of Activated Sludge (RAS) solids concentrations, and can lead to overflow of the sludge blanket in the secondary clarifier of the wastewater treatment. Sludge bulking can be indicated using sludge settleability indicators. Activated sludge is considered as bulking if the Sludge volume index (SVI) value is above 150 mL/g. Sludge bulking can be categorized into two types: filamentous and nonfilamentous bulking. Filamentous bulking prevents activated sludge from compacting, while viscous bulking causes poor compaction and settling and may also cause foaming on the surface.

The rapid growth of microorganisms causing sludge bulking can be caused by several environmental conditions, such as low DO (Dissolved Oxygen) concentration, low F/M (Food-to-Microorganism) ratio, high concentration of low molecular weight organic acid concentration, septic wastewater or presence of hydrogen sulfide, nutrient deficiency, presence of Fats, Oils, and Grease (FOG), high sludge age or high MCRT (Mean Cell Residence Time), and low pH in the wastewater.

== Filamentous Bulking ==
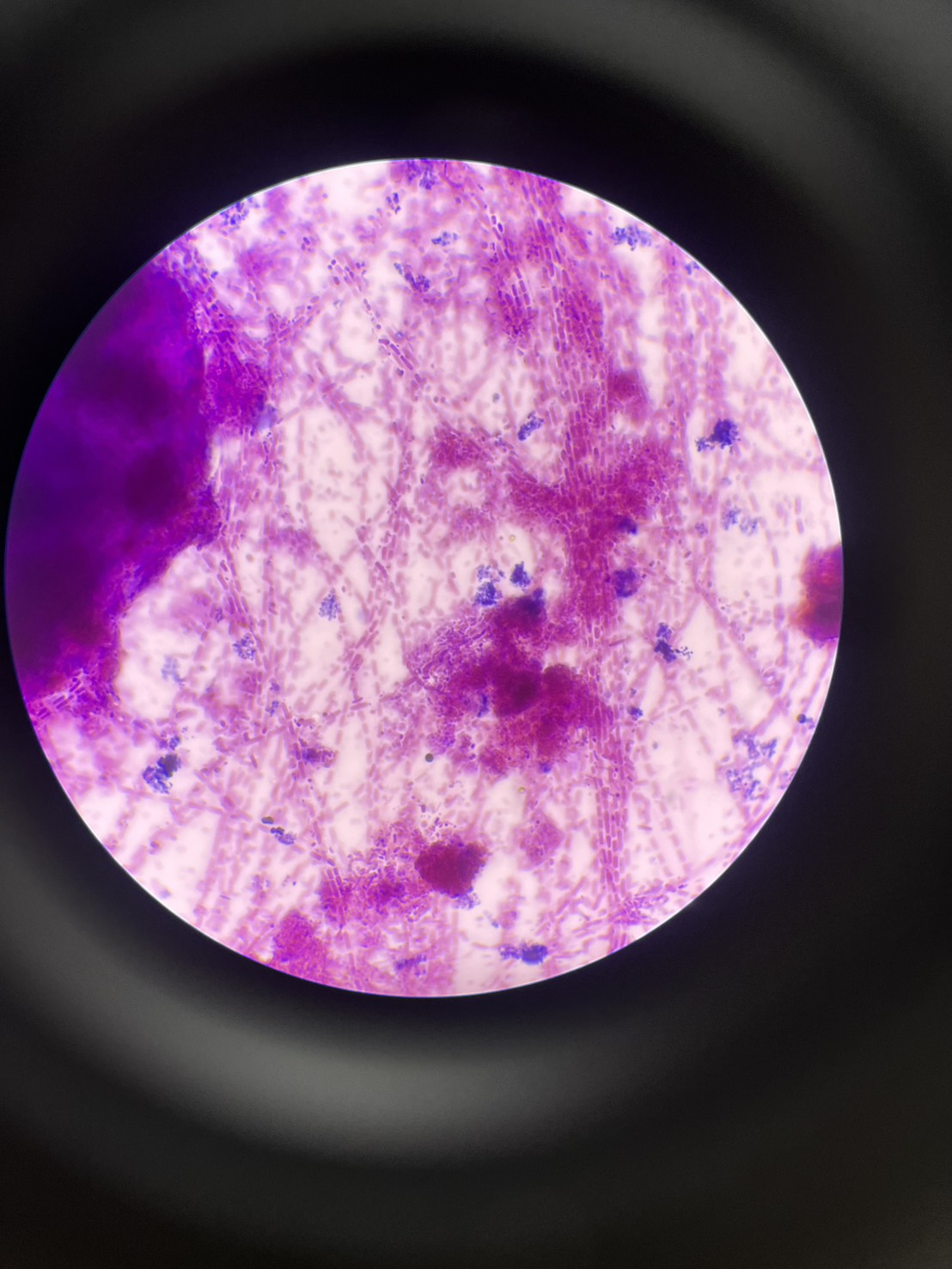
Gram positive filamentous and floc-forming bacteria under microscope using Gram staining method

Filamentous bulking is the main cause of sludge bulking, which caused by the overabundant growth of filamentous microorganisms including algae, bacteria and fungi. Filamentous microorganisms grow in long strands that have much greater volume and surface area than conventional floc and are very slow to settle. Under certain growing conditions, filamentous organisms predominate.

At normal levels, filamentous microorganisms work as the backbone that holds the floc bacteria together by trapping them in the filamentous network, which is important for activated sludge treatment. Hence, engineering control is needed to ensure the normal level of filamentous bacteria growth in the treatment system.

=== Monitoring ===
Microscopic analysis can be used to identify the biological causes of bulking and improve the condition of the wastewater treatment system. The microscopic observations focus on counting the amount of filament presence, such as using the Total Extended Filament Length method, and finding the characterizations of the floc and filamentous microorganisms using various gram staining methods.

Table of filamentous organisms with the specific conditions in Activated Sludge:
Cause	Filamentous Organisms
Low DO concentration	S. natans Type 1701 H. hydrossis
Low F/M	Type 0041 Type 0675 Type 1851 Type 0803
Elevated low molecular weight organic acid concentration	Type 021N Thiothrix I and II N. limicola I, II and III Type 0914 Type 0411 Type 0961 Type 0581 Type 0092
Hydrogen sulfide	Thiothrix I and II Type 021N Type 0914 Beggiatoa spp.
Nitrogen deficiency	Type 021N Thiothrix I and II
Phosphorus deficiency	N. limicola III H. hydrossis S. natans
Low pH	Fungi

=== Growth and Selection Theories ===
There are two selection theories on how the filamentous and floc-forming bacteria behave in its environment. Kinetic selection theory explains why the filamentous bacteria can outcompete the floc-bacteria in specific environmental conditions. Growth kinetics of filamentous bacteria and floc-forming bacteria are different. Filamentous bacteria have lower half-saturation constants (Ks) and lower maximum growth rates (μmax), which means it can utilize low substrates to outcompete the floc-forming bacteria when the system has low substrate concentrations. In contrast, the floc-forming bacteria can grow at a higher rate compared to the filamentous bacteria if the substrate concentration is high. To prevent the overabundance of the filamentous bacteria, the kinetics-based or high F/M selector design can be implemented so the floc-forming bacteria can exceed the filamentous bacteria before the mixed liquor enters the main aeration basin.

Another one is the diffusion selection theory that focuses on the morphological differences of the bacteria and the mass transfer of nutrients. Due to having filaments that can extend from the floc, filamentous bacteria can access substrates easier than the floc forming bacteria when the system has low DO or substrate concentrations. While floc-forming bacteria have disadvantages due to its relatively spherical shape, this makes it harder for oxygen and nutrients to diffuse to the center of the floc.

== Nonfilamentous or Viscous Bulking ==
Viscous bulking or zoogleal bulking is a type of non-filamentous bulking that is likely caused by the zoogloea sp. Viscous bulking occurs from a large amount of water-retentive, exocellular material. The Extracellular polymeric substance (EPS) surround the dispersed and flocculent bacteria, resulting in a slimy or jelly-like sludge consistency. Excessive water absorption in activated sludge results in slower settling and compaction of dispersed and flocculent microorganisms. Viscous bulking often occurs when the system has high amounts of carbohydrate levels while lacking nutrients such as nitrogen and phosphorus. The India ink reverse stain is a microscopic method used to visualize the viscous sludge.

== Engineering Control ==
Activated sludge bulking can be controlled using two main types of methods: nonspecific and specific. Nonspecific methods are quick, short-term solutions used to improve sludge settling right away. Because the methods not addressing the root cause, bulking often reoccurs after the treatment stop. These methods include changing the return activated sludge (RAS) flow, adding extra solids or chemicals to help particles stick together, and using disinfectants like chlorine or hydrogen peroxide to temporarily kill filamentous bacteria.

Nonspecific methods can improve sludge settling by including bypassing part of the influent to reduce hydraulic loading, increasing the return activated sludge (RAS) ratio to maintain biomass concentration, adjusting pH with lime or soda ash to suppress filamentous bacteria, and increasing aeration to raise dissolved oxygen levels.

An example of a nonspecific physical treatment method is the Freeze-Thaw Method, which involves repeatedly cooling and warming the sludge. This method requires no chemical additives and prevents secondary metal contamination from Fe3+/Al3+ salts. Consequently, it does not leave behind metal pollutants in the water, contributing to environmental sustainability. During the freezing stage, the formation and expansion of ice structures force small particles to come together, forming larger, heavier sludge clumps. The freezing process weakens the EPS, allowing retained water to be released and producing a denser sludge floc structure, thereby improving overall settling performance.

Specific methods are long-term solutions aimed at removing the root cause of bulking. To use these methods, the exact type of filamentous bacteria must first be identified. Then, the conditions in the aeration tank are adjusted to stop that bacteria from growing. This can include fixing nutrient imbalances, increasing dissolved oxygen levels, or using biological selectors to support the growth of healthy bacteria that form good sludge.

For permanent prevention, biological selectors are implemented at the start of treatment. These multi-stage mixing tanks, often designed with at least three compartments and a high food-to-microorganism (F/M) ratio, create an environment that favors the growth of healthy, floc-forming bacteria over filamentous species. By maintaining these specific conditions, the system can ensure a stable sludge density and consistent settling performance over time.

== Recent Developments ==
Wastewater treatment plants use different monitoring methods to detect sludge bulking and prevent system problems that can be divided into two major types: advanced biological techniques, such as Polymerase Chain Reaction (PCR), Fluorescence in situ hybridization (FISH), and high-throughput sequencing, and data-based approaches, including image analysis and computer modeling. Molecular methods give detailed information about microorganisms. PCR and high-throughput sequencing can quickly measure genes and show the whole microbial community, but it can be expensive, affected by contamination, and require complex data analysis. FISH can identify where specific microorganisms are located, but its signal can fade over time. On the other hand, algorithm-based methods allow continuous monitoring across the plant. Image analysis and data-driven models can provide real-time data and early warnings of bulking, but the accuracy depends on good-quality data and strong processing systems.

== See also ==
- Anaerobic digestion
- Membrane fouling
