= Siltation =

Water pollution caused by particulate terrestrial clastic material

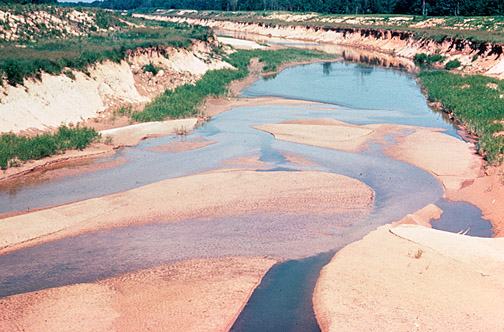
Siltation of a waterway

Siltation is water pollution caused by particulate terrestrial clastic material, with a particle size dominated by silt or clay. It refers both to the increased concentration of suspended sediments and to the increased accumulation (temporary or permanent) of fine sediments on bottoms where they are undesirable. Siltation is most often caused by soil erosion or sediment spill.

It is sometimes referred to by the ambiguous term "sediment pollution", which can also refer to a chemical contamination of sediments accumulated on the bottom, or to pollutants bound to sediment particles. Although "siltation" is not perfectly stringent, since it also includes particle sizes other than silt, it is preferred for its lack of ambiguity.

== Causes ==
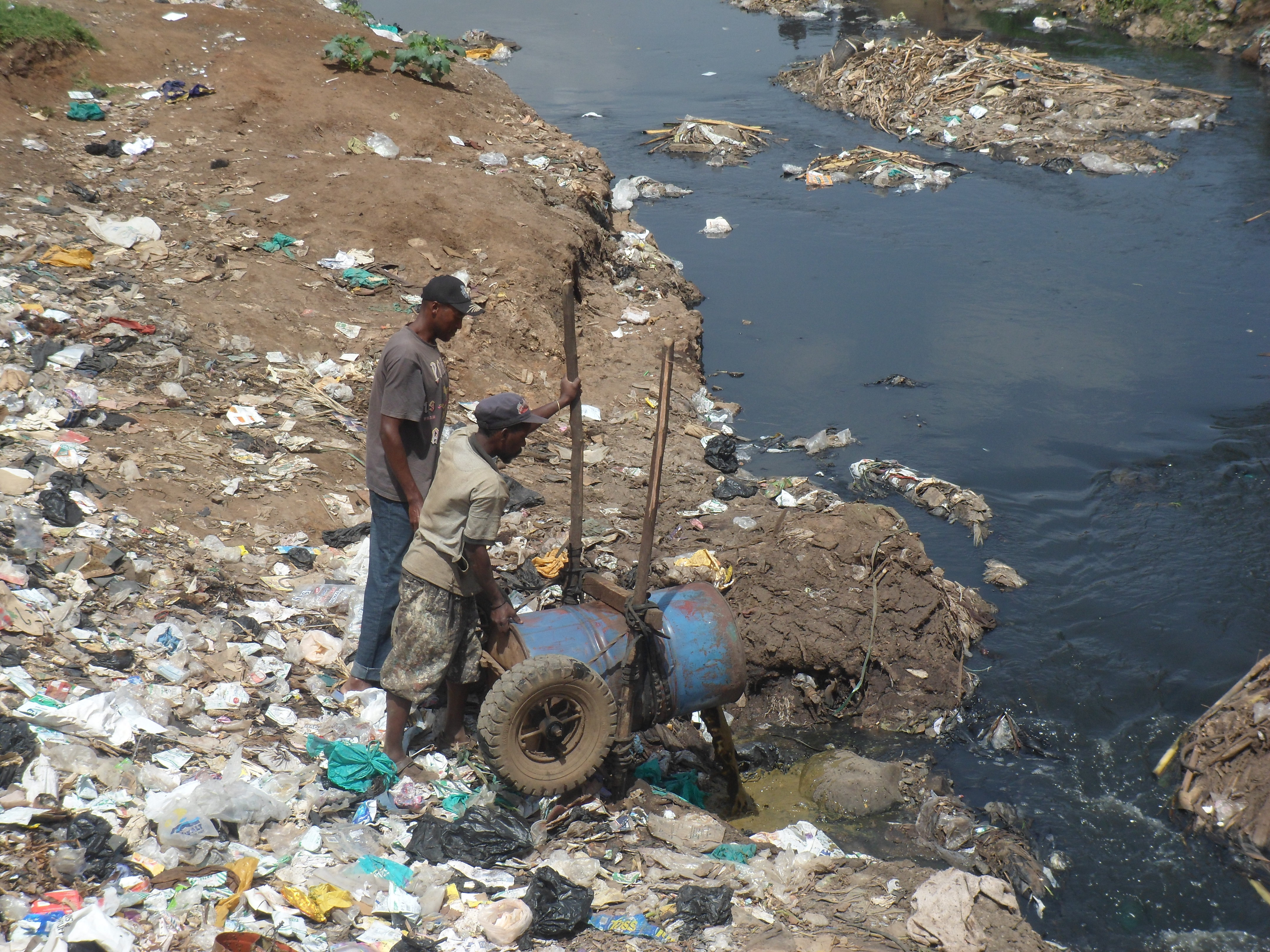
Siltation caused by fecal sludge collected from pit latrines and dumped into a river at the Korogocho slum in Nairobi, Kenya.

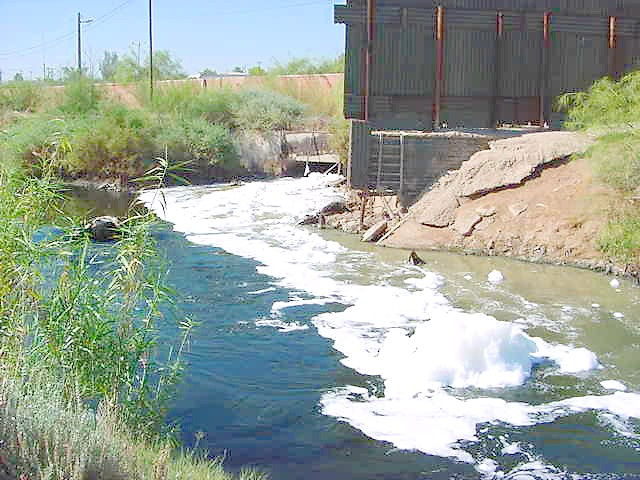
Siltation caused by raw sewage sludge and industrial waste in the New River as it passes from Mexicali to Calexico, California.

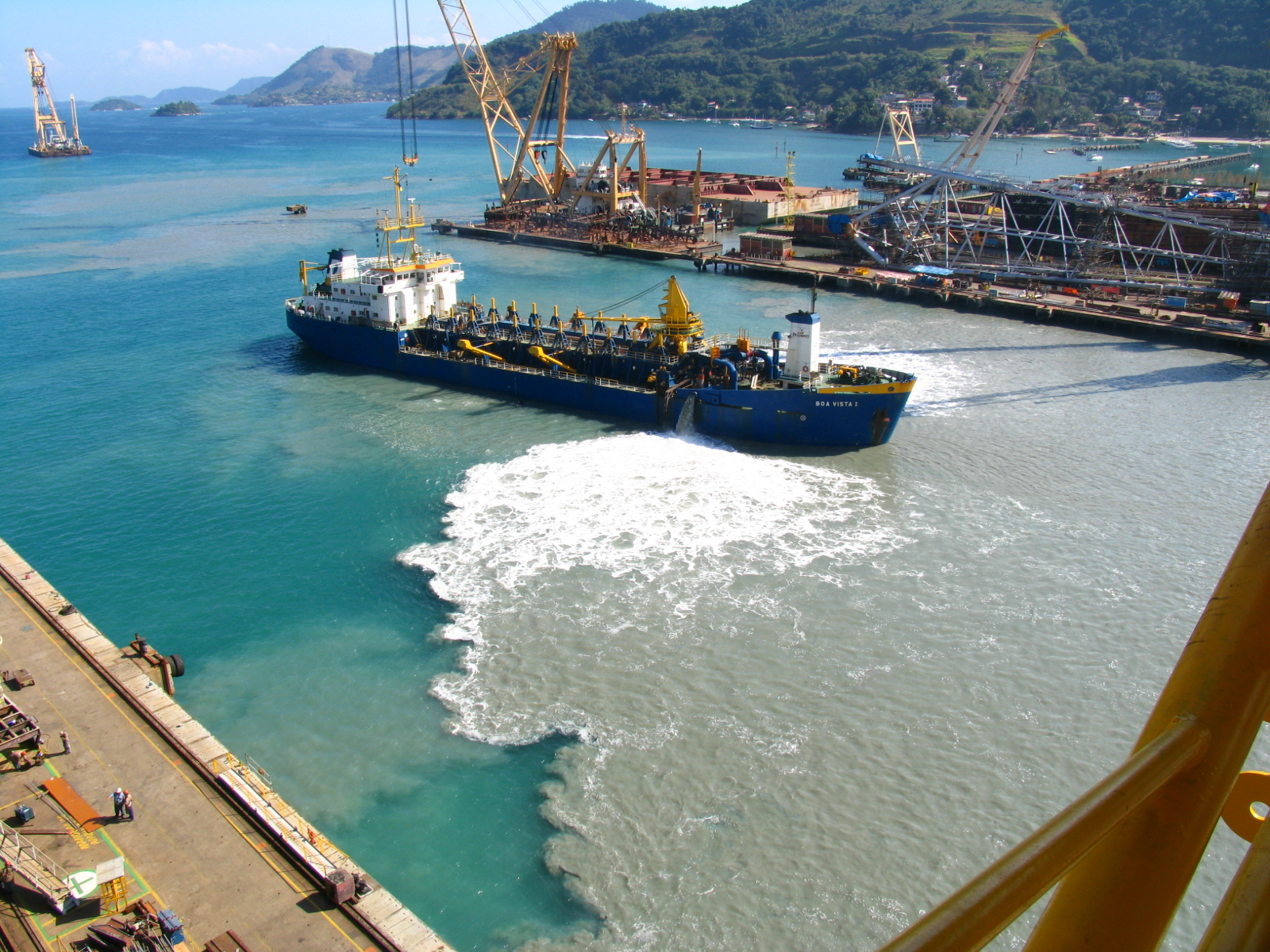
Siltation caused by sewage sludge from shipyard in Rio de Janeiro.

The origin of the increased sediment transport into an area may be erosion on land or activities in the water.

In rural areas, the erosion source is typically soil degradation by intensive or inadequate agricultural practices, leading to soil erosion, especially in fine-grained soils such as loess. The result will be an increased amount of silt and clay in the water bodies that drain the area. In urban areas, the erosion source is typically construction activities, which involve clearing the original land-covering vegetation and temporarily creating something akin to an urban desert from which fines are easily washed out during rainstorms.

In water, the main pollution source is sediment spill from dredging, the transportation of dredged material on barges, and the deposition of dredged material in or near water. Such deposition may be made to get rid of unwanted material, such as the offshore dumping of material dredged from harbours and navigation channels. The deposition may also be to build up the coastline, for artificial islands, or for beach replenishment.

Climate change also affects siltation rates.

Another important cause of siltation is the septage and other sewage sludges that are discharged from households or business establishments with no septic tanks or wastewater treatment facilities to bodies of water.

== Vulnerabilities ==
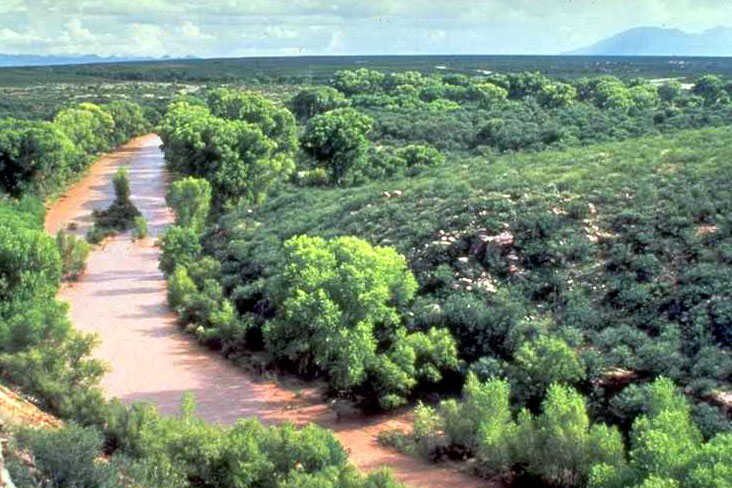
Silted river polluted by sediment.

While the sediment in transport is in suspension, it acts as a pollutant for those who require clean water, such as for cooling or in industrial processes, and it includes aquatic life that are sensitive to suspended material in the water. While nekton have been found to avoid spill plumes in the water (e.g. the environmental monitoring project during the building of the Øresund Bridge), filtering benthic organisms have no way of escape. Among the most sensitive organisms are coral polyps. Generally speaking, hard bottom communities and mussel banks (including oysters) are more sensitive to siltation than sand and mud bottoms. Unlike in the sea, in a stream, the plume will cover the entire channel, except possibly for backwaters, and so fish will also be directly affected in most cases.

Siltation can also affect navigation channels or irrigation channels. It refers to the undesired accumulation of sediments in channels intended for vessels or for distributing water.

== Measurement and monitoring ==
A sensor for measuring siltation in situ.

One may distinguish between measurements at the source, during transport, and within the affected area. Source measurements of erosion may be very difficult since the lost material may be a fraction of a millimeter per year. Therefore, the approach taken is typically to measure the sediment in transport in the stream, by measuring the sediment concentration and multiplying that with the discharge; for example, 50 mg/L (1.8×10^{−6} lb/cu in) times 30 m^{3}/s (1,100 cu ft/s) gives 1.5 kg/s (200 lb/min).

Also, sediment spill is better measured in transport than at the source. The sediment transport in open water is estimated by measuring the turbidity, correlating turbidity to sediment concentration (using a regression developed from water samples that are filtered, dried, and weighed), multiplying the concentration with the discharge as above, and integrating over the entire plume. To distinguish the spill contribution, the background turbidity is subtracted from the spill plume turbidity. Since the spill plume in open water varies in space and time, an integration over the entire plume is required, and repeated many times to get acceptably low uncertainty in the results. The measurements are made close to the source, in the order of a few hundred meters.

Anything beyond a work area buffer zone for sediment spill is considered the potential impact area. In the open sea, the impact of concern is almost exclusively with the sessile bottom communities since empirical data show that fish effectively avoid the impacted area. The siltation affects the bottom community in two main ways. The suspended sediment may interfere with the food gathering of filtering organisms, and the sediment accumulation on the bottom may bury organisms to the point that they starve or even die. It is only if the concentration is extreme that it decreases the light level sufficiently for impacting primary productivity. An accumulation of as little as 1 mm (0.039 in) may kill coral polyps.

While the effect of the siltation on the biota (once the harm is already done) can be studied by repeated inspection of selected test plots, the magnitude of the siltation process in the impact area may be measured directly by monitoring in real time. Parameters to measure are sediment accumulation, turbidity at the level of the filtering biota, and optionally incident light.

Siltation of the magnitude that it affects shipping can also be monitored by repeated bathymetric surveys.

== Mitigation ==
Resuspension of fines from a replenished beach causing siltation offshore

In rural areas, the first line of defense is to maintain land cover and prevent soil erosion in the first place. The second line of defense is to trap the material before it reaches the stream network (known as sediment control). In urban areas, the defenses are to keep land uncovered for as short a time as possible during construction and to use silt screens to prevent the sediment from getting released in water bodies.

During dredging, the spill can be minimized but not eliminated completely by the way the dredger is designed and operated. If the material is deposited on land, efficient sedimentation basins can be constructed. If it is dumped into relatively deep water, there will be a significant spill during dumping but not thereafter, and the spill that arises has minimal impact if there are only fine-sediment bottoms nearby.

One of the most difficult conflicts of interest to resolve, as regards siltation mitigation, is perhaps beach nourishment. When sediments are placed on or near beaches in order to replenish an eroding beach, any fines in the material will continue to be washed out for as long as the sand is being reworked. Since all replenished beaches are eroding or they would not need replenishment, they will contribute to nearshore siltation almost for as long as it takes to erode away what was added, albeit with somewhat decreasing intensity over time. Since the leakage is detrimental to coral reefs, the practice leads to a direct conflict between the public interest of saving beaches, and preserving any nearshore coral reefs. To minimize the conflict, beach replenishment should not be done with sand containing any silt or clay fractions. In practice the sand is often taken from offshore areas, and since the proportion of fines in sediments typically increases in the offshore direction, the deposited sand will inevitably contain a significant percentage of siltation-contributing fines.

It is desirable to minimize the siltation of irrigation channels by hydrologic design, the objective being not to create zones with falling sediment transport capacity, as that is conducive to sedimentation. Once sedimentation has occurred, in irrigation or navigation channels, dredging is often the only remedy.
