= SFD =

SFD may stand for:

- Sacramento Fire Department, Sacramento, California
- Salford Central railway station, Greater Manchester, England (National Rail station code)
- Seattle Fire Department, Seattle, Washington
- Software Freedom Day
- Start frame delimiter of an Ethernet frame
- Schwarze Filmschaffende in Deutschland, a professional association based in Berlin, Germany
- NYSE indicator of Smithfield Foods
- Snake fungal disease
- Spline Font Database, a FontForge font file format
- Shit flow diagram
- Stratford railway station, Victoria
- Seconds from Disaster, a US/UK-produced documentary series
