= Biological oxidizer =

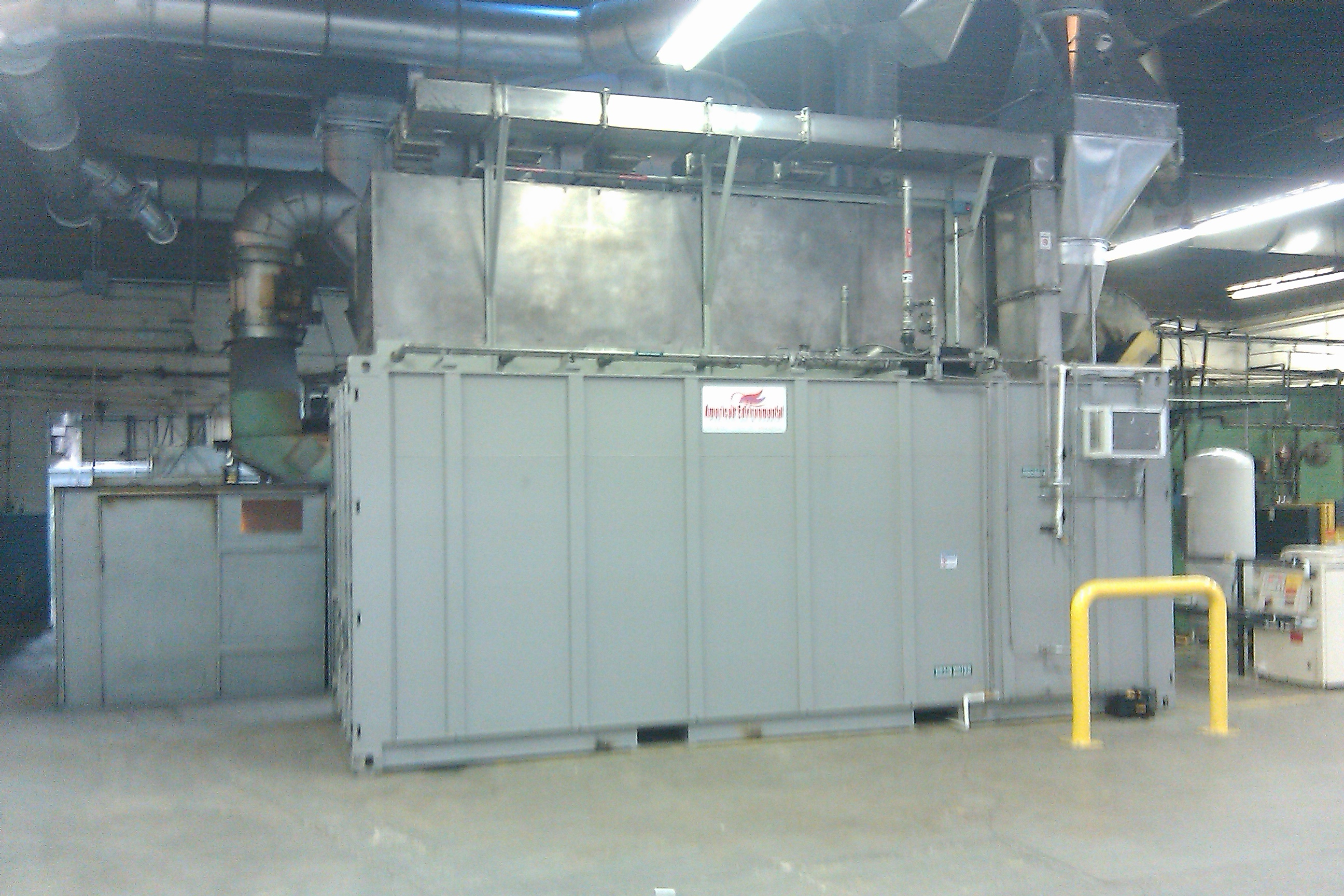
Advanced biological oxidizer for VOC and HAP removal

A biological oxidizer is a device that uses micro-organisms to treat wastewater and the volatile organic compounds produced by commercial and industrial operations. Biological oxidation devices convert biodegradable organic compounds into carbon dioxide and water. This is a natural occurring process which differs from traditional chemical and thermal oxidizing agents and methods. Some of the more commonly used micro-organisms are heterotrophic bacteria, which play an important role in biological degradation processes. Generally, these micro-organisms are rod shaped and facultative. Biological oxidizers provide a stable environment which allows bacteria to naturally oxidize and stabilize a large number of organics in a more efficient manner. Some of the emissions that may be treated biologically include:

- heterocyclic compounds (such as quinoline or pyridine);
- polyaromatic hydrocarbons (PAHs);
- pharmaceutical substances;
- polychlorinated biphenyls;
- hydrocarbons (oil);
- benzene, toluene, ethylbenzene, and xylene (BETEX);
- methyl ethyl ketone (MEK);
- some metals.

The prompt removal of a wide range of wastes and pollutants from the environment is the foremost requisite leading to minimal negative environmental impact and sustainability. Microorganisms offer excellent anabolic and catabolic adaptability to degrade and produce stabilized organic matters from contaminants. Microbiology is providing significant views of regulatory metabolic pathways as well as effectiveness to adaptation and biological degradation in our changing environment.

== Biological destruction mechanism of hazardous air pollutants ==
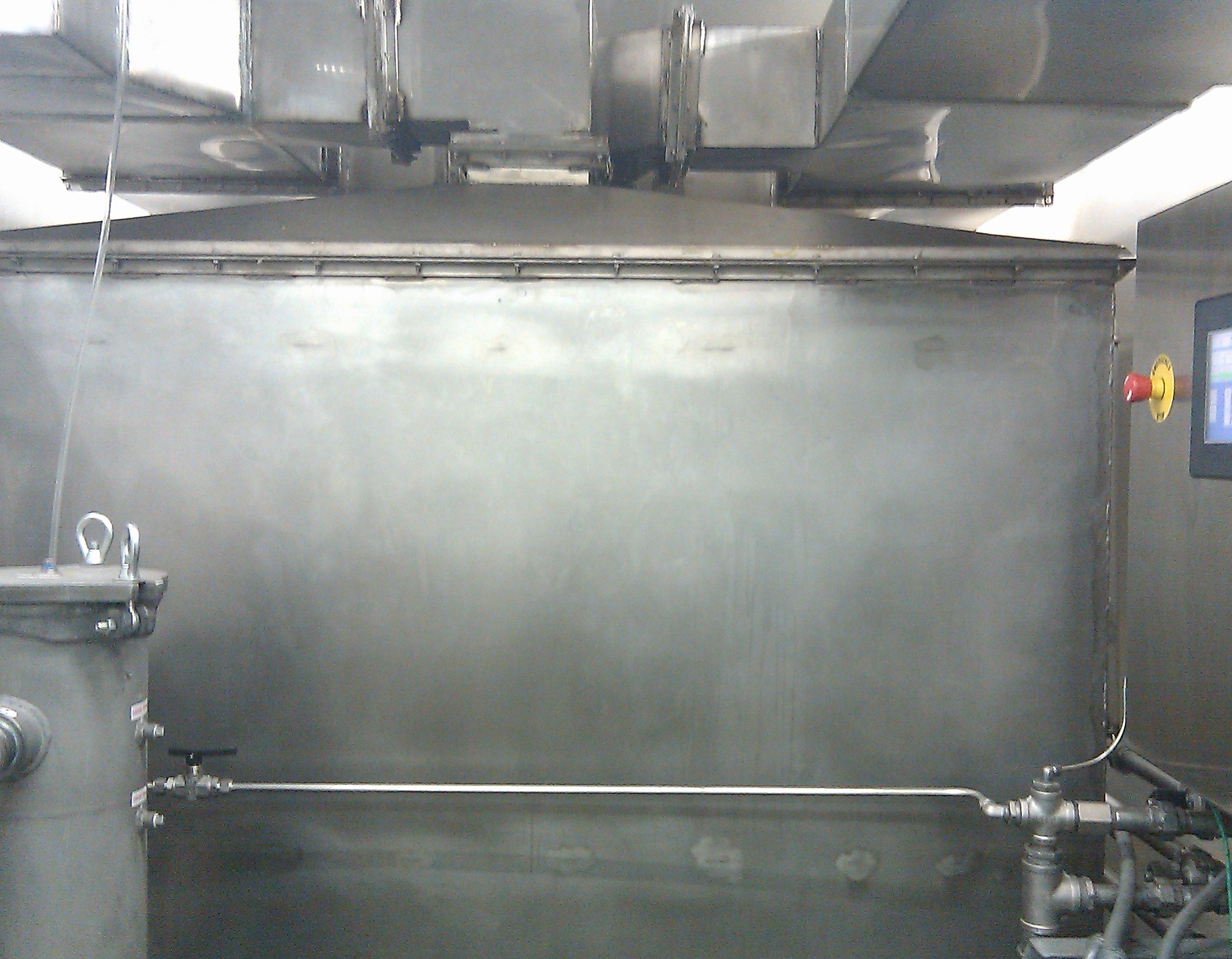
Biological oxidizer capture module

Micro-organisms are utilized in biological remediation to control industrial and commercial vapor effluents. When utilizing biological oxidation systems for the remediation emissions, the off gases or vapors are passed through a packed bed having a thin biological film at the surface. The micro-organisms are immobilized into the thin biological film, as the vapor passes over the film they become attached and are oxidized or stabilized.

The biological film accomplishes the degradation process, as the biological sump water is reprocessed over the biomedia it creates additional biological growth and as the film increases so does the biological oxidizers efficiency.

Large surface area and footprint were once required to treat waste water vapor and industrial plant emissions, with the advent of advanced biological oxidation equipment a smaller footprint is required. The footprint will typically occupy the same space as conventional thermal oxidizers.

== Biological controls ==
Excessive formation of the biological film may lead to certain problems such as sloughing, it is an important factor to maintain optimum biological film. Maintaining the biological film is accomplished by proper moisture content. For this purpose the humidity of the air is adjusted within the reaction chamber before the vapor flows over the packing media. The biological packing media may be natural or made of synthetic plastic. Recirculation of the water is always completed in the biological oxidation system to make the system more cost-effective. Biochemical oxygen demand (BOD) indirectly measures the amount of easily biodegradable organic matters thus very low values indicate direct waste water disposal.

The prompt removal of a wide range of wastes and pollutants from the waste gas flow is the foremost requirement of biological oxidizers to meet regulatory permitting requirements. Micro-organisms differ in their ability to rapidly metabolize different pollutants, so the selection of the proper mix of organisms is critical. Research is underway to genetically modify various organisms to improve their performance in biological oxidation.

== Benefits of biological oxididation ==
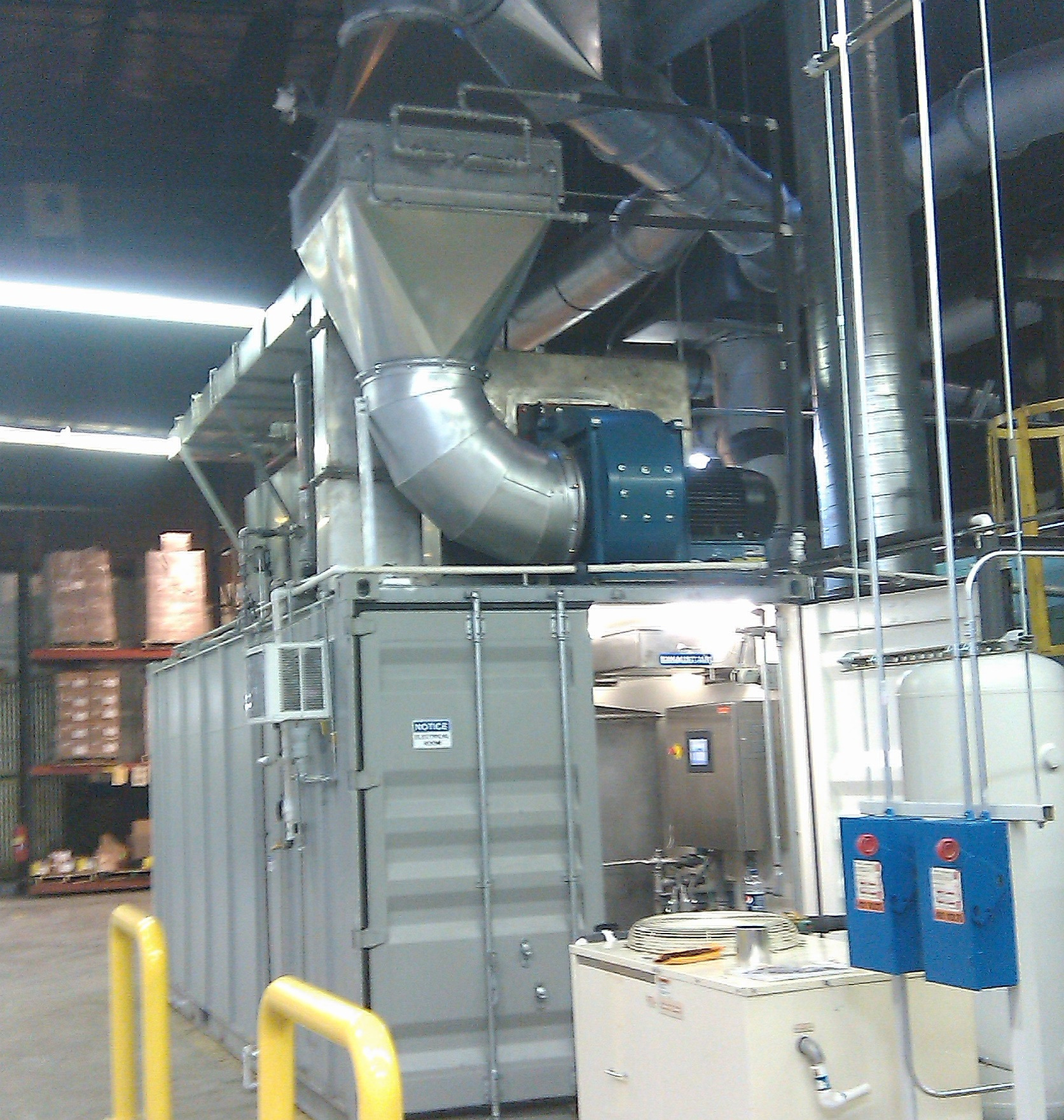
Biological oxidation system

Biological oxidation of organic matters has led to the innovation of a low cost secondary treatment of the waste water emissions and industrial air emissions. The process of biodegradation offers a very fast method which typically offers 4,000 catalytic cycles per minute. Destruction rate efficiency is generally greater than 99% on most biodegradable organics emissions. The biological oxidation technology is free from secondary emissions (NO_{x}) with limited CO_{2} production. While other oxidation technologies such as thermal oxidation produces CO, NO_{2} and CO_{2}.

== List of manufacturers ==
The following manufacturers have been involved in the development, design and planning of waste gas purification systems for a wide range of industries: Global manufacture of turnkey systems.

- American Fabrication and Supply, LLC

== See also ==
- Bacteria
- Microbiology
- Microorganism

== Further reading and external links ==
- McGrew, Roderick. Encyclopedia of Medical History (1985), brief history pp 25–30
- Our Microbial Planet A free poster from the National Academy of Sciences about the positive roles of micro-organisms.
- "Uncharted Microbial World: Microbes and Their Activities in the Environment" Report from the American Academy of Microbiology
- Understanding Our Microbial Planet: The New Science of Metagenomics A 20-page educational booklet providing a basic overview of metagenomics and our microbial planet.
- Tree of Life Eukaryotes
- Microbe News from Genome News Network
- Medical Microbiology On-line textbook
- Through the microscope: A look at all things small On-line microbiology textbook by Timothy Paustian and Gary Roberts, University of Wisconsin-Madison
- Microorganisms in the pond water on YouTube
