= Fecal sludge management =

Collection, transport, and treatment of fecal sludge from onsite sanitation systems

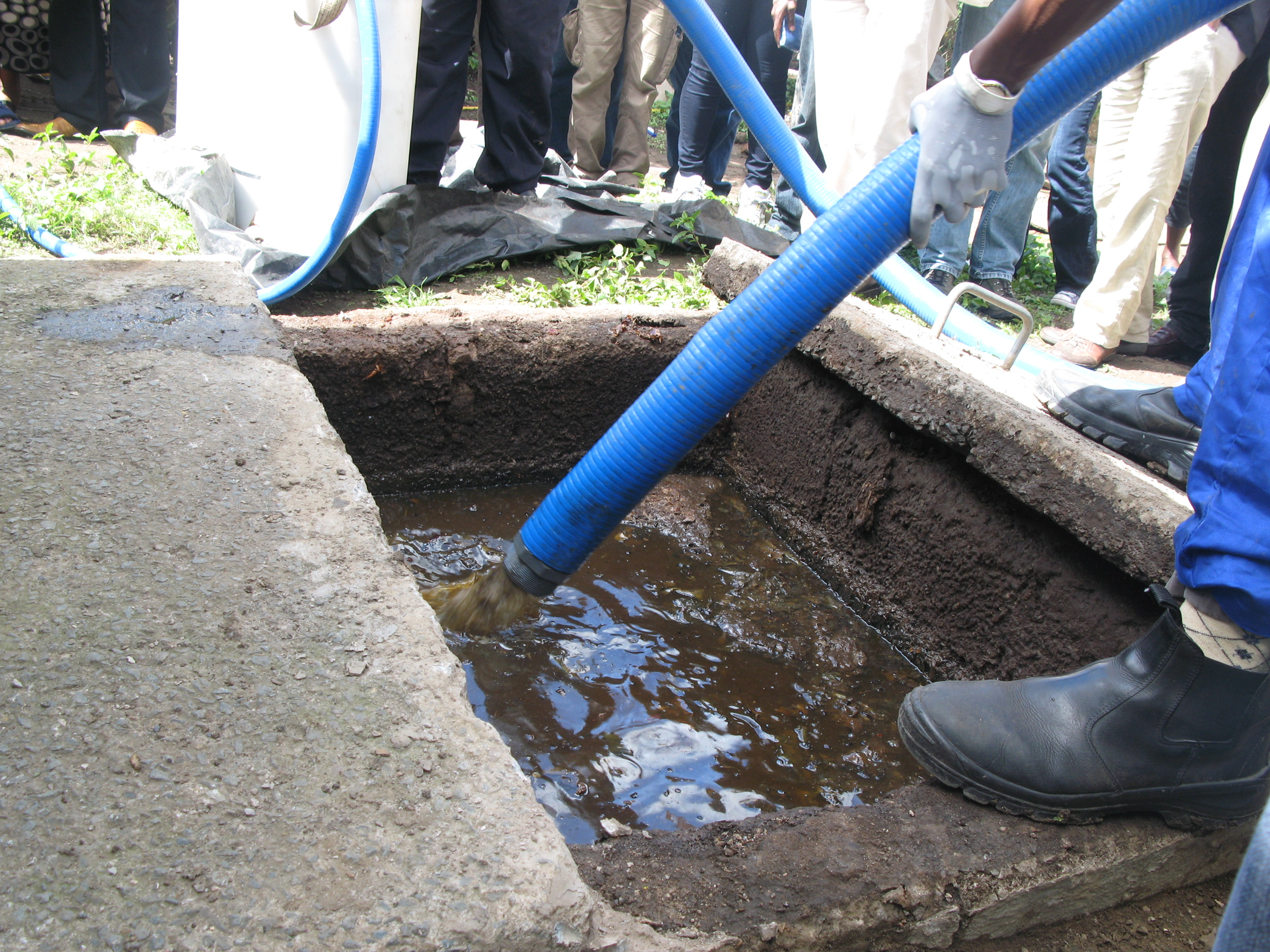
Fecal sludge being pumped out of a pit latrine in Durban, South Africa

Fecal sludge management (FSM) is the storage, collection, transport, treatment and safe end use or disposal of fecal sludge. Together, the collection, transport, treatment and end use of fecal sludge constitute the "value chain" or "service chain" of fecal sludge management. Fecal sludge is defined very broadly as what accumulates in onsite sanitation systems (e.g. pit latrines, septic tanks and container-based solutions) and specifically is not transported through a sewer. It is composed of human excreta, but also anything else that may go into an onsite containment technology, such as flushwater, cleansing materials (e.g. toilet paper and anal cleansing materials), menstrual hygiene products, grey water (i.e. bathing or kitchen water, including fats, oils and grease), and solid waste. Fecal sludge that is removed from septic tanks is called septage.

It is estimated that one-third of the world's population is served by onsite sanitation, and that in low-income countries less than 10% of urban areas are served by sewers. In low-income countries, the majority of fecal sludge is discharged untreated into the urban environment, placing a huge burden on public and environmental health. Hence, FSM plays a critical role in safely managed sanitation and the protection of public health. FSM services are provided by a range of formal and informal private sector services providers, local governments, water authorities, and public utilities. This can also result in unreliable services with relatively high costs at the household level.

Although new technology now allows for fecal sludge to be treated onsite (see Mobile Treatment Units below) the majority of fecal sludge is collected and either disposed of into the environment or treated offsite. Fecal sludge collection can be arranged on a scheduled basis or on a call-for-service basis (also known as on-demand, on-request, or non-scheduled services). The collected fecal sludge may be manually or mechanically emptied, and then transported to treatment plants with a vacuum truck, a tank and pump mounted on a flatbed truck, a small tank pulled by a motorcycle, or in containers on a handcart. The wider use of multiple decentralized sludge treatment facilities within cities (to avoid long haulage distances) is currently being researched and piloted.

Fecal sludge is different to wastewater and cannot simply be co-treated at sewage treatment plants. Small additions of fecal sludge are possible if plants are underutilized and able to take the additional load, and facilities to separate liquids and solids are available. A variety of mechanized and non-mechanized processing technologies may be used, including settling tanks, planted and unplanted drying beds, and waste stabilization ponds. The treatment process can produce resource recovery end-products such as treated effluent that can be used for irrigation, co-composting as a soil conditioner, anaerobic digestion for the production of biogas, forms of dry-combustion fuel such as pellets or biochar, charcoal, biodiesel, sludge and plants or protein production as animal fodder.

== Definitions ==
Fecal sludge management refers to the storage, collection, transport, treatment, and safe end use or disposal of fecal sludge. Collectively, the collection, transport, treatment and end use or reuse of excreta constitute the "value chain" of fecal sludge management.

=== Fecal sludge ===
Fecal sludge is defined very broadly as what accumulates in onsite sanitation technologies and specifically is not transported through a sewer. It is composed of human excreta, but also anything else that may go into an onsite containment technology, such as flushwater, cleansing materials and menstrual hygiene products, grey water (i.e. bathing or kitchen water, including fats, oils and grease), and solid waste. Hence, fecal sludge is highly variable, with a very wide range of quantities (i.e. produced and accumulated volumes) and qualities (i.e. characteristics). Fecal sludge is stored onsite, and is periodically collected and transported to a fecal sludge treatment plant, followed by safe disposal or end use. When safely managed, fecal sludge that is collected from pit latrines can also be called "pit latrine sludge", whereas fecal sludge collected from septic tanks can also be called "septic tank sludge" or "septage".

=== Septage ===
Septage or "septic tank sludge" is fecal sludge that is accumulated and stored in a septic tank. Septage tends to be more dilute, as septic tanks are typically used with flush toilets (blackwater) and can also include grey water. Septic tanks also tend to have less solid waste, as they only receive things that can be flushed down a toilet (e.g. toilet paper). When operating as designed, a sludge blanket layer accumulates on the bottom of the tank, a scum layer that contains fats, oil and grease accumulates at the top, and the effluent or supernatant contains less solids.

Septage is periodically removed (with a frequency depending on tank capacity, system efficiency, and usage level, but typically less often than annually) from the septic tanks by specialized vehicles known as vacuum trucks. They pump the septage out of the tank, and transport it to a local fecal sludge treatment plant. It can also be used by farmers for fertilizer, or stored in large septage waste storage facilities for later treatment or use on crops.

The term "septage" has been used in the United States since at least 1992. It has also been used in projects by the United States Agency for International Development in Asia. Another definition of septage is: "A historical term to define sludge removed from septic tanks."

In India some government policy documents are using the term FSSM for "Fecal sludge and septage management".

== Purposes and benefits ==
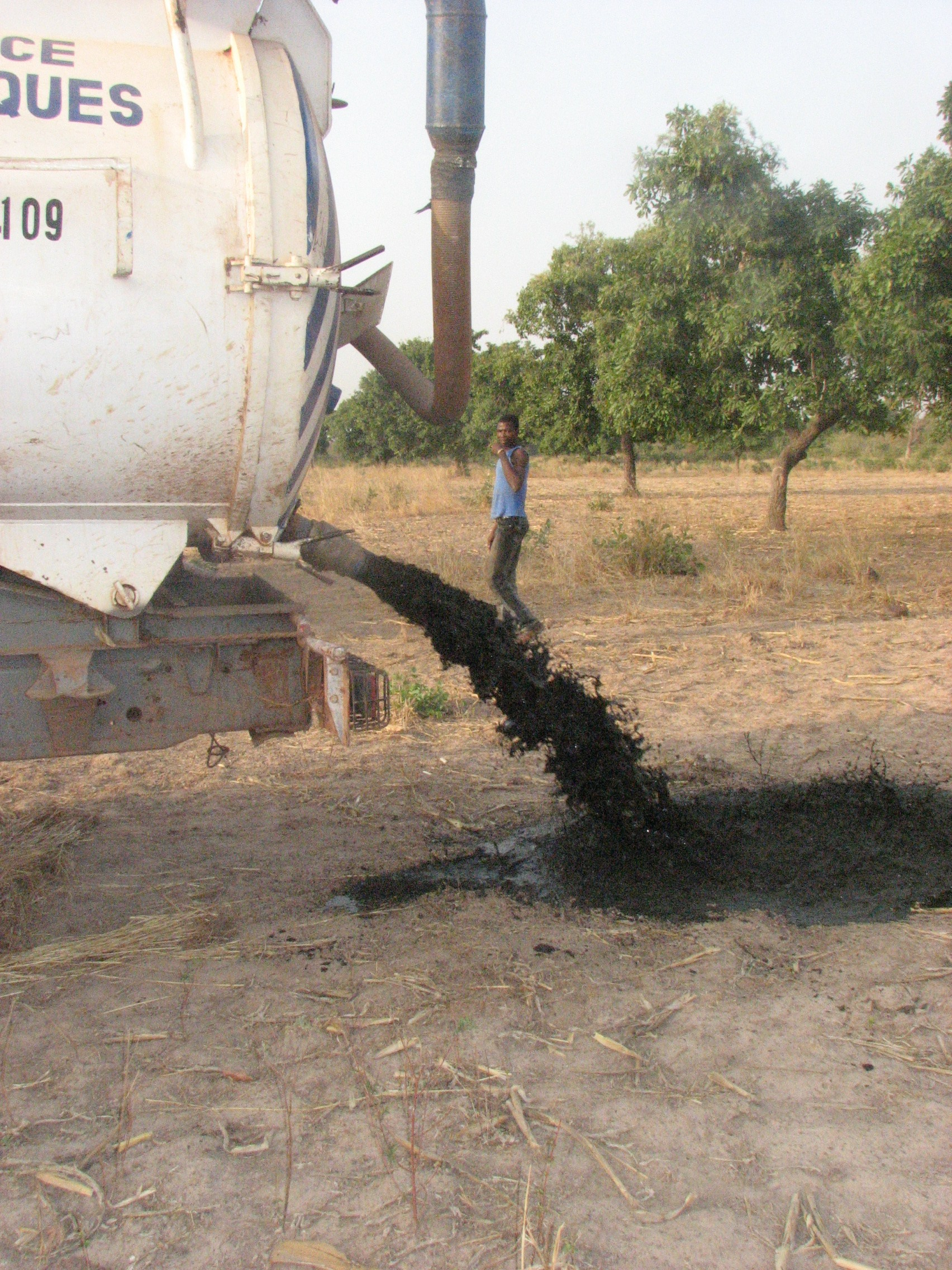
Lack of fecal sludge management: Discharge of fecal sludge into the environment in Burkina Faso

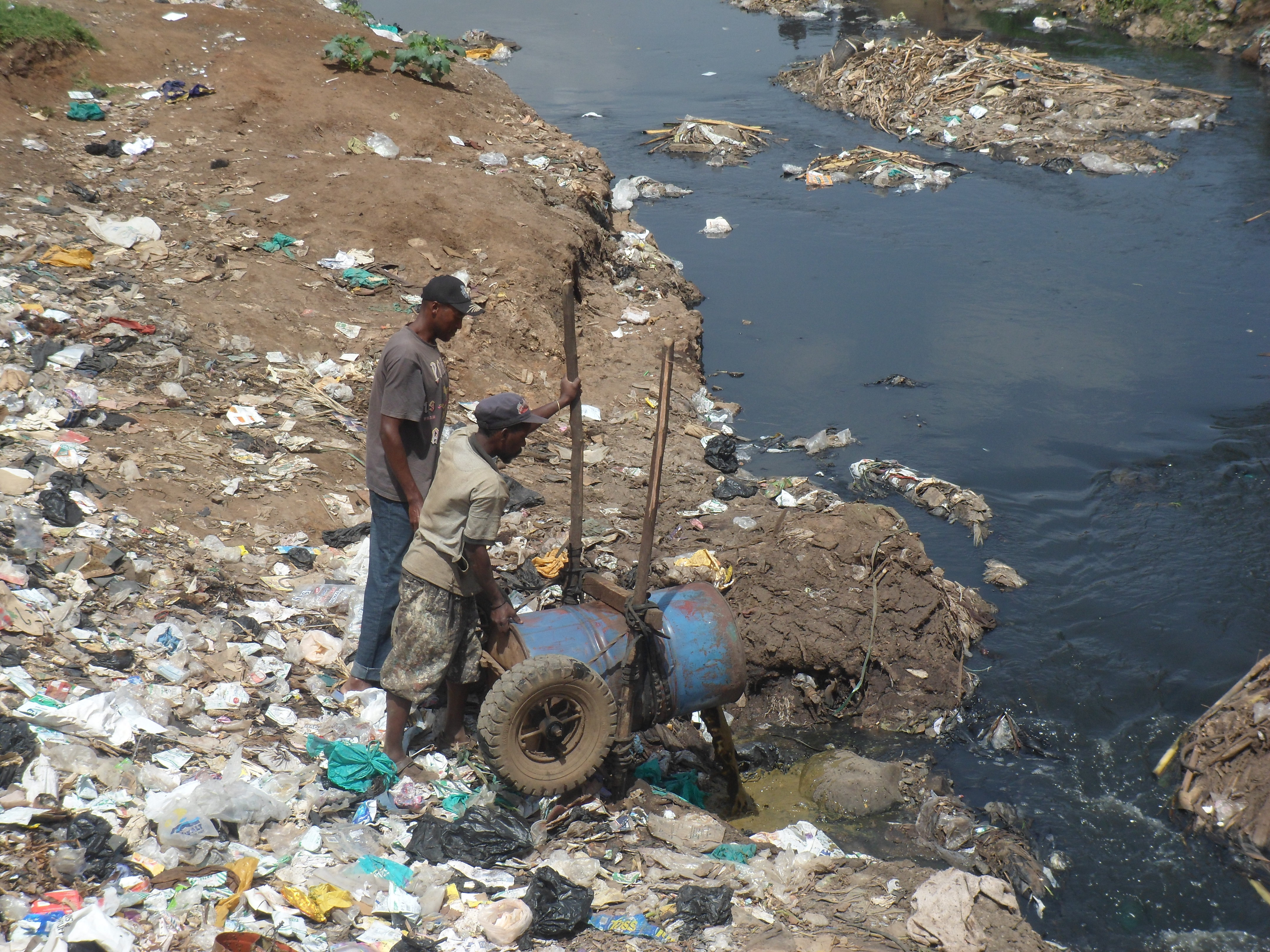
Example of lacking fecal sludge management: Fecal sludge collected from pit latrines is dumped into a river at the Korogocho slum in Nairobi, Kenya.

The overall goal of FSM is the protection of public and environmental health. FSM forms a key component of city-wide inclusive sanitation (CWIS), which considers all types of sanitation technologies in order to provide equitable, safe, and sustainable sanitation for everyone. CWIS employs a service delivery approach along the entire service chain, rather than just infrastructure provision.

Adequately and safely managed fecal sludge has the following benefits:

- Reduce the potential for human contact with fecal-borne pathogens by improving the functioning of onsite sanitation systems;
- Minimize odors and nuisances, and the uncontrolled discharge of organic matter from overflowing tanks or pits;
- Reduce indiscriminate disposal of collected fecal sludge;
- Production and sale of the end-products of the sludge treatment process. These products may include recycled water for agriculture and industry, soil conditioners from composting or co-composting materials, and energy products such as biogas, biodiesel, charcoal pellets, industrial powdered fuel, or electricity.
- Stimulate economic development, and job creation and livelihood opportunities, while addressing the issues of the social stigma and operator health and safety that continue to impact informal workers. This can also include jobs for contractors and equipment installers; for sanitation workers such as sludge collection personnel including drivers and emptiers; and for treatment and reuse systems operators.

=== Developments in the sector ===
Since the wider recognition of the importance of sanitation, marked by the UN declaring 2008 as the 'Year of Sanitation', there has been a steady increase in commitment, uptake, implementation, and knowledge generation in non-sewered sanitation. The incorporation of the entire sanitation management service chain in the Sustainable Development Goal (SDG) 6, as opposed to just providing access to toilets, has further established acknowledge of the importance of FSM. The SDGs were launched in 2015, and SDG 6 is for "clean water and sanitation for all by 2030"), launched in 2015, has further established acknowledgement of its importance. There has also been an increase in the incorporation of fecal sludge management in national regulations and development agency agendas, increased funding from foundations and governments, and implementation of infrastructure and service provision.

There has been a rapid increase in evidence-based research and journal publications on the topic (e.g. for Africa and Asia). There are rapidly evolving technology developments along the entire service chain. Some have the potential to alter the existing service chain, such as container-based sanitation, decentralized options, and innovations developed through the Bill & Melinda Gates Foundation 'Reinvent the Toilet Challenge' since at least 2012.

Curriculums have been, and are continuing to be, developed and implemented. Initiatives include the Global Sanitation Graduate School, and freely available online courses, such as the Sandec MOOC series.

In 2014, the SFD Initiative, funded by a grant by the Bill and Melinda Gates Foundation, was created to develop and promote the use of shit flow diagrams.

== Challenges ==
In many LMICs, fecal sludge is still not properly managed. This may be due to a lack of mandated institutions and low awareness of the impact of poor sanitation; a lack of technical expertise and experience; an inability to source funds for to purchase of vacuum trucks and treatment, as well as a lack of knowledge necessary to initiate and implement successful FSM programs. Another factor is that the transporting fecal sludge has a real cost to vacuum truck operators and there is thus an incentive to dispose of the untreated waste into the environment (primarily into waterways, but also directly onto the land.) Failure to properly manage fecal sludge can result in the poor performance of onsite sanitation facilities (OSSFs), fecal sludge overflowing from containments, and the unsafe emptying and dumping of untreated fecal sludge into the environment.

Fecal sludge contains pathogens, can generate odors, and causes surface water pollution, as well as groundwater pollution.

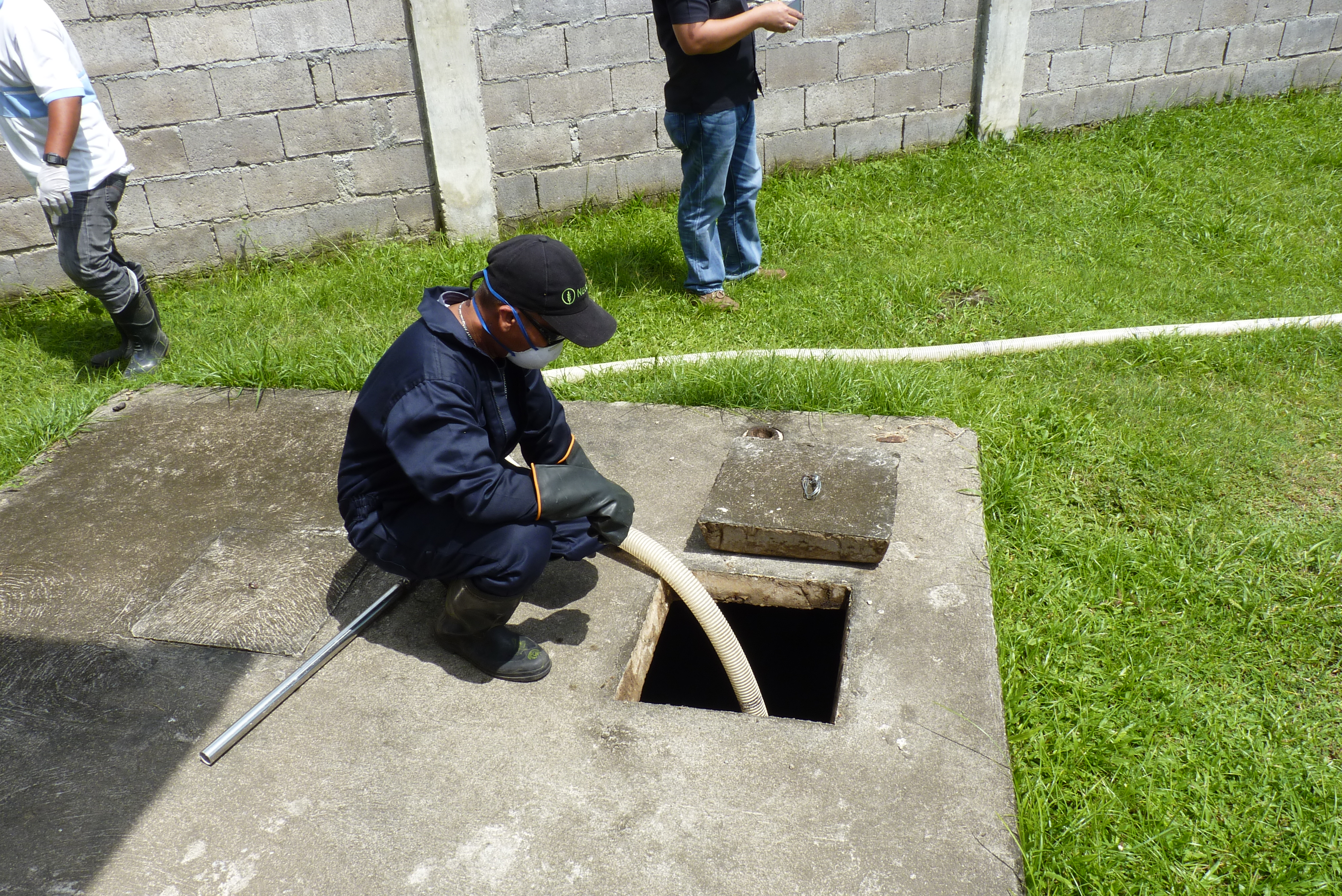
Desludging using proper personal protective equipment in Dumaguete, Philippines

== Components ==
Fecal sludge management (FSM) requires safe and hygienic septic tank and pit latrine emptying services, along with the effective treatment of solids and liquids and the reuse of treated produce where possible. It may include a range of options including on-site and offsite treatment, and the dispersal or capture and further processing of the products of the treatment process into such as biogas, compost and energy.

=== By type of dwellings ===
==== Cities ====
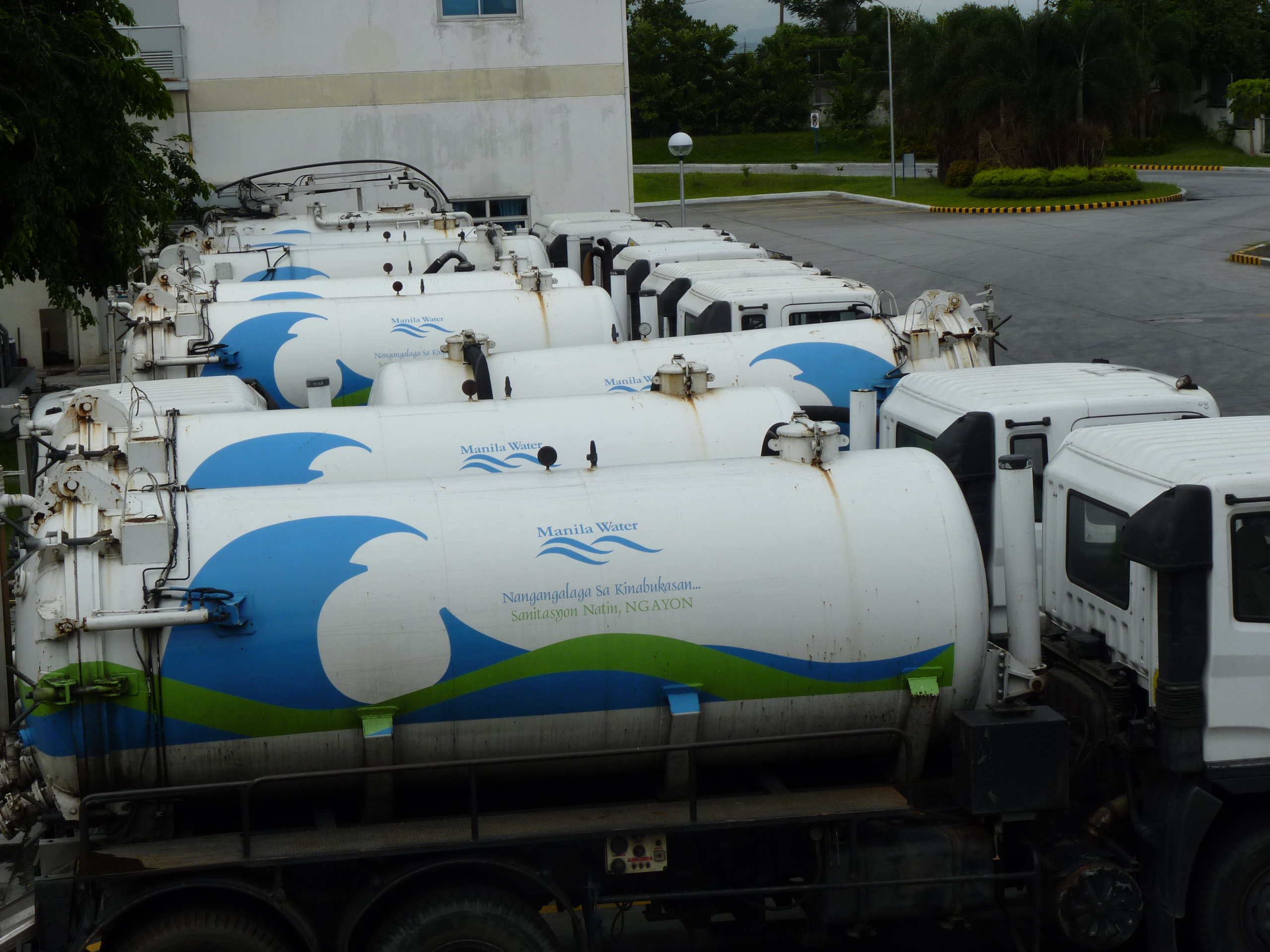
Fleet of vacuum trucks used for desludging services by Manila Water in Manila, Philippines

FSM is a critical sanitation service in cities and towns in all countries where households use onsite sanitation systems. Citywide FSM programs may utilize multiple or one treatment facility, use stationary and mobile transfer stations, and engage with micro, small and medium-sized enterprises that may conduct some or all of the services. Programs may be phased in over time to accommodate growing demand.

==== Peri urban areas ====
Peri urban areas are often less densely populated than urban centers. Therefore, they have more space and on-site sanitation systems can be effective for solid and liquid treatment. In most such peri-urban areas, it is less likely that they will be connected to a conventional centralized sewerage system in the short or medium term. Therefore, these areas will rely on a mix of onsite-sanitation systems and services, decentralized wastewater management systems, or by condominial or simplified sewerage connected to decentralized or centralized treatment. In all of these situations, FSM is a necessary service to keep the sanitation systems functioning properly.

==== Rural areas ====
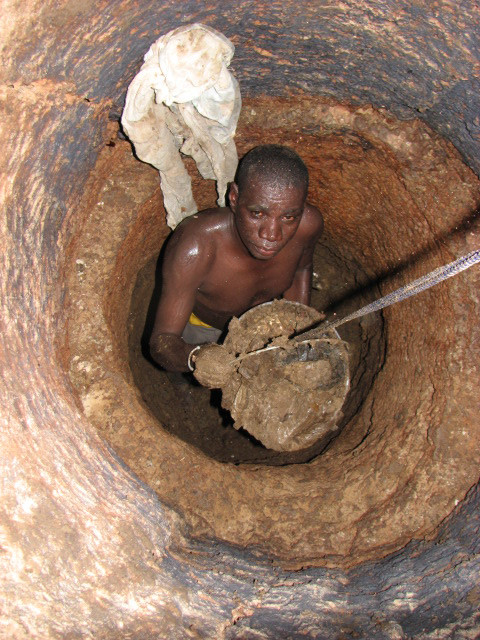
Bad practice example: A worker removing fecal sludge out of the pit of a pit latrine without wearing any personal protective equipment (in a village in Burkina Faso)

Rural areas with low population density may not need formal FSM services if the local practice is to cover and rebuild latrines when they fill up. However, if this is not possible, rural areas often lack treatment facilities within a reasonable (say 30 minutes drive) distance; are difficult for tankers to access and often have limited demand for emptying making transport and treatment uneconomic, and unaffordable for most people. Therefore, options such as relocating latrines on-site, double (alternating) pit or Arborloo toilets could be considered. Also sharing decentralized FSM services and sludge treatment between nearby villages, or direct safe removal burial of waste could be considered and organized.

=== Alternatives to fecal sludge producing systems ===
Most types of dry toilets (except for pit latrines) do not generate fecal sludge but generate instead dried feces (in the case of urine-diverting dry toilets) or compost (in the case of composting toilets). For example, in the case of Arborloo toilets, nothing is ever extracted from the pit and, instead, the lightweight outhouse superstructure is moved to another shallow hole and a tree is planted on top of the filled hole.

== Management aspects ==
=== Selecting the operator of FSM services ===
FSM services are usually provided by formal and informal private sector service providers, local governments, water authorities and utilities. Water utilities with a high percentage of water connectivity (homes with piped water connections) are logical operators of FSM programs. If water is sold to customers through a tariff, an additional tariff to cover FSM services may be added. For larger cities, it is usually the water and sewerage service provider that will be the most appropriate operator.

Local governments may choose to provide services by using their own staff and resources for collection, transportation and treatment. This is often the case in smaller cities or municipalities where the water utility may not have a broad reach. In many cases, cooperation between the city government and the water utility may be strategically advantageous. Dumaguete City, Philippines, is one example where the Water District (utility) and Local Government have joint ownership and responsibilities for the FSM program. Organized larger scale FSM programs may be able to provide the service more cheaply and more hygienically than the independent private operators working on an ad hoc basis. Ensuring services are affordable is an important selling point when promoting the program to citizens and encouraging them to participate.

The local private sector is an important player in providing FSM services. In such cases, private sector contractors may work directly for households (under regulation) or bid on desludging contracts let by the city. The private sector can also provide services in operating and maintaining the treatment works, and in processing and selling the commodities resulting from the treatment process. San Fernando City, La Union, Philippines is an example of a local government that has contracted out the treatment facility construction and collection program to the private sector.

=== Scheduled desludging programs ===
Scheduled desludging is a planned effort by the local government or utility to ensure regular desludging of septic tanks. In this process, every property is covered along a defined route and the property occupiers are informed in advance about desludging that will take place. The actual desludging (or emptying of septic tanks) can be done through a public private partnership (PPP) arrangement.

In Southeast Asia, there is (in 2016) increasing interest in scheduled desludging programs as a means of providing services. A WSP study recommended that efforts to introduce scheduled emptying should focus first on areas where demand was greatest, moving on to other areas when the success of scheduled emptying had been demonstrated in these areas. Analysis of pit and tank desludging records for Palu in Indonesia revealed that existing demand for desludging services varied between sub-districts, with demand being greatest in well-established areas and least in urban fringe areas.

There are multiple benefits of scheduled desludging services in the Indian context: Achieves the norms through regular desludging, reduces high prices of desludging, removes the need for manual labor, improves environmental and public health impacts, links with local taxes rather than with user charges. Scheduled desludging has been initiated in several Asian countries including the Philippines, Malaysia, Vietnam, Indonesia, and India. A program by SNV (Netherlands Development Organisation) has developed scheduled emptying services in Indonesia, Nepal and Bangladesh as part of a broader urban sanitation program during 2014–2017.

=== Elements of successful programs ===
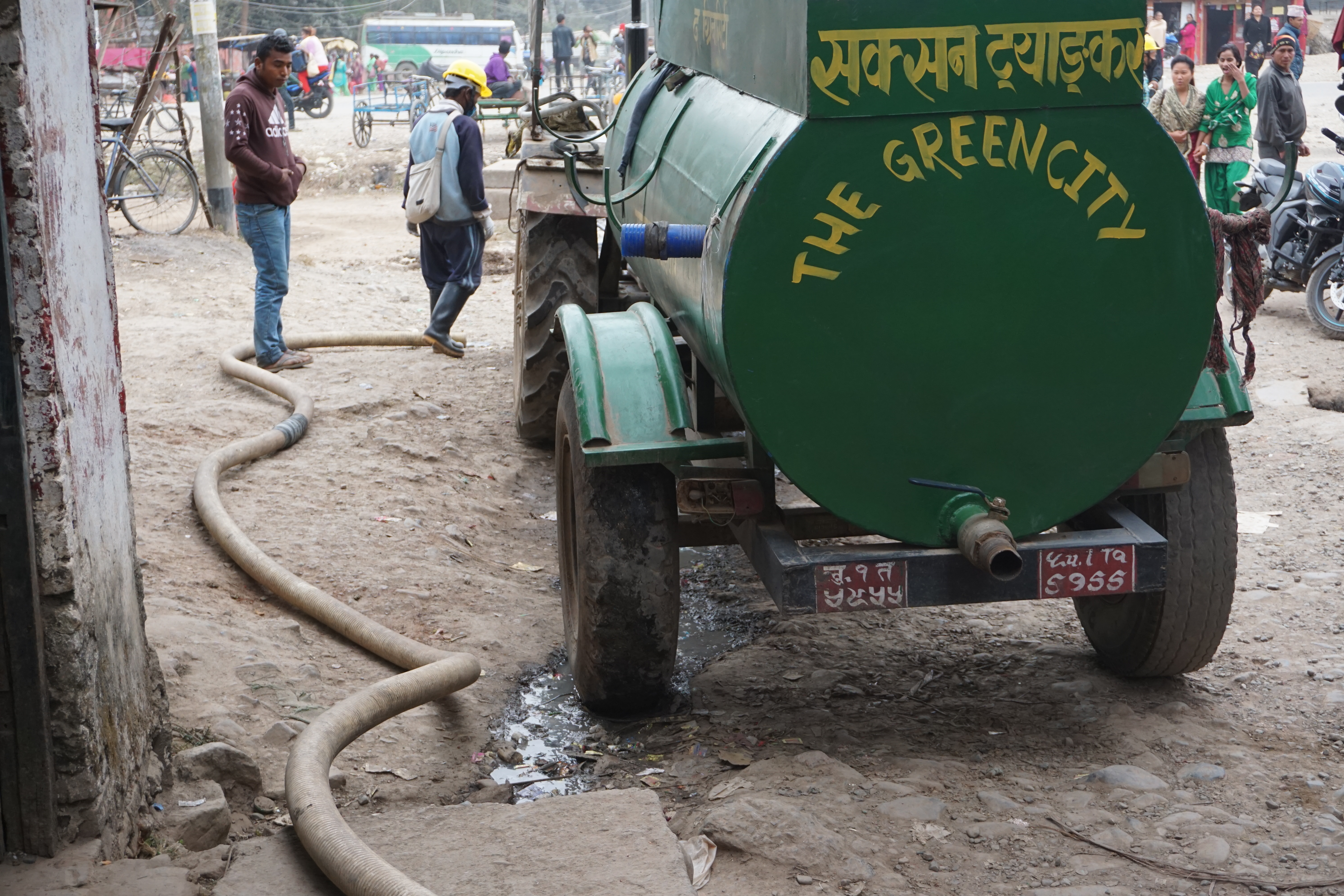
Desludging truck (vacuum truck) in action in Nepal

FSM services can be provided as demand based (often called on-request, on-call, on-demand, ad-hoc or non-scheduled) or scheduled (also known as regular) desludging, or a combination of both. Under either mechanism, OSSFs are desludged on a periodic basis or when the household requests it or due to inspection by a competent authority indicates desludging is needed.

An analysis of 20 FSM Innovation Case Studies and research and advocacy of successful programs carried out by Oxfam Philippines has demonstrated that common elements for successful FSM programs include:

- Well formulated and practical policy, rules and regulation: While these are essential they are almost useless, even counterproductive, on their own, and must be supported by complementary factors such as those below;
- Local leadership and clearly mandated and resourced institutions to manage services, even where actual services are delivered by the private sector;
- Partnerships between stakeholders contributes to developing services at scale, building community confidence and achieving sustainability;
- A sustained program of community engagement, marketing and awareness raising is as essential to FSM as sludge treatment – but is frequently under-valued, under-budgeted and sometimes abandoned after an initial period;
- Capacity-building for FSM service providers helps ensure that they can effectively meet all segments of demand and achieve long-term viability. This may include training in both technical matters and business management, and the facilitation of capital formation through grants, equipment leasing, loan guarantees and other financial instruments;
- Tariffs that are pro-poor and representative of operational costs for providing the service;
- Technology that is appropriate to the capacity to operate and maintain the system and the realities of the value chain.

=== Sanitation workers ===
Sanitation workers are the people responsible for cleaning, maintaining, operating, or emptying a sanitation technology at any step of the sanitation chain. These workers contribute to safe fecal sludge management.

A sanitation worker (or sanitary worker) is a person responsible for cleaning, maintaining, operating, or emptying the equipment or technology at any step of the sanitation chain. This is the definition used in the narrower sense within the WASH sector. More broadly speaking, sanitation workers may also be involved in cleaning streets, parks, public spaces, sewers, stormwater drains, and public toilets. Another definition is: "The moment an individual's waste is outsourced to another, it becomes sanitation work." Some organizations use the term specifically for municipal solid waste collectors, whereas others exclude the workers involved in management of solid waste (rubbish, trash) sector from its definition.

Sanitation workers are essential in maintaining safe sanitation services in homes, schools, hospitals, and other settings and protecting public health but face many health risks in doing so, including from exposure to a wide range of biological and chemical agents. Additionally, they may be at risk of injury from heavy labor, poor and prolonged postures and positions and confined spaces, as well as psychosocial stress. These risks are exacerbated under conditions of poverty, illness, poor nutrition, poor housing, child labor, migration, drug and alcohol abuse, discrimination, social stigma and societal neglect. In many developing countries, sanitation workers are "more vulnerable due to unregulated or unenforced environmental and labor protections, and lack of occupational health and safety".

== Transport options ==
=== Collection vehicles and equipment ===
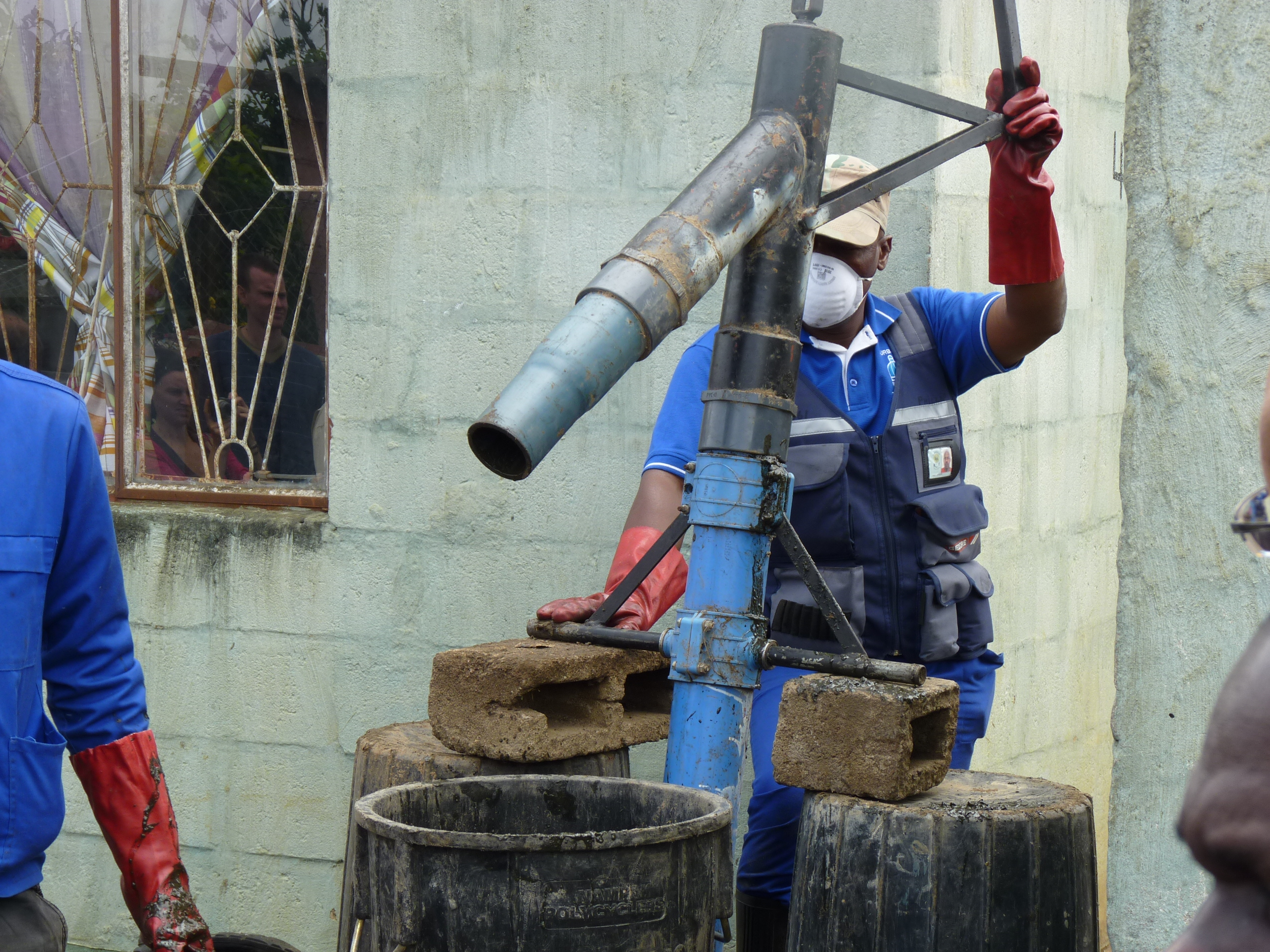
The "Gulper", a device for manual pumping of fecal sludge from pits used in Durban, South Africa

If the fecal sludge is liquid enough, it is usually collected by using vacuum pumps or centrifugal style booster pumps. A variety of manual and motorized devices designed to excavate thick and viscous sludge and accumulated trash are also available in the market.

After sitting for years in septic tanks and pit latrines, the accumulated sludge becomes hardened and is very difficult to remove. It is still common that workers enter pits in order to desludge them, even though this practice is generally unsafe and undesirable (in India, this practice is called "manual scavenging"). A number of low-cost pumping systems exist to remove this hardened sludge hygienically from the ground surface, although many of them are still in the experimental stage (e.g. Excravator, Gulper, e-Vac).

Fecal sludge can also be treated inside the tank or pit as well, by use of the "in-pit lime stabilization process", which treats the waste before it is removed from the tank or pit. Once removed, it is transported to onsite or off site treatment and processing facilities.

Some advanced transfer stations and vacuum trucks can dewater fecal sludge to some extent, and this water may be placed in sewer lines to be treated in wastewater treatment plants. This allows more sludge to be dealt with more efficiently and may constitute one of the best cases of co-treatment of fecal sludge in wastewater treatment plants.

=== Transfer stations ===
Transfer stations are intermediary drop off locations often used where treatment facilities are located too far away from population centers to make direct disposal feasible. In other locations, traffic concerns or local truck bans during daylight hours may make transfer stations feasible. In addition, municipalities where a significant percentage of homes cannot be accessed by tanker truck should utilize transfer stations. Transfer stations are used if:

- More than 5% of the homes are inaccessible by a vacuum truck;
- The treatment plant is too far away from the homes for transport in one haul to be practical;
- Trucks are not permitted on the streets during the day; or
- Heavy traffic during daylight hours impedes the movement of vacuum trucks.

==== Mobile transfer stations ====
Mobile transfer stations are nothing more than larger tanker trucks or trailers that are deployed along with small vacuum trucks and motorcycle or hand carts. The smaller vehicles discharge to the larger tanker, which then carries the collected sludge to the treatment plant. These work well in scheduled desludging business models.

==== Fixed transfer stations ====
Fixed transfer stations are dedicated facilities installed strategically throughout the municipality that serve as drop off locations for collected fecal sludge. They may include a receiving station with screens, a tank for holding the collected waste, trash storage containers, and wash down facilities. These may be more appropriate for FSM programs using the "call-for-service" business model.

While static transfer stations are fixed tanks, mobile transfer stations are simply tanker trucks or trailers that work alongside the SVVs and actually do the longer haul transferring of the waste from the community to the treatment plant. Mobile transfer stations work best for scheduled desludging programs where there are no traffic restrictions or truck bans, and a relatively large number of homes that are inaccessible to the larger vehicles.

== Treatment processes ==
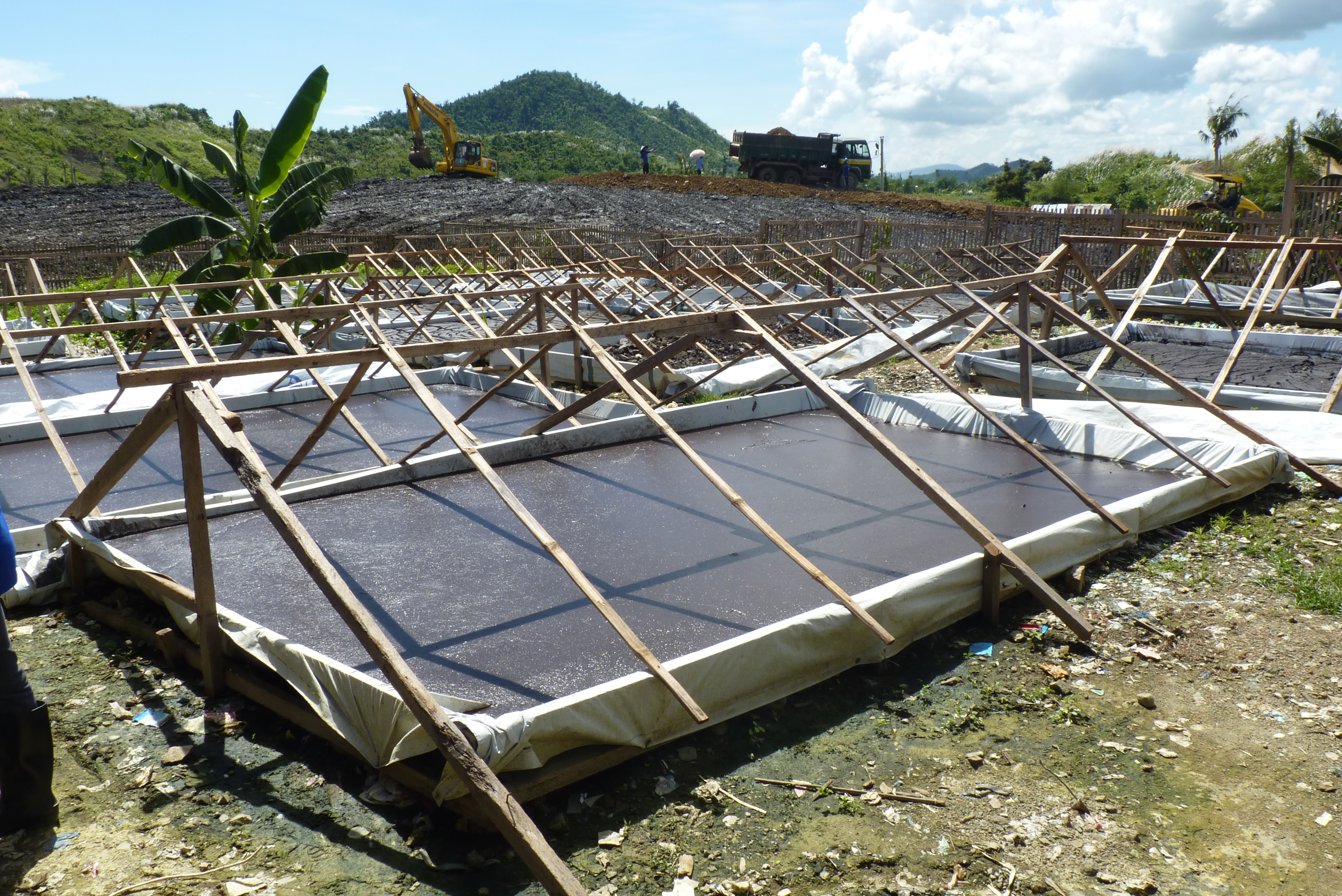
Drying bed for emergency fecal sludge treatment by Oxfam in the Philippines

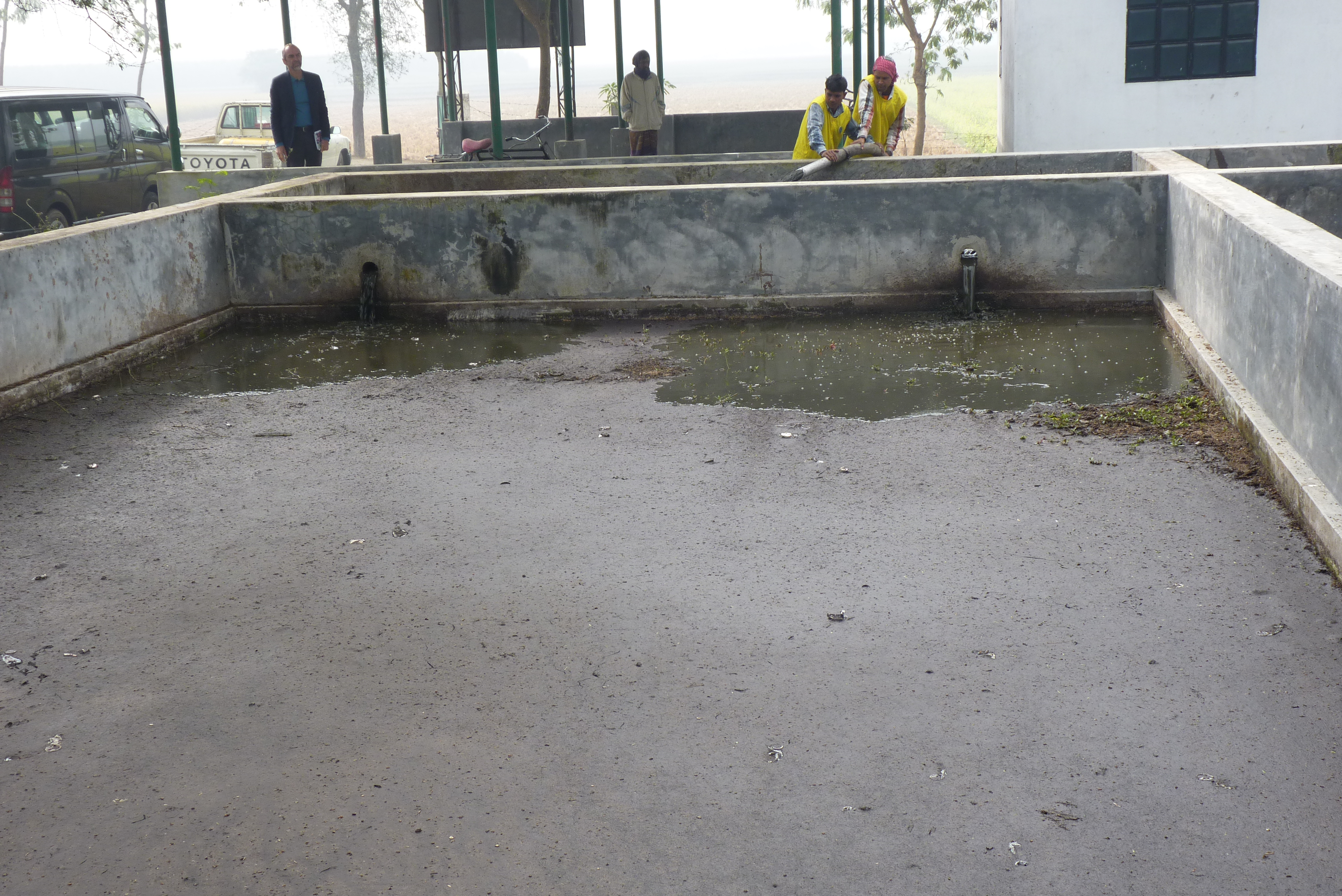
Drying bed for fecal sludge in Bangladesh

=== Characteristics of fecal sludge ===
Characteristics of fecal sludge may vary widely due to climate, toilet type, diet and other variables. Fecal sludge can be grouped by consistency as "liquid" (total solids or TS <5%), "slurry" (TS 5–15%), "semi-solid" (TS 15–25%), and "solid" (TS >25%). Quantities and qualities of fecal sludge and wastewater are very different, with the range of fecal sludge characteristics being 1–2 orders of magnitude higher than wastewater.

The result of the demographic, environmental, and technical factors that influence characteristics of fecal sludge is a high level of heterogeneity that complicates characterization.

In the absence of actual data, designers often use default values, such as 2,000 mg/L for BOD and 5,000 mg/L of TSS in order to size the treatment system. However, this often results in over-design or under-design of fecal sludge treatment plants. This is because there is often no "standard range of variation" for particular properties, and findings from one study cannot necessarily be used as a base of comparison to another.

Research has shown that correlations to spatially available data can help predict quantities and qualities of fecal sludge. The relevant indicators for the prediction include income level, users, volume, emptying frequency, and truck size. Using these correlations in characteristics could provide a way to reduce analytical costs for fecal sludge analysis.

Performing a waste characterization study helps to understand local conditions and provides data that factors into treatment plant sizing. It can also help to estimate the value of the products that can be derived from the treatment process.

The main physico-chemical parameters commonly measured to characterize fecal sludge include: BOD, total suspended solids, % solids, indication of sand, COD, ammonium, total nitrogen and total phosphorus, Fats, Oil and Grease (FOG), Sludge Volume Index (SVI), pH, alkalinity.

Relatively little data exists on pathogen content in fecal sludge. One study from rural Bangladesh determined 41 helminth eggs per g of fecal sludge from pit latrines.

The characteristics of fecal sludge may be influenced by:

- Methods, techniques and the skill levels of personnel conducting the desludging;
- The efficiency of the different types of equipment used in desludging;
- Seasonality – presence of groundwater or flood water that may infiltrate into tanks and dilute the contents;
- The last time the tank was desludged (age of fecal sludge).

=== Conventional treatment processes ===
Fecal Sludge is often processed through a series of treatment steps to first separate the liquids from the solids, and then treat both the liquid and solid trains while recovering as much of the energy or nutritive value as possible. Common processes at fecal sludge treatment plants include:

- Fecal sludge reception – where the truck interfaces with the treatment plant and sludge is unloaded.
- Preliminary treatment – to remove garbage, sand, grit, and FOG (fats, oil and grease)
- Primary treatment – simple separation of liquid and solids by physical means (dewatering and thickening), e.g. with drying beds
- Liquids treatment – for example by using constructed wetlands, waste stabilization ponds, anaerobic digesters
- Solids processing – using the solids resulting from fecal sludge treatment for beneficial use where possible.

Constructed wetlands are gaining attention as a low-cost treatment technology that can be constructed in many instances using local materials and labor. For sites with enough land and a ready supply of gravel and sand, this technology offers low cost, scalability, and simple operation.

==== Drying beds ====
Simple sludge drying beds can be used for dewatering and drying, as they are a cheap and simple method to dry fecal sludge (they are also widely used to dry sewage sludge). Drainage water must be captured; drying beds are sometimes covered but usually left uncovered. Drying beds are typically composed of four layers (from top to bottom): Sludge, sand, fine gravel, coarse gravel and drainage pipes.

Fecal sludges behave differently during dewatering processes than wastewater sludges. The amount of extracellular polymeric substances (EPS) can be an important predictor for fecal sludge dewatering performance. Fecal sludge from public toilets took longer to dewater than sludge from other sources, and had turbid supernatant after settling.

Grasses with adventitious roots may also be planted in drying beds, allowing for reduction of odor, collection over longer periods, production of forage, and more decomposition of the final biosolids by the time they are extracted. The roots introduce oxygen and maintain the permeability of the sludge. Earthworms may also play an important role in such beds.

=== Emerging technologies ===
Emerging technologies for fecal sludge treatment include:

- Technologies that can produce a dried or carbonized solid fuel from fecal sludge include: drying, pelletizing, hydrothermal carbonization, and slow pyrolysis.
- Thermal processes which can achieve cost effectiveness by eliminating the need for separate processes. They convert the fecal sludge along with certain fractions of sewage sludge or municipal solid waste to produce energy or fuel by using certain sewage sludge treatment technologies.
- Biodiesel can be manufactured by using fats, oils and grease as feedstocks. Research by RTI International is being conducted to use fecal sludge for biodiesel production.
- Electricity can be produced by thermal processes that burn fecal and solid waste together to maintain stable combustion and the heat is used to make steam that drives generators.

==== Solar thermal dryers ====
Solar thermal dryers rely on the collection of the solar thermal energy for drying and pasteurization of fecal sludge. In these systems, the sludge is placed inside an enclosure of transparent or opaque walls, with a ventilation system for moisture evacuation. The sludge can be dried by hot air that was heated by a solar thermal collector (indirect solar dryer), by direct exposure to solar radiation (direct solar dryer), or by both modes (mixed solar dryer).

=== On site treatment using mobile treatment units ===
The Water Sanitation and Hygiene Institute of India has developed a truck based mobile treatment unit (MTU) that is able to treat fecal sludge on site. The MTUs were evaluated in a technical paper authored by Aaron Forbis-Stokes. The system was evaluated for operational and treatment performance while processing septage in the field at 108 sites in Tamil Nadu, India. This option is preferable as it does not require transport of the septage and avoids the common practice of illegal disposal of untreated septage into the environment. Six mobile septage treatment units have been built to date using readily available filters and membranes (mesh fabric, sand, granular activated carbon (GAC), microfilter, ultrafilter) and installed on the bed of a small truck. The target application is emptying of septic or sewage holding tanks and concentration of suspended solids while generating a liquid that could be safely discharged. With support from a USAID grant, the WASH Institute is working to scale the MTU solution as the preferred option over traditional vacuum trucks that discharge wastes into the environment.

=== Co-treatment at wastewater treatment plants ===
Co-treatment of septage at wastewater treatment plants may be considered where the volume of septage removed from on-site facilities is small, as will be the case in situations where most households have access to sewerage. However, the high strength of septage and fecal sludge means that relatively small volumes of both can have a large impact on the organic, suspended solids, and nitrogen loads on a wastewater treatment plant. Possible consequences include an increase in the volume of screenings and grit requiring removal; increased odour emission at headworks; increased scum and sludge accumulation rates; and increased organic loading, leading to overloading and process failure, and the potential for increased odour and foaming in aeration tanks. Because of their partly digested nature, septage and fecal sludge will usually degrade at a slower rate than municipal wastewater. Therefore, their presence is likely to have an adverse impact on the efficacy of treatment processes. The intermittent nature of fecal sludge and septage loading can also amplify the problems identified above.

Despite these possible drawbacks, wastewater treatment facilities with spare capacity are a potential resource to be investigated. Even where co-treatment is not an option, existing wastewater treatment plants may provide land in strategic locations, close to areas of demand for septage management services. Separate preliminary treatment and solids-liquid separation facilities should always be provided for septage/fecal sludge. Solids-liquid separation will reduce both the overall load and the proportion of digested material in the liquid fraction and will thus lessen the possibility that it will disrupt wastewater treatment processes. Separated solids can be treated along with the sludge produced in sedimentation tanks during the wastewater treatment process.

=== Technology selection ===
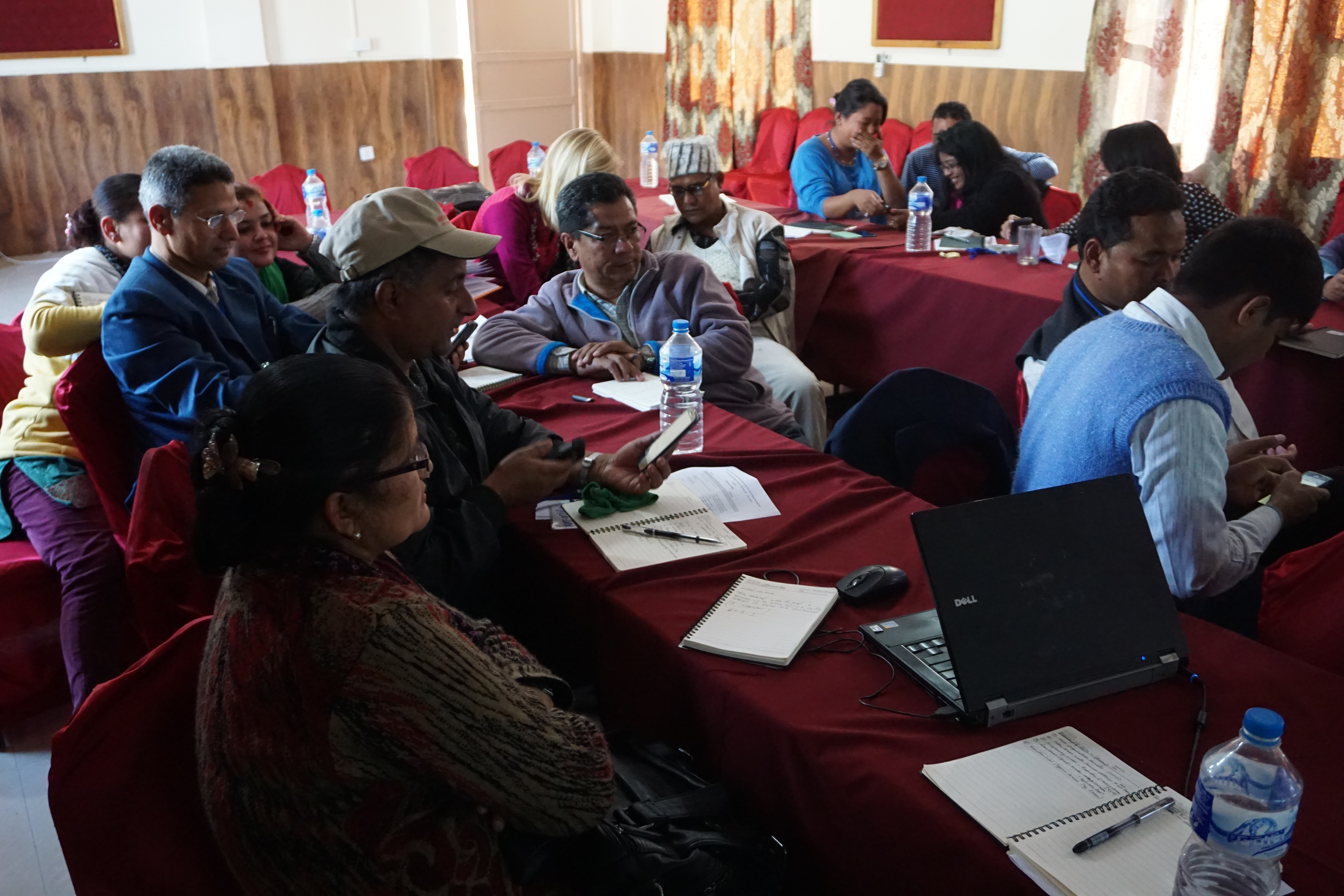
Training of enumerators for a survey regarding fecal sludge management needs in Nepal

A formal process should be used for making an informed technology selection for the treatment of the fecal sludge. It is usually a collaborative process conducted by stakeholders, consultants, the operator and the future owner of the facility. The process is based on a long term vision planning with stakeholders as part of citywide sanitation planning. The expected waste flows (volume), their strength, characteristics, and variability in each area need to be known. A formal and transparent process for developing appropriate plans and designs for wastewater and fecal sludge treatment plants will achieve local buy-in and ownership of technology decisions, which is critical for the long term success and sustainability of the program.

== Reuse options ==
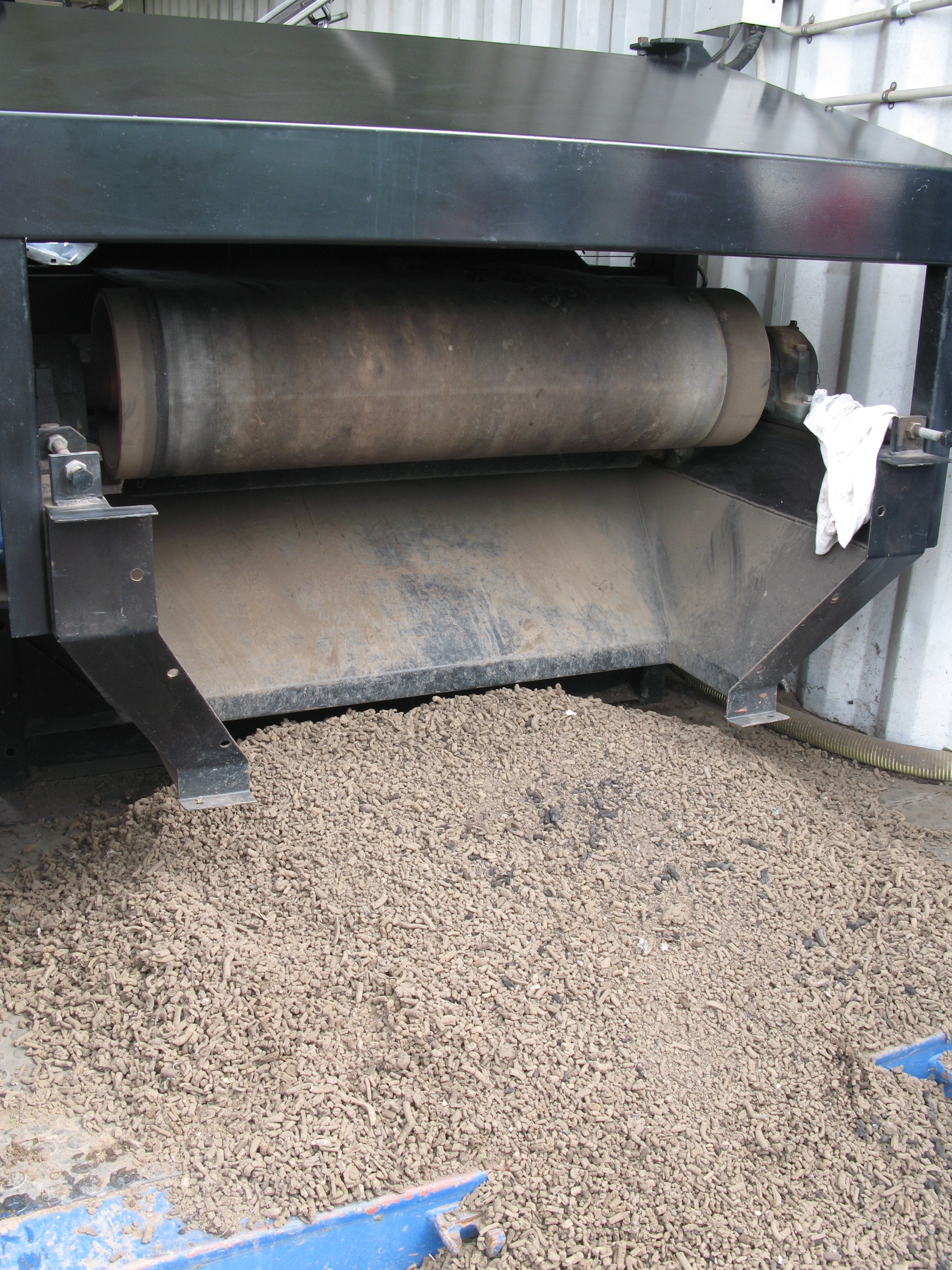
Sludge pellets after processing (including heating, drying and pelletizing) in a LaDePa process, eThekwini Municipality (South Africa)

Resource recovery from fecal sludge can take many forms, including as a fuel, soil amendment, building material, protein, animal fodder, and water for irrigation. Some of the by-products from fecal sludge treatment processes have the potential to offset some of the costs of collection and treatment, thereby reducing tariffs for the households. However, value addition all the way to biogas, biodiesel and electricity is difficult to achieve in practice due to technological and operational challenges.

=== Composting ===
Composting is a process whereby organic matter is digested in the presence of oxygen with the byproduct of heat. For fecal sludge, the heat deactivates the pathogens while the digestion process breaks down the organic matter into a humus-like material that acts as a soils amendment, and nutrients that are broken down into a form that is more easily taken up by plants. Properly treated fecal sludge can be reused in agriculture.

Fecal sludge is rich in nitrogen. When fecal sludge is mixed with materials that are rich in carbon, such as shredded crop wastes, the composting process can be maximized. Proper mixture to achieve a ratio of 20 to 1 to 30 to 1 of carbon to nitrogen is best.

=== Solid fuel ===
Resource recovery as a solid fuel has been found to have high market potential in Sub-Saharan Africa. The selection of the fuel type will depend on: (1) the intended use of the fuel (e.g. combustion technology, user/handling requirements, and amount required); and (2) the properties of the input fecal sludge (e.g. level of stabilization, sand content, and moisture content). Once suitable technology options are identified, they must subsequently be evaluated for best fit in the local context (e.g. local capacity for electricity, land, and technical (operation and maintenance) requirements).

=== Others ===
Biogas is a renewable energy that is a byproduct of the anaerobic digestion process.

Treated effluent can be used for agricultural or landscape irrigation.

== Costs and fees ==
FSM is considered an entry point for sanitation improvement programs that are led by local governments. Such programs may include tariffs or user fees, promotions campaigns to raise the willingness to pay for the service, and local ordinances that define the rules and regulations governing FSM. In the Philippines, tariffs around US$1 per family per month are generally enough to achieve full cost recovery within a period of 3 to 7 years. Promotional campaigns are used to raise the willingness to pay for services, and local procedures and ordinances provide additional incentives for compliance.

== Synergies with other sectors ==
FSM is but one aspect of citywide sanitation that also includes:

- Municipal solid waste management;
- Drainage and greywater management;
- Wastewater collection and treatment including effluent overflows from on-site systems where soils based dispersal systems are insufficient to assimilate the volume;
- Water safety; and
- Food safety.

There are important synergies between many of these services and FSM, and investigating co-management opportunities can yield benefits. MSW can often be co-managed with fecal waste, especially when thermal treatment technologies are used. Food waste from restaurants and markets can be co-composted with fecal waste to produce a high value soils amendment. Fats, Oil and Grease (FOG) from commercial grease traps can be added to biodigesters to increase methane production, or used in conjunction with fecal sludge as a feedstock for biodiesel production. Water supply is also closely linked with FSM as it is often the water utility that will manage programs and their customers that will pay for services through tariffs.

== Examples ==
=== Dumaguete, the Philippines ===
USAID has supported efforts to introduce scheduled desludging services in some countries in Southeast Asia. The first of these was in Dumaguete in the Philippines. The program was run jointly by the city government and the Dumaguete City Water District, with the former operating the treatment plant and the Water District conducting the desludging. The cost of the scheme was covered by adding a tariff of 2 pesos (about 5 US cents) to the water bill for each cubic meter of water consumed (about one US dollar per family per month). This approach was possible because around 95% of residents had a connection to the Water District reticulation system. Trucks were to move from neighborhood to neighborhood on a scheduled cycle, emptying pits on a regular 3–4 year cycle. This approach requires a database of all pits and septic tanks requiring desludging. However, Dumaguete has by 2018 reverted to an 'on-call' system, the cost of which is still covered by the surcharge on the water tariff. It seems that users prefer this small regular payment to having to make large payments when tanks require desludging.

== See also ==
- Sewage Sludge
- Biosolids - treated sewage sludge
- Ecological Sanitation
- Nightsoil - a historical term for a material similar to fecal sludge
- Sewage sludge treatment
- WASH - water supply, sanitation, hygiene
