= Shit flow diagram =

Diagram of excreta flow in a settlement

- Synonym: Excreta flow diagram, SFD
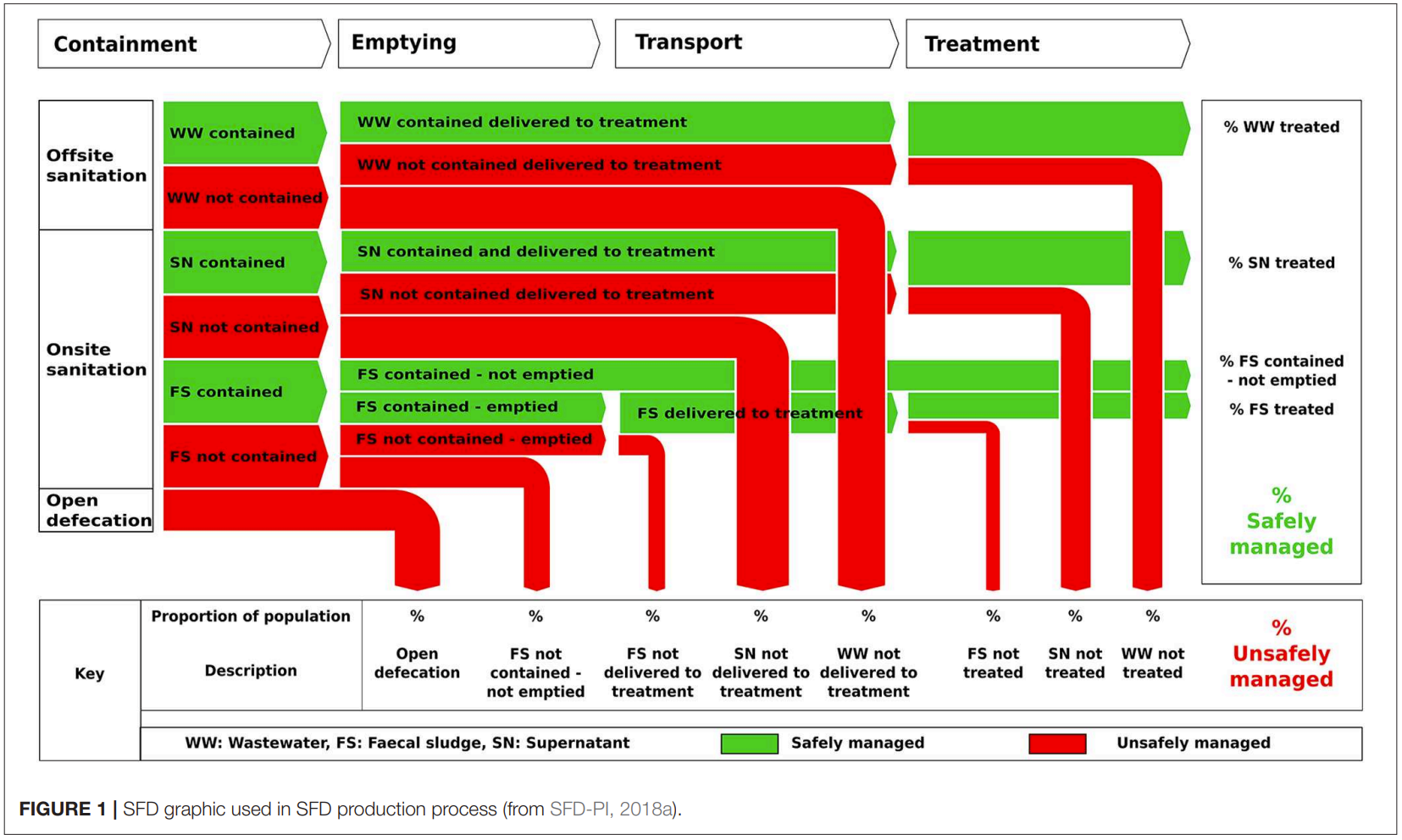
- An example shit flow diagram
- Position in sanitation chain: Planning
- Application level: City
- Environmental concerns: Water pollution, groundwater pollution, environmental health, public health, sewage sludge disposal issues

A shit flow diagram, also known as an SFD or excreta flow diagram, is a tool used to visually depict the management of human waste within urban sanitation systems. It distinguishes between safely and unsafely managed human excreta through color-coded arrows, providing insights into areas needing sanitation improvements. Initially developed through international collaboration, SFDs are commonly employed in urban sanitation planning and policy formulation, especially in low- and middle-income countries. Their creation involves data collection, stakeholder engagement, and systematic analysis. While SFDs offer valuable visual representations, their accuracy can be limited by data reliability issues and technical constraints, which ongoing methodological developments aim to address.

== Description ==
A shit flow diagram visually represents the flow of human excreta through various stages of the sanitation chain in urban areas, highlighting safe versus unsafe management practices. An SFD employs colored arrows to illustrate how excreta moves through containment, emptying, transport, treatment, and disposal or reuse stages. Green arrows indicate excreta flows that are safely managed—effectively contained, properly transported, adequately treated, and safely disposed of or reused—while red arrows represent unsafe management, such as inadequate containment, improper transport, lack of treatment, or unsafe environmental discharge, posing significant health and environmental risks. The width of each arrow in the diagram proportionally reflects the percentage of the population's excreta represented by that particular flow to communicate the relative scale of safe and unsafe sanitation practices.

The primary stages represented in an SFD include containment of excreta at the source (e.g., pit latrines, septic tanks, sewer systems), emptying and transporting excreta or fecal sludge, the subsequent treatment process to reduce harmful pathogens and pollutants, and finally, disposal or reuse, indicating whether excreta are safely managed or unsafely discharged into the environment. Through this visualization, authorities can readily identify specific points in the sanitation service chain that require intervention, facilitating targeted improvements and enabling effective monitoring towards achieving safely managed sanitation.

== Background ==
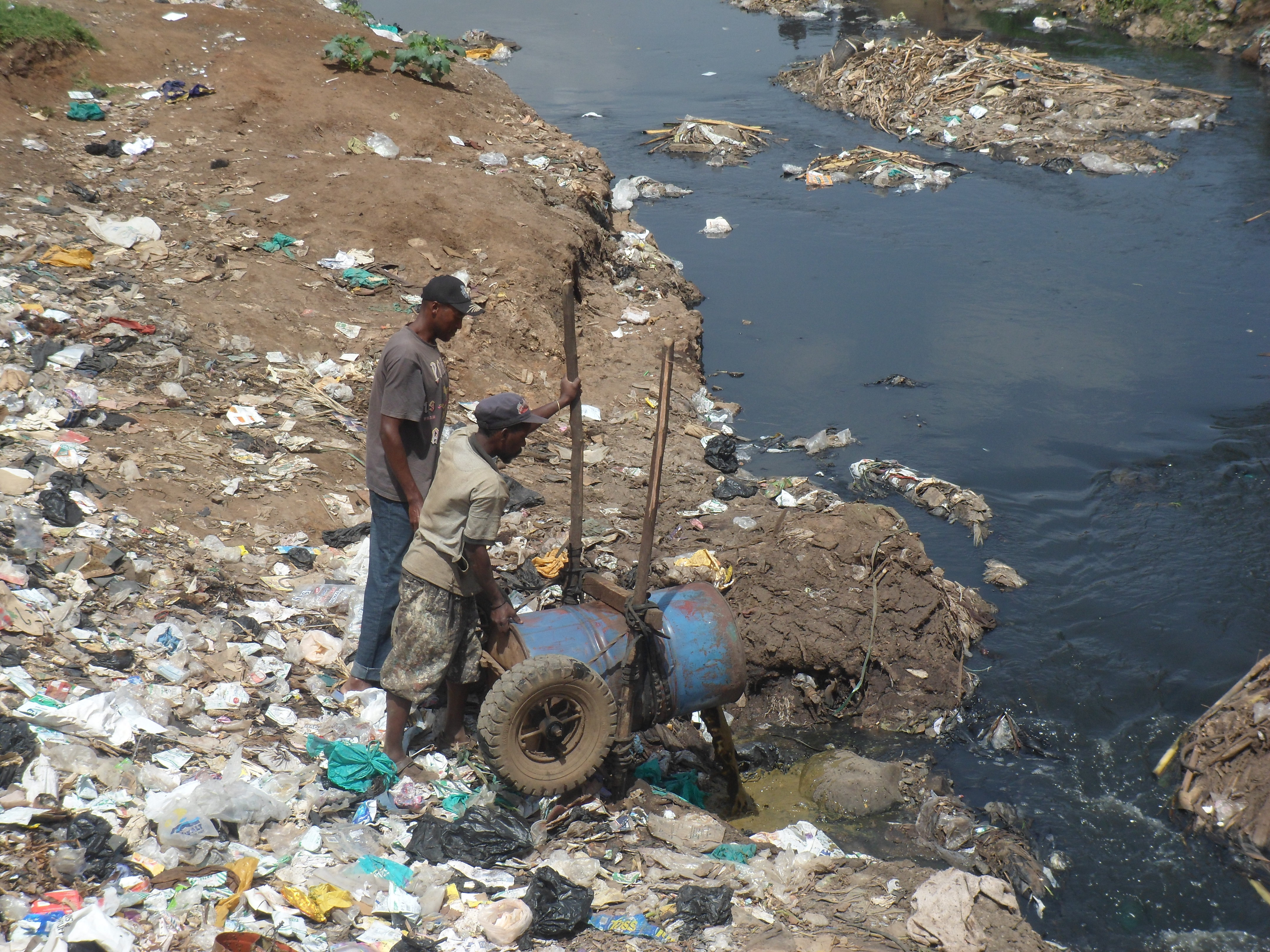
Dumping of fecal sludge into a river in Nairobi, Kenya

The shit flow diagram emerged as a practical tool for visualizing and communicating urban sanitation issues in low- and middle-income countries. Developed through the collaborative efforts of organizations such as the Sustainable Sanitation Alliance (SuSanA), Deutsche Gesellschaft für Internationale Zusammenarbeit (GIZ), the World Bank, the Swiss Federal Institute of Aquatic Science and Technology (EAWAG), and the Bill and Melinda Gates Foundation, the SFD has gained traction for its ability to clearly and concisely represent complex sanitation data, aiding decision-making and advocacy among diverse stakeholders.

Early prototypes of fecal waste flow diagrams were developed independently before the formalization of the SFD concept. Notable examples include those created for Kumasi, Ghana, in 1993 and Dakar, Senegal, in 2011, where the term "sanitation cityscape" was initially employed. The importance of analytical tools to comprehensively address sanitation issues, including underlying policy, regulatory, institutional, and financial challenges, was strongly emphasized during the second Fecal Sludge Management Conference (FSM2) held in Durban, South Africa, in 2012. Subsequently, the Water and Sanitation Program (WSP) of the World Bank conducted a comprehensive 12-city study in 2012-13. In 2014, the SFD Promotion Initiative was established with a grant from the Bill and Melinda Gates Foundation, leading to further refinement and standardization of the methodology. This initiative developed comprehensive manuals, tools, and procedural guidelines to ensure consistency and comparability in SFD production worldwide. It also introduced the concept of assessing the enabling environment, which encompasses policies, regulatory frameworks, and institutional capacities necessary for sustainable sanitation services.

== Methodology ==
Developing a shit flow diagram involves several steps, combining primary data collection, literature reviews, stakeholder consultations, and data analysis. Initially, an extensive literature review is conducted to gather existing secondary data from government reports, academic publications, and international sanitation assessments. This secondary data provides baseline information and highlights potential data gaps or inconsistencies that need further validation.

Primary data collection is undertaken through field observations and key informant interviews. Field observations typically involve examining the condition of sanitation infrastructure, the frequency and methods of emptying, transport logistics, and the operational status of treatment facilities. Key informant interviews, often conducted with local government officials, sanitation service providers, and community representatives, provide valuable insights into local practices, institutional arrangements, and operational challenges.

Data collected through these methods is then systematically analyzed to map the sanitation service chain accurately. This analysis includes assessing the proportion of excreta that is safely managed at each stage, identifying potential leakage points, and determining the percentage of excreta flows that are unsafely discharged into the environment. Specialized tools, such as the SFD Graphic Generator, are used to visually represent the analyzed data, ensuring clarity and consistency across different diagrams and locations.

Throughout this process, engaging with stakeholders, authorities, and participants is essential to validate findings, foster ownership of the results, and encourage actionable insights for local improvements. Regular consultations and workshops are often held to review preliminary results, refine data accuracy, and discuss potential interventions for identified issues.

== Examples ==
=== Babati, Tanzania ===
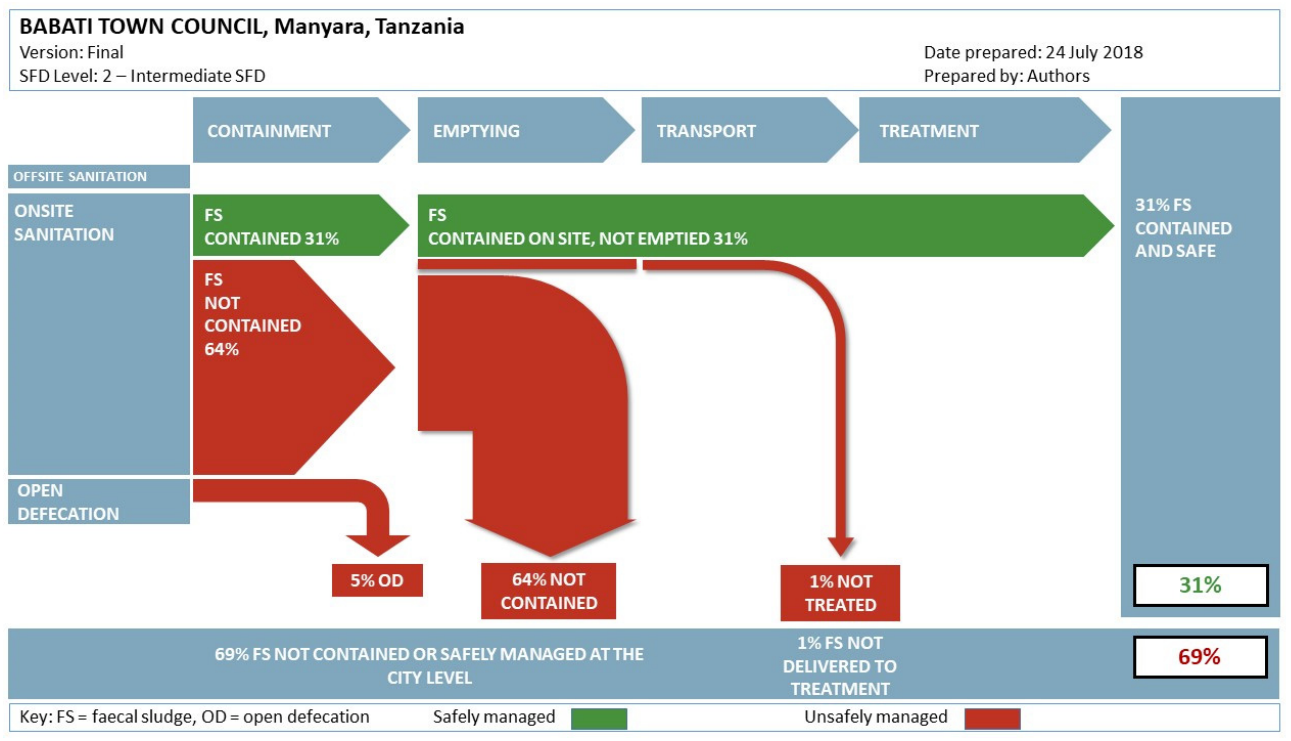
A shit flow diagram demonstrating the flow of fecal sludge in Babati, Tanzania

Babati experiences rapid urban growth but faces significant sanitation management challenges. Approximately 82% of housing units have sanitation facilities, yet only 31% of the fecal waste generated is safely managed onsite. The remaining 69% is unsafely discharged into the environment or improperly contained, posing significant risks to groundwater quality. The town lacks centralized sewerage and fecal sludge treatment facilities, forcing reliance on onsite sanitation systems.

Data collection and analysis using the shit flow diagram methodology revealed gaps between reported sanitation access and actual conditions. This analysis prompted local authorities to recognize the importance of implementing effective fecal sludge management, rather than attempting to introduce a central sewer system prematurely.

=== Kampala, Uganda ===
An SFD revealed that Greater Kampala relies heavily on onsite sanitation systems, with approximately 99% of its population using septic tanks, ventilated improved pit latrines, or traditional pit latrines. A significant challenge is the low rate of fecal sludge emptying: a study found that 53% of septic tanks have never been emptied, despite high accessibility to emptying services. Additionally, only about 35% of fecal sludge produced is collected and delivered to the Lubigi fecal sludge treatment plant. The treatment plant, operating at its maximum capacity, uses manual screening, grit removal, and drying beds. The city's existing sewage infrastructure primarily serves commercial and institutional users rather than residential ones.

Addressing these issues requires substantial infrastructure investments to improve the fecal sludge management system, expand treatment capacity, and enhance emptying services.

=== Alappuzha, India ===
Alappuzha, also called Alleppey, located in Kerala, India, faces significant sanitation challenges due to its flat topography, proximity to the Arabian Sea and Vembanad Lake, and a high groundwater table. Despite universal access to toilets, the municipality lacks facilities for treating sewage or fecal sludge, causing severe environmental contamination. Most onsite sanitation systems, including septic tanks and pit latrines, are inadequately designed and irregularly emptied, leading to untreated waste contaminating local groundwater and canals. Tests indicated widespread contamination, with E. coli detected in the majority of water samples. Additionally, the town's canals suffer from eutrophication due to nutrient-rich seepage from improperly managed sanitation systems, negatively affecting tourism, one of Alappuzha's key economic activities.

The SFD for Alappuzha clearly highlights these issues, emphasizing the urgent need for improved fecal sludge management and infrastructure investments to safeguard environmental and public health.

=== Guwahati, India ===
In Guwahati, sanitation sustainability is complicated by frequent seasonal flooding and poor sanitation infrastructure design. Despite a high reported coverage of improved sanitation facilities (93.4%), actual management practices differ significantly, leading to regular shifts between improved and unimproved sanitation statuses depending on seasonal flooding. Many latrines become flooded or inaccessible during monsoons, forcing residents to resort to "sanitation stacking," where multiple sanitation methods, including open defecation, are used simultaneously depending on seasonal and environmental conditions. Additionally, many septic tanks discharge effluent directly into marshlands, severely compromising environmental safety.

Shit flow diagrams for the area reveal that, although officially considered "improved," nearly half of the sanitation systems (approximately 46%) safely manage fecal sludge, highlighting significant discrepancies between official classifications and actual on-the-ground sanitation practices.

== Further development ==
Shit flow diagrams face several challenges and limitations. Reliable data collection is often hampered by limited local technical capacity, unclear definitions of sanitation containment systems, and insufficient performance data, particularly regarding onsite sanitation. Informal sanitation practices, inadequate record-keeping, and discrepancies between reported and actual conditions can significantly impact the accuracy and reliability of SFDs. Additionally, widespread improper disposal practices and insufficient reliable data on treatment outcomes make it challenging to accurately evaluate sanitation safety.

Proposed improvements for SFDs include refining methodologies to better differentiate between types of sanitation systems and management practices, developing clearer guidelines for data collection and interpretation, and enhancing local capacity through targeted training programs. Furthermore, expanding the use of digital and mobile tools to streamline data collection and analysis is anticipated to improve the accuracy and efficiency of SFD generation. Integrating environmental considerations alongside public health criteria will also enhance the utility of SFDs for comprehensive urban sanitation planning.
