= Saprotrophic bacteria =

Bacteria

Saprotrophic bacteria are bacteria that are typically soil-dwelling and utilize saprotrophic nutrition as their primary energy source. They are often associated with soil fungi that also use saprotrophic nutrition and both are classified as saprotrophs.

A saprotroph is a type of decomposer that feeds exclusively on dead and decaying plant matter. Saprotrophic organisms include fungi, bacteria, and water molds which are critical to decomposition and nutrient cycling, providing nutrition for consumers at higher trophic levels. They obtain nutrients via absorptive nutrition, in which nutrients are externally digested by a variety of enzymes and subsequently absorbed by the saprotroph.

Community composition and proliferation rates of saprotrophic indicator bacteria are often considered signals of community health in soil, aquatic, and bodily systems.

== Structure and life cycle ==
All saprotrophic bacteria are unicellular prokaryotes, and reproduce asexually through binary fission. Variation in the turnover times (the rate at which a nutrient is depleted and replaced in a particular nutrient pool) of the bacteria may be due in part to variation in environmental factors including temperature, soil moisture, soil pH, substrate type and concentration, plant genotype, and toxins. These factors can, in turn, alter the rates of decomposition and soil organic matter turnover, impacting ecosystem productivity.

When colonizing a new environment, the population of a saprotrophic strain of bacteria initially decreases and then reaches a point of population stabilization. While they are common in soil environments, they can persist anywhere with available food resources, such as in aquatic environments, or in fecal matter. As such, they are a common organism in waste products, where they break down various compounds to obtain nourishment.

== Growth rate ==
Saprotrophic bacterial growth rate is very sensitive to changes in environmental conditions, making it a good variable to detect rapid and subtle changes in microbial communities. Growth rates are also used to measure interactions between bacteria and fungi, with research suggesting bacterial inhibition of fungal growth as it may exert a competitive pressure on fungi. Under normal soil conditions, bacterial biomass production remains relatively steady, as the growth of microorganisms is balanced by predation and other types of cell death. Studies on bacterial growth rates using leucine or thymidine incorporation suggest the turnover times of soil bacterial communities to be in the order of days to weeks at a temperature of around 20 °C. Other studies have estimated a longer turnover time varying between 107–160 days at 25 °C. This large discrepancy could be due to differences in the methods used for these estimations, as well as differences in the incubation temperatures, which are of utmost importance in determining growth rates. Studies have shown that optimal bacterial growth is achieved at temperatures around 25-30 °C in temperate soils, which is usually much higher than the mean annual temperature.

Bacterial growth in the rhizosphere presents a special situation, as it supports the rapid proliferation of bacteria compared with the surrounding soil due to the input of root exudates into the soil. Here, bacterial turnover times are estimated to be in the range of just 12–19 hours, with shorter times exhibited on younger roots.

Overall, there has not been sufficient research on bacterial growth rates in soil. This contrasts with our comparatively vast knowledge of bacterial growth rate measurements in aquatic environments. We may blame this disparity on the complexity of the soil matrix, which includes both bacterial and fungal decomposers with different feeding strategies.

== Environmental factors ==
Several environmental factors may impact the activity of saprotrophs, including soil moisture, pH, and the presence of substrates. Soil moisture, indicated by carbon mineralization, is positively correlated with bacterial growth, with bacterial growth increasing as soil moisture content increases.

In terms of soil pH, there is a well-known pattern of bacterial dominance in neutral or slightly alkaline soils, though clear evidence for the differential growth of bacteria in soils with different pH is scarce.

Compared to fungi, bacteria are considered more competitive in degrading easily available substrates. In addition to quality and type, the concentration of substrate is also important to bacterial growth in soil. For example, a study utilizing the addition of different concentrations of glucose found that bacterial growth increased significantly at low concentrations, and was inhibited at very high concentrations. On the other hand, increased substrate flow in the rhizosphere due to root exudation has been shown to significantly increase bacterial growth rates. Here, there is a plant species and genotype effect on growth, presumably due to different exudation rates.

== Parasitism ==
Some saprotrophic bacteria are common pathogens in medicine and agriculture, as they move readily between individuals via consumption or other modes of exposure, such as contact with excrement. For example, certain bacteria may be vectors for food borne illnesses such as Escherichia coli. Others have the ability to decompose cellulose, and are often found in the rumen of cows, aiding in their digestion by fermenting the cellulose in grass.

== Nutrient cycling and MEEs ==
Through saprotrophic nutrition, saprotrophic bacteria release microbial extracellular enzymes (MEEs) into the environment to break down soil organic matter (SOM). MEEs are released when an organism's energy and nutrient needs are not being met. This allows for the monitoring of MEEs as an indicator of nutrient availability in soil. Some significant MEEs are:

- Phenol oxidases (PHO): PHOs can biodegrade or detoxify aromatic pollutants into sources of carbon. Additionally, PHO's act as an indirect hydrolases in peat bogs, which accelerate the decomposition of soil organic matter. PHO's break down phenolics, which inhibit hydrolases. Thus, when microorganisms are limited, decomposition is also limited. This process has been termed an "enzymatic latch."
- β-glucosidase (GLU): GLUs are involved in securing energy sources and labile carbon for microorganisms. This is accomplished through the catalysis of the release of monosaccharides and the hydrolysis of oligosaccharides.
- Acid (alkaline) phosphatase (AP): APs can be used as indicators for P mineralization potential and availability in soil.

== Role in forest ecosystems ==
In forest soils, bacteria are important in the decomposition of fungal mycelia and in nitrogen cycle processes, including nitrogen fixation. Additionally, bacteria, alongside fungi, mediate the bulk of biogeochemical processes, determine the availability of mineral nutrients, and determine the fate of carbon in these soils. However, bacteria’s higher demand for nitrogen and inability to translocate nutrients makes them less efficient decomposers than fungi.

Ecosystem disturbances such as fires, insect invasions, and timber harvesting can lead to a slight decrease in bacterial abundance. Furthermore, the bacterial community composition may change in response to changes in nutrient availability and overall chemistry.
