= Sludge volume index =

Sludge Volume Index (SVI) is a process control parameter used to describe the settling characteristics of sludge in the aeration tank of an activated sludge process. It was introduced by Mohlman in 1934 and has become one of the standard measures of the physical characteristics of activated sludge processes. The SVI is often used to assess if process performance issues are related to the proliferation of problematic filamentous organisms that cause poor settling in secondary clarification processes.

It is defined as 'the volume (in mL) occupied by 1 gram of activated sludge after settling the aerated liquid for 30 minutes' and can be calculated as follows:

SVI (mL/g) = settled sludge volume (mL/L)/mixed liquor suspended solids(MLSS)(mg/L) * 1000 (mg/g)

The sludge is often too thick and has to be diluted with clarified secondary effluent before analyzing the SVI. In the diluted SVI (DSVI) test, the sludge sample is serially diluted until the 30-minute sludge volume is less than 200 mL. Clarified (or filtered) secondary effluent is used to prevent osmotic stress on the biomass that may affect the outcome. The modified equation for determining the DSVI is:

DSVI (mL/g) = diluted settled sludge volume (mL/L)/MLSS (mg/L) * 1000 [mg/g] * (total volume [mL]/original sludge sample volume [mL])
