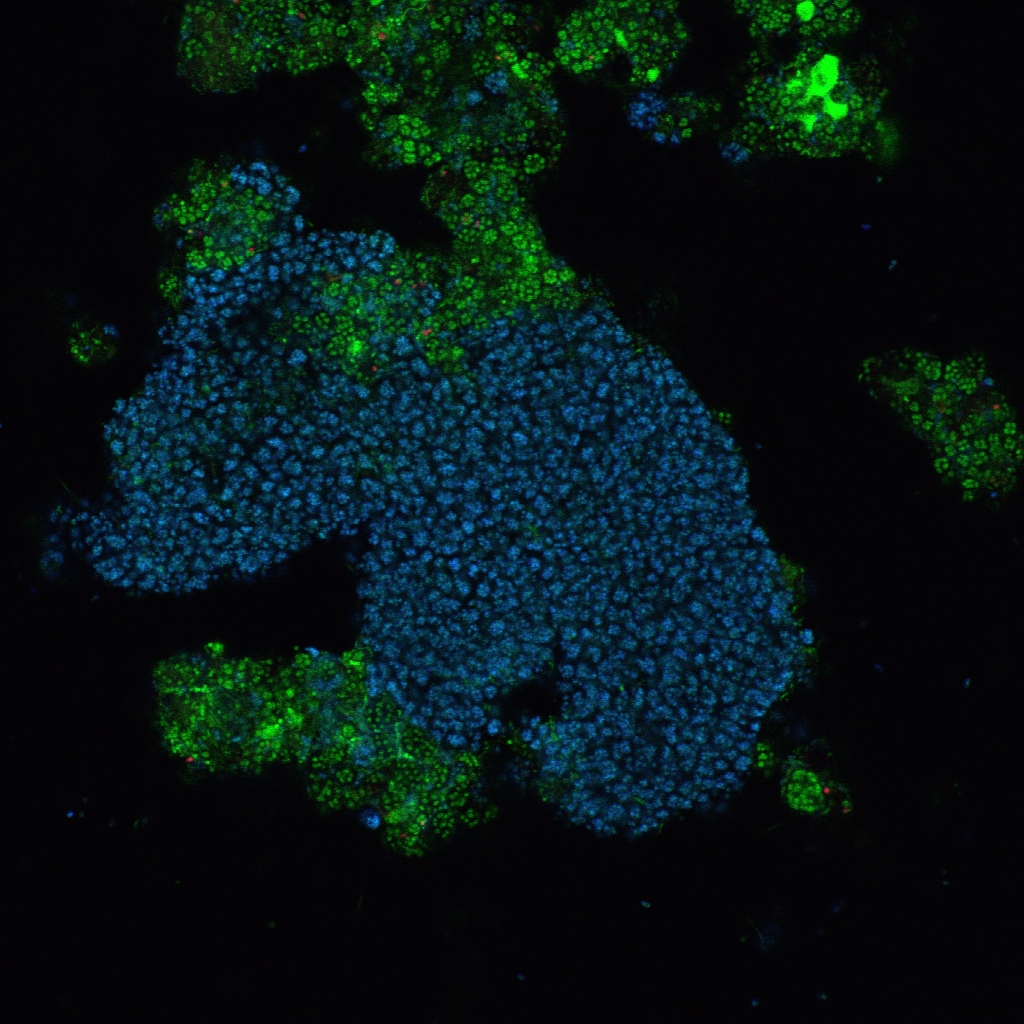
- Candidatus Accumulibacter phosphatis (blue cells)

Scientific classification (Candidatus)
- Domain: Bacteria
- Phylum: Pseudomonadota
- Class: Betaproteobacteria
- Order: incertae sedis
- Family: incertae sedis
- Genus: "Candidatus Accumulibacter"

= Accumulibacter phosphatis =

Candidatus Accumulibacter phosphatis

Species of bacterium

Candidatus Accumulibacter phosphatis (CAP) is an unclassified type of Betaproteobacteria that is a common bacterial community member of sewage treatment and wastewater treatment plants performing enhanced biological phosphorus removal (EBPR) and is a polyphosphate-accumulating organism. The role of CAP in EBPR was elucidated using culture-independent approaches such as 16S rRNA clone banks that showed the Betaproteobacteria dominated lab-scale EBPR reactors. Further work using clone banks and fluorescence in situ hybridization identified a group of bacteria, closely related to Rhodocyclus as the dominant member of lab-scale communities.

== Phylogeny ==
Currently, no cultured isolates of CAP exist, so the phylogeny of CAP strains is based purely of molecular biology techniques. To date, the polyphosphate kinase (ppk1) and the PHA synthase (phaC) genes have been used to characterise CAP populations at a higher resolution that 16S rRNA. The ppk1 phylogeny is more frequently used and groups CAP into two major divisions: type I and type II. Each of these types has a number of clades that are given a letter designation, e.g. IA, IIA, IIB, IIC. An environmental survey of wastewater treatment plants and natural waterways in California and Wisconsin in the USA revealed at least five CAP I (IA .. IE) clades and seven CAP II (IIA .. IIG) clades.

== Metabolism ==
CAP has yet to be cultured, but the ability to enrich lab-scale EBPR communities with up to 80% CAP has enabled research into its metabolism using meta-omic approaches. EBPR is generally associated with three stages: anaerobic, aerobic, and settling. For CAP to dominate in EBPR reactors, they must be able to thrive under these conditions. During the anaerobic phase, CAP can take up volatile fatty acids and store these simple carbon sources intracellularly as polyhydroxyalkanoates (PHAs). At the same time, intracellular polyphosphate is degraded to form ATP, releasing phosphate into the medium. During the subsequent aerobic phase, PHAs are used for energy production and phosphate is taken up from the medium to form polyphosphate. Genomic reconstruction from an EBPR reactor enriched with CAP IIA revealed it to contain two different types of phosphate transporters, the high-affinity Pst and low-affinity Pit transporters, as well as using the Embden-Meyerhof (EM) glycogen degradation pathway. Furthermore, the CAP IIA genome contains nitrogen and CO_{2} fixation genes, which indicate CAP has adapted to environments limited in carbon and nitrogen. A discrepancy between the genomic data and reactor performance data was the lack of a functional respiratory nitrate reductase gene. Previous work had shown CAP could use nitrate as the terminal electron acceptor, but the genomic data indicate the periplasmic nitrate reductase gene could not function in the electron transport chain, as it lacked the necessary quinol reductase subunit. To resolve these issues, lab-scale EBPR reactors enriched with CAP IA and CAP IIA were tested for their nitrate-reduction capabilities. CAP IA was able to couple nitrate reduction to phosphate uptake, while the genomically characterised CAP IIA could not.
