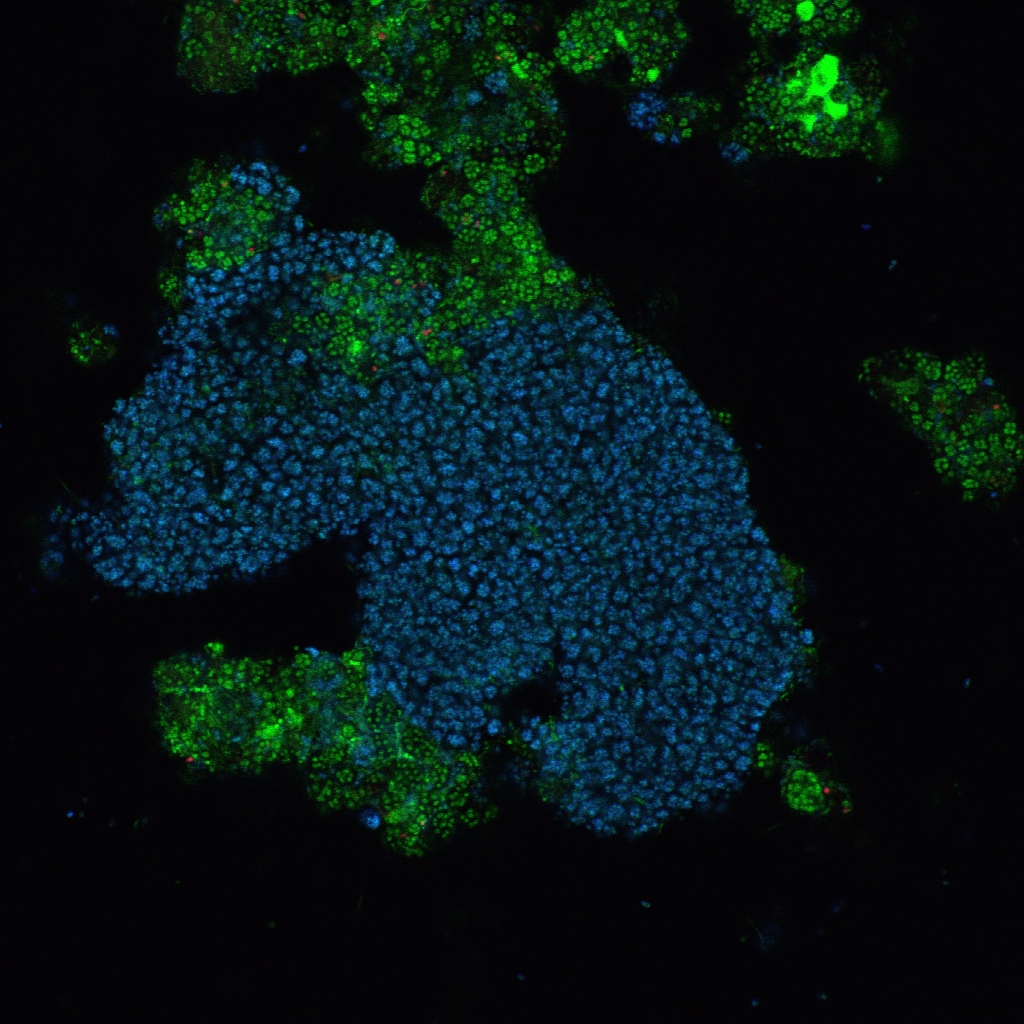
- "Candidatus Accumulibacter phosphatis" (blue cells)

Scientific classification (Candidatus)
- Domain: Bacteria
- Kingdom: Pseudomonadati
- Phylum: Pseudomonadota
- Class: Betaproteobacteria
- Order: Rhodocyclales
- Family: Rhodocyclaceae
- Genus: "Candidatus Accumulibacter"

Members
- "Candidatus Accumulibacter phosphatis"

= Accumulibacter =

Candidatus Accumulibacter

Group of bacteria

"Candidatus Accumulibacter" is an unclassified group of Betaproteobacteria that currently contains only a single member, "Candidatus Accumulibacter phosphatis". "Ca. A. phosphatis" is a common bacterial community member of wastewater treatment plants performing enhanced biological phosphorus removal and is a polyphosphate-accumulating organism. There are currently no cultured representatives, however due to the importance of "Ca. A. phosphatis" in the biotechnology industry there has been much research into the physiology of these bacteria.
