= Activated sludge model =

Group of mathematical methods coordinated by the International Water Association (IWA)

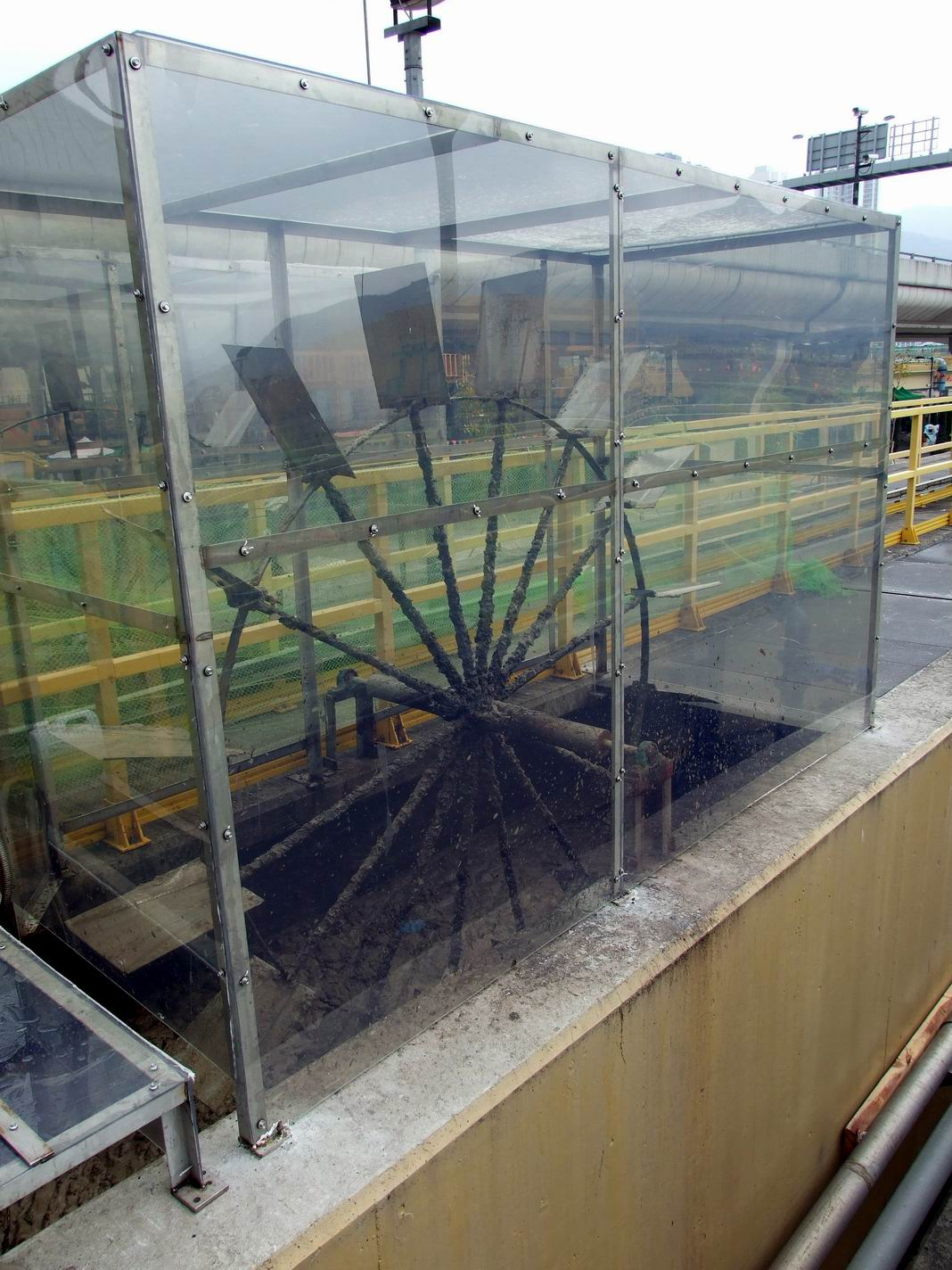
Activated sludge at the bottom of the sedimentation tank

Activated sludge model is a generic name for a group of mathematical methods to model activated sludge systems. The research in this area is coordinated by a task group of the International Water Association (IWA). Activated sludge models are used in scientific research to study biological processes in hypothetical systems. They can also be applied on full scale wastewater treatment plants for optimisation, when carefully calibrated with reference data for sludge production and nutrients in the effluent.

Around 1983 a task group of the International Association on Water Quality (one of the associations that formed IWA) was formed. They started creating on a generalised framework for mathematical models that could be used to model activated sludge for nitrogen removal. One of the main goals was to develop a model of which the complexity was as low as possible and simple to represent, though still able to accurately predict the biological processes. After four years, the first IAWQ model, named ASM1 was ready and incorporated a basic model taking into account chemical oxygen demand (COD), bacterial growth, and biomass degradation.

An activated sludge model consists of:

- state variables: these include the different fractions of COD, biomass and different types of nutrients, both organic and inorganic
- a description of the dynamic processes: lists the different biological processes that are modelled, together with their formulae
- parameters: variables that describe the circumstances of the biological system, such as growth and decay rate, half-saturation coefficient for hydrolysis, etc.

== History ==
Before work on ASM1 started in 1983, there were already some 15 years of experience in activated sludge modelling, although every research group that worked on mathematical systems of activated sludge created its own model framework, incompatible to all others. ASM1 therefore catalysed the research and had a major impact on activated sludge modelling.

ASM1 was the foundation for numerous extensions. These extensions include for example better prediction of nitrogen and phosphorus removal. Widely used extended models include ASM2, ASM2d, and ASM3P. At the time of publication of the ASM1 model, biological phosphorus removal was already used although this process was not completely understood at that time. Basic knowledge of phosphorus removing bacteria was included in the ASM1 model and parameters were adjusted accordingly. Hence after 8 years, ASM2 was published in 1995.

ASM1 does not include the role of phosphorus accumulating organisms nor the relationship between biological phosphorus removal and removal of nitrogen. An enhanced version of ASM1, simply named ASM2, was developed to include biological and chemical phosphorus removal. As scientific understanding grew in the late 1990s, ASM2 was extended into ASM2d, principally by the addition of anoxic as well as aerobic uptake of phosphorus.

== Availability ==
The IWA activated sludge models are commonly used in existing programs. The most common are Biowin, GPS-X, WEST, STOAT, SIMBA#, SUMO, and ASIM. In addition there are Matlab implementations, Fortran code in the COST 682 Benchmarking report, and Modelica code in the Modelica WasteWater library.

== See also ==
- Activated sludge
- Bacterial growth
- Membrane bioreactors
- Michaelis-Menten kinetics
- Monod equation
