= Polyphosphate-accumulating organisms =

Type of organism

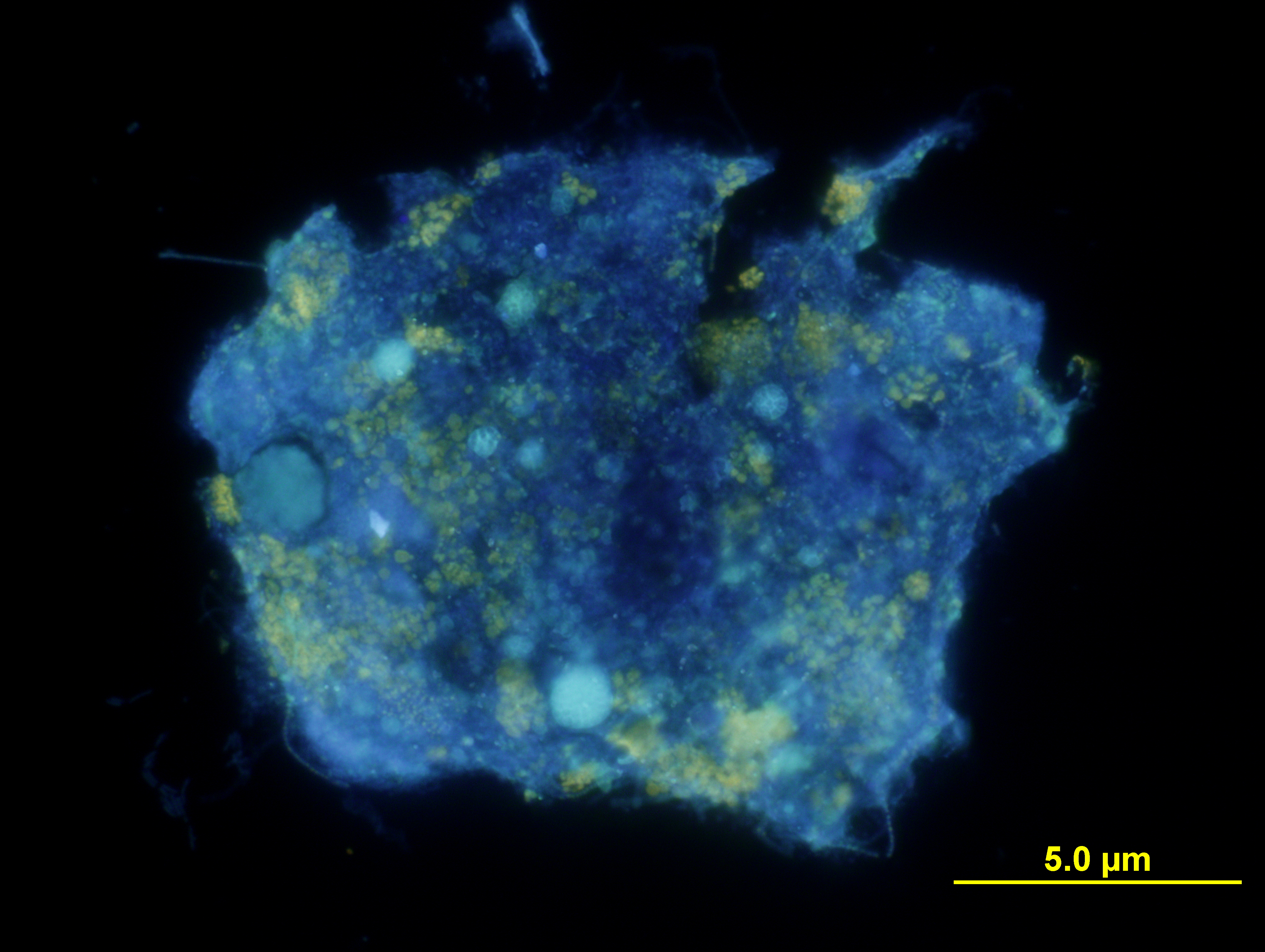
Cluster of PAOs

Polyphosphate-accumulating organisms (PAOs) are a group of microorganisms that, under certain conditions, facilitate the removal of large amounts of phosphorus from their environments. The most studied example of this phenomenon is in polyphosphate-accumulating bacteria (PAB) found in a type of wastewater processing known as enhanced biological phosphorus removal (EBPR); however, phosphate hyperaccumulation has been found to occur in other conditions such as soil and marine environments, as well as in non-bacterial organisms such as fungi and algae. PAOs accomplish this removal of phosphate by accumulating it within their cells as polyphosphate. PAOs are by no means the only microbes that can accumulate phosphate within their cells and, in fact, the production of polyphosphate is a widespread ability among microbes. However, PAOs have many characteristics that other organisms that accumulate polyphosphate do not have that make them amenable to use in wastewater treatment. Specifically, in the case of classical PAOs, is the ability to consume simple carbon compounds (energy source) without the presence of an external electron acceptor (such as nitrate or oxygen) by generating energy from internally stored polyphosphate and glycogen. Many bacteria cannot consume carbon without an energetically favorable electron acceptor; therefore, PAOs gain a selective advantage within the mixed microbial community present in the activated sludge. Therefore, wastewater treatment plants that operate for enhanced biological phosphorus removal have an anaerobic tank (where there is no nitrate or oxygen present as external electron acceptor) prior to the other tanks to give PAOs preferential access to the simple carbon compounds in the wastewater that is influent to the plant.

== Metabolisms ==
=== Classical (Canonical) PAO Metabolism ===
The classical or "canonical" behavior of PAOs is considered to be the release of phosphate (as orthophosphate) to the environment and transformation of intracellular polyphosphate reserves into polyhydroxyalkanoates (PHA) from volatile fatty acids (VFAs) and glycogen during anoxic conditions. This is followed by the consumption of the PHA/VFAs and uptake of environmental orthophosphate during oxic conditions to regenerate polyphosphate reserves within the cell.

=== Non-Canonical (or "Fermentative) PAO Metabolism ===
Some PAOs have been found to have alternative methods to accumulating polyphosphate, particularly to do with not storing PHA or glycogen. This is generally believed to be seen more often in extracellular environments high in organic compounds, thus containing fermentable substrates like amino acids and sugars. However, the exact mechanisms of these microbes to accumulate and use polyphosphate are not well understood.

== Known Bacterial PAOs ==
=== Candidatus Phosphoribacter (previously referred to as Tetrasphaera prior to 2022) ===
Candidatus Phosphoribacter is a bacterial genus that has been found to be the dominant PAO associated with wastewater treatment worldwide, and has been found to often participate more in the biological removal of phosphorus than Candidatus Accumulibacter, contrary to previous understandings. This bacteria has been found to be a non-canonical (or fermentative/"fPAO") PAO, and universally lack the genetic potential to store PHA. This genus was largely found to be capable of producing the fermentation products acetate, lactate, alanine, and succinate. Additionally, it is suggested that the amino acids lysine, arginine, histidine, leucine, isoleucine, valine and phenylalanine may replace the canonical purpose of PHA as an energy substrate during oxic conditions, based on genomic potential and similarity to behavior of other microbial metabolisms. Alternatively, the compound cyanophycin may used as an energy substrate due to the ubiquity of cyanophycin-metabolizing enzymes encoded in the species.

=== Candidatus Accumulibacter phosphatis ===
Candidatus Accumulibacter phosphatis is one of the most well-studied PAOs, and is responsible for the development of the classical PAO metabolic model which Ca. Phosphoribacter later contradicted. Formerly considered the most important PAO in waste treatment, the bacteria is highly abundant in wastewater treatment plants globally. It can consume a range of carbon compounds, such as acetate and propionate, under anaerobic conditions and store these compounds as polyhydroxyalkanoates (PHA) which it consumes as a carbon and energy source for growth using oxygen or nitrate as electron acceptor. Historically, the hyperaccumulation of phosphate by Ca. Accumulibacter was seen as a stress response, but currently it is suggested that this behavior may play an ecological role. In combination with Ca. Phosphoribacter, these two PAOs are considered to account for 24-70% of phosphorus removed from wastewater during treatment processing.

=== Candidatus dechloromonas ===
Candidatus Dechloromonas species phosphoritropha and phosphorivorans are PAOs with classical metabolism genotype. Dechloromonas has been found in high abundances in wastewater treatment plants across the world. The two species described here, Dechloromonas phosphoritropha and phosphorivans, are the two most abundant species in waste treatment within the genus.

=== Candidatus accumulimonas (previously referred to as Candidatus Halomonas phosphatis) ===
Candidatus accumulimonas is a species of PAO with classical metabolism phenotype.

=== Microlunatis phosphovorus ===
Microlunatis phosphovorus is a species of PAO with likely non-canonical PAO metabolism, however exact mechanisms have not been determined. Belonging to the same phylum as Ca. phosphoribacter, these two actinobacterial organisms exhibit similar metabolisms, however M. phosphovorus has been suggested to hyperaccumulate over ten times the amount of polyphosphate per cell mass dry weight compared to Ca. phosphoribacter or proteobacterial PAOs.

=== Pseudomonas spp. ===
Some unnamed species of the Pseudomonas genus have been observed to exhibit PAO phenotypes.

=== Paracoccus denitrificans ===
Paracoccus denitrificans has been observed to exhibit a non-canonical PAO phenotype.

=== Quatrionicoccus australiensis ===
Quatrionicoccus australiensis is a bacteria isolated from activated sludge which has been found to accumulate polyphosphate and PHA, thus likely having a classical PAO phenotype.

=== Malikia granosa ===
Malikia granosa is a bacteria isolated from activated sludge which has been found to accumulate polyphosphate and PHA, thus likely having a classical PAO phenotype.

=== Lampropedia spp. ===
Lampropedia species, isolated from EBPR activated sludge, have been found to accumulate polyphosphate and PHA, though not to extreme degrees.

=== Candidatus Microthrix ===
Candidatus Microthrix, identified in more than one EBPR activated sludge source, is a filamentous bacteria suspected to be responsible for phosphate removal during the bulking phase of EBPR, where other PAOs decrease in abundance.

=== Gemmatimonas aurantiaca ===
Gemmatimonas aurantiaca is a bacteria isolated from activated sludge that has been observed to accumulate polyphosphate granules.
