= Enhanced biological phosphorus removal =

Enhanced biological phosphorus removal (EBPR) is a sewage treatment configuration applied to activated sludge systems for the removal of phosphate.

The common element in EBPR implementations is the presence of an anaerobic tank (nitrate and oxygen are absent) prior to the aeration tank. Under these conditions a group of heterotrophic bacteria, called polyphosphate-accumulating organisms (PAO) are selectively enriched in the bacterial community within the activated sludge. In the subsequent aerobic phase, these bacteria can accumulate large quantities of polyphosphate within their cells and the removal of phosphorus is said to be enhanced. EBPR can also integrate biological nitrogen removal through the addition of an anoxic zone where nitrate is present due to the denitrification capabilities of some PAO.

Generally speaking, all bacteria contain a fraction (1-2%) of phosphorus in their biomass due to its presence in cellular components, such as membrane phospholipids and DNA. Therefore, as bacteria in a wastewater treatment plant consume nutrients in the wastewater, they grow and phosphorus is incorporated into the bacterial biomass. When PAOs grow they not only consume phosphorus for cellular components but also accumulate large quantities of polyphosphate within their cells. Thus, the phosphorus fraction of phosphorus accumulating biomass is 5-7%. In mixed bacterial cultures the phosphorus content will be maximal 3 - 4 % on total organic mass. If additional chemical precipitation takes place, for example to reach discharge limits, the P-content could be higher, but that is not affected by EBPR. This biomass is then separated from the treated (purified) water at end of the process and the phosphorus is thus removed. Thus if PAOs are selectively enriched by the EBPR configuration, considerably more phosphorus is removed, compared to the relatively poor phosphorus removal in conventional activated sludge systems.

== See also ==
- List of waste-water treatment technologies
