= Secondary treatment =

Biological treatment process for wastewater or sewage

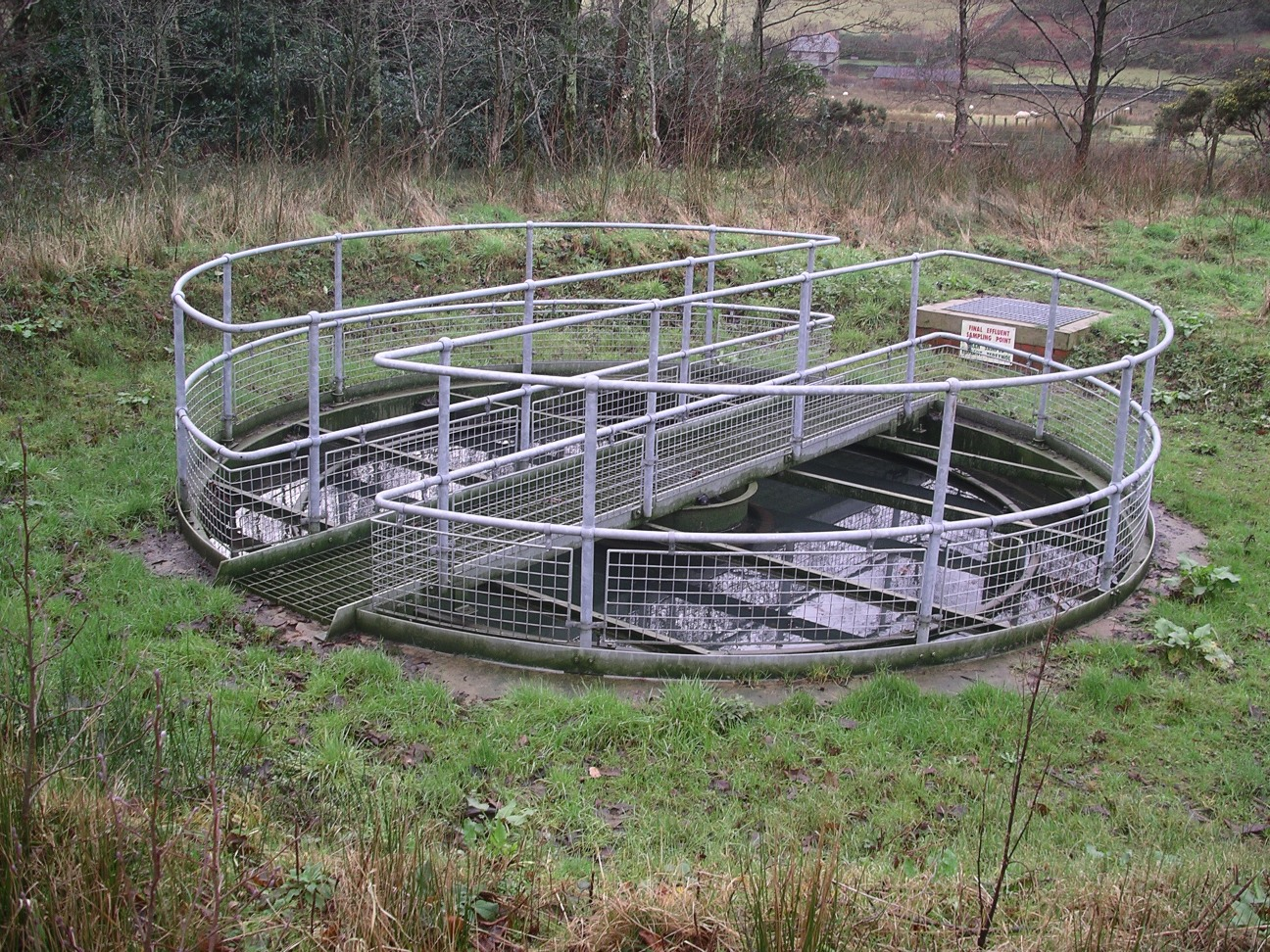
This small secondary clarifier at a rural sewage treatment plant is a typical phase separation mechanism to remove biological solids formed in a suspended growth or fixed-film bioreactor.

Secondary treatment (mostly biological wastewater treatment) is the removal of biodegradable organic matter (in solution or suspension) from sewage or similar kinds of wastewater. The aim is to achieve a certain degree of effluent quality in a sewage treatment plant suitable for the intended disposal or reuse option. A "primary treatment" step often precedes secondary treatment, whereby physical phase separation is used to remove settleable solids. During secondary treatment, biological processes are used to remove dissolved and suspended organic matter measured as biochemical oxygen demand (BOD). These processes are performed by microorganisms in a managed aerobic or anaerobic process depending on the treatment technology. Bacteria and protozoa consume biodegradable soluble organic contaminants (e.g. sugars, fats, and organic short-chain carbon molecules from human waste, food waste, soaps and detergent) while reproducing to form cells of biological solids. Secondary treatment is widely used in sewage treatment and is also applicable to many agricultural and industrial wastewaters.

Secondary treatment systems are classified as fixed-film or suspended-growth systems, and as aerobic versus anaerobic. Fixed-film or attached growth systems include trickling filters, constructed wetlands, bio-towers, and rotating biological contactors, where the biomass grows on media and the sewage passes over its surface. The fixed-film principle has further developed into moving bed biofilm reactors (MBBR) and Integrated Fixed-Film Activated Sludge (IFAS) processes. Suspended-growth systems include activated sludge, which is an aerobic treatment system, based on the maintenance and recirculation of a complex biomass composed of micro-organisms (bacteria and protozoa) able to absorb and adsorb the organic matter carried in the wastewater. Constructed wetlands are also being used. An example for an anaerobic secondary treatment system is the upflow anaerobic sludge blanket reactor.

Fixed-film systems are more able to cope with drastic changes in the amount of biological material and can provide higher removal rates for organic material and suspended solids than suspended growth systems. Most of the aerobic secondary treatment systems include a secondary clarifier to settle out and separate biological floc or filter material grown in the secondary treatment bioreactor.

== Definitions ==
=== Influent ===
Sewage treatment plants that are connected to a combined sewer system sometimes have a bypass arrangement after the primary treatment unit. This means that during very heavy rainfall events, the secondary and tertiary treatment systems can be bypassed to protect them from hydraulic overloading, and the mixture of sewage and storm-water receives primary treatment only.

=== Primary treatment ===
Primary treatment settling removes about half of the solids and a third of the BOD from raw sewage by settling.

=== Secondary treatment ===
Secondary treatment is defined as the "removal of biodegradable organic matter (in solution or suspension) and suspended solids. Disinfection is also typically included in the definition of conventional secondary treatment." Biological nutrient removal is regarded by some sanitary engineers as secondary treatment and by others as tertiary treatment.

After this kind of treatment, the wastewater may be called secondary-treated wastewater.

=== Tertiary treatment ===
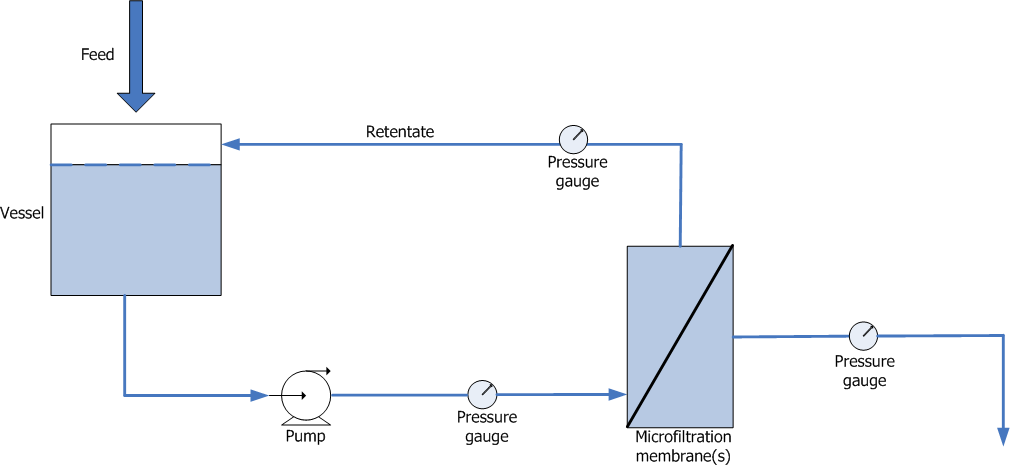
Overall setup for a micro filtration system

Advanced sewage treatment generally involves three main stages, called primary, secondary and tertiary treatment but may also include intermediate stages and final polishing processes. The purpose of tertiary treatment (also called advanced treatment) is to provide a final treatment stage to further improve the effluent quality before it is discharged to the receiving water body or reused. More than one tertiary treatment process may be used at any treatment plant. If disinfection is practiced, it is always the final process. It is also called effluent polishing. Tertiary treatment may include biological nutrient removal (alternatively, this can be classified as secondary treatment), disinfection and partly removal of micropollutants, such as environmental persistent pharmaceutical pollutants.

== Process types ==
Secondary treatment systems are classified as fixed-film or suspended-growth systems. A great number of secondary treatment processes exist, see List of wastewater treatment technologies. The main ones are explained below.

=== Fixed film systems ===
==== Filter beds (oxidizing beds) ====
In older plants and those receiving variable loadings, trickling filter beds are used where the settled sewage liquor is spread onto the surface of a bed made up of coke (carbonized coal), limestone chips or specially fabricated plastic media. Such media must have large surface areas to support the biofilms that form. The liquor is typically distributed through perforated spray arms. The distributed liquor trickles through the bed and is collected in drains at the base. These drains also provide a source of air which percolates up through the bed, keeping it aerobic. Biofilms of bacteria, protozoa and fungi form on the media's surfaces and eat or otherwise reduce the organic content. The filter removes a small percentage of the suspended organic matter, while the majority of the organic matter supports microorganism reproduction and cell growth from the biological oxidation and nitrification taking place in the filter. With this aerobic oxidation and nitrification, the organic solids are converted into biofilm grazed by insect larvae, snails, and worms which help maintain an optimal thickness. Overloading of beds may increase biofilm thickness leading to anaerobic conditions and possible bioclogging of the filter media and ponding on the surface.

==== Rotating biological contactors ====
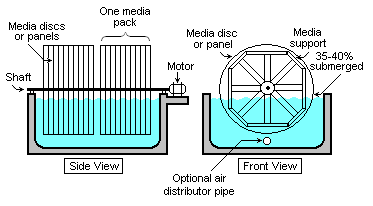
Schematic diagram of a typical rotating biological contactor (RBC). The treated effluent clarifier/settler is not included in the diagram.

A rotating biological contactor or RBC is a biological fixed-film treatment process used in the secondary treatment of wastewater following primary treatment. The primary treatment process involves removal of grit, sand and coarse suspended material through a screening process, followed by settling of suspended solids. The RBC process allows the wastewater to come in contact with a biological film in order to remove pollutants in the wastewater before discharge of the treated wastewater to the environment, usually a body of water (river, lake or ocean). A rotating biological contactor is a type of secondary (biological) treatment process. It consists of a series of closely spaced, parallel discs mounted on a rotating shaft which is supported just above the surface of the wastewater. Microorganisms grow on the surface of the discs where biological degradation of the wastewater pollutants takes place.

==== Constructed wetlands ====
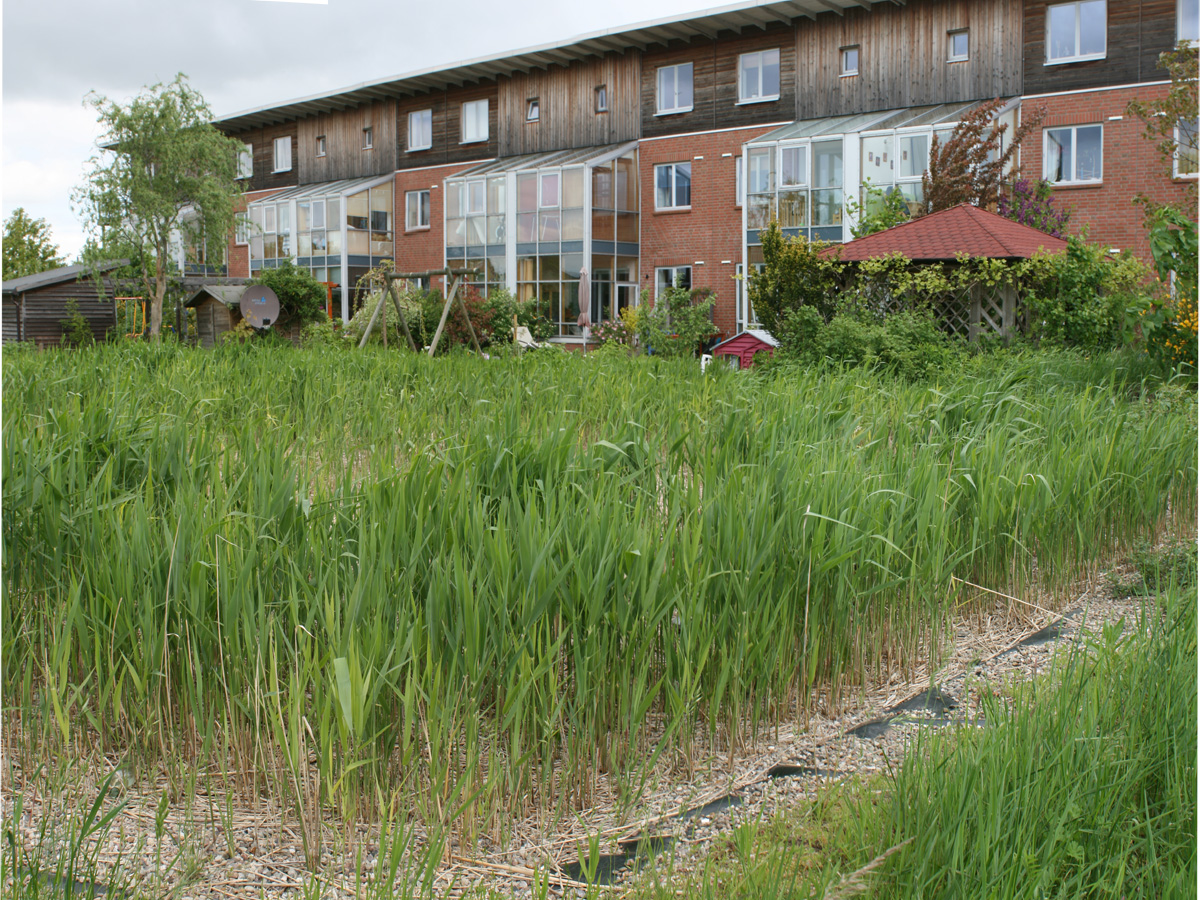
Constructed wetland in an ecological settlement in Flintenbreite near Lübeck, Germany

A constructed wetland is an artificial wetland to treat sewage, greywater, stormwater runoff or industrial wastewater. It may also be designed for land reclamation after mining, or as a mitigation step for natural areas lost to land development. Constructed wetlands are engineered systems that use the natural functions of vegetation, soil, and organisms to provide secondary treatment to wastewater. The design of the constructed wetland has to be adjusted according to the type of wastewater to be treated. Constructed wetlands have been used in both centralized and decentralized wastewater systems. Primary treatment is recommended when there is a large amount of suspended solids or soluble organic matter (measured as biochemical oxygen demand and chemical oxygen demand).

=== Suspended growth systems ===
==== Activated sludge ====
A generalized schematic of an activated sludge process.

Activated sludge is a common suspended-growth method of secondary treatment. Activated sludge plants encompass a variety of mechanisms and processes using dissolved oxygen to promote growth of biological floc that substantially removes organic material. Biological floc is an ecosystem of living biota subsisting on nutrients from the inflowing primary clarifier effluent. These mostly carbonaceous dissolved solids undergo aeration to be broken down and either biologically oxidized to carbon dioxide or converted to additional biological floc of reproducing micro-organisms. Nitrogenous dissolved solids (amino acids, ammonia, etc.) are similarly converted to biological floc or oxidized by the floc to nitrites, nitrates, and, in some processes, to nitrogen gas through denitrification. While denitrification is encouraged in some treatment processes, denitrification often impairs the settling of the floc causing poor quality effluent in many suspended aeration plants. Overflow from the activated sludge mixing chamber is sent to a clarifier where the suspended biological floc settles out while the treated water moves into tertiary treatment or disinfection. Settled floc is returned to the mixing basin to continue growing in primary effluent. Like most ecosystems, population changes among activated sludge biota can reduce treatment efficiency. Nocardia, a floating brown foam sometimes misidentified as sewage fungus, is the best known of many different fungi and protists that can overpopulate the floc and cause process upsets. Elevated concentrations of toxic wastes including pesticides, industrial metal plating waste, or extreme pH, can kill the biota of an activated sludge reactor ecosystem.

===== Sequencing batch reactors =====
One type of system that combines secondary treatment and settlement is the cyclic activated sludge (CASSBR), or sequencing batch reactor (SBR). Typically, activated sludge is mixed with raw incoming sewage, and then mixed and aerated. The settled sludge is run off and re-aerated before a proportion is returned to the headworks.

The disadvantage of the CASSBR process is that it requires a precise control of timing, mixing and aeration. This precision is typically achieved with computer controls linked to sensors. Such a complex, fragile system is unsuited to places where controls may be unreliable, poorly maintained, or where the power supply may be intermittent.

===== Package plants =====
There are a wide range of types of package plants, often serving small communities or industrial plants that may use hybrid treatment processes often involving the use of aerobic sludge to treat the incoming sewage. In such plants the primary settlement stage of treatment may be omitted. In these plants, a biotic floc is created which provides the required substrate. Package plants are designed and fabricated by specialty engineering firms in dimensions that allow for their transportation to the job site in public highways, typically width and height of 3.7 by 3.7 metres (12 ft × 12 ft). Length varies with capacity with larger plants being fabricated in pieces and welded on site. Steel is preferred over synthetic materials (e.g., plastic) for its durability. Package plants are commonly variants of extended aeration, to promote the "fit and forget" approach required for small communities without dedicated operational staff. There are various standards to assist with their design.

Extended aeration package plants use separate basins for aeration and settling, and are somewhat larger than SBR plants with reduced timing sensitivity.

===== Membrane bioreactors =====
Membrane bioreactors (MBR) are activated sludge systems using a membrane liquid-solid phase separation process. The membrane component uses low pressure microfiltration or ultrafiltration membranes and eliminates the need for a secondary clarifier or filtration. The membranes are typically immersed in the aeration tank; however, some applications utilize a separate membrane tank. One of the key benefits of an MBR system is that it effectively overcomes the limitations associated with poor settling of sludge in conventional activated sludge (CAS) processes. The technology permits bioreactor operation with considerably higher mixed liquor suspended solids (MLSS) concentration than CAS systems, which are limited by sludge settling. The process is typically operated at MLSS in the range of 8,000–12,000 mg/L, while CAS are operated in the range of 2,000–3,000 mg/L. The elevated biomass concentration in the MBR process allows for very effective removal of both soluble and particulate biodegradable materials at higher loading rates. Thus increased sludge retention times, usually exceeding 15 days, ensure complete nitrification even in extremely cold weather.

The cost of building and operating an MBR is often higher than conventional methods of sewage treatment. Membrane filters can be blinded with grease or abraded by suspended grit and lack a clarifier's flexibility to pass peak flows. The technology has become increasingly popular for reliably pretreated waste streams and has gained wider acceptance where infiltration and inflow have been controlled, however, and the life-cycle costs have been steadily decreasing. The small footprint of MBR systems, and the high quality effluent produced, make them particularly useful for water reuse applications.

===== Aerobic granulation =====
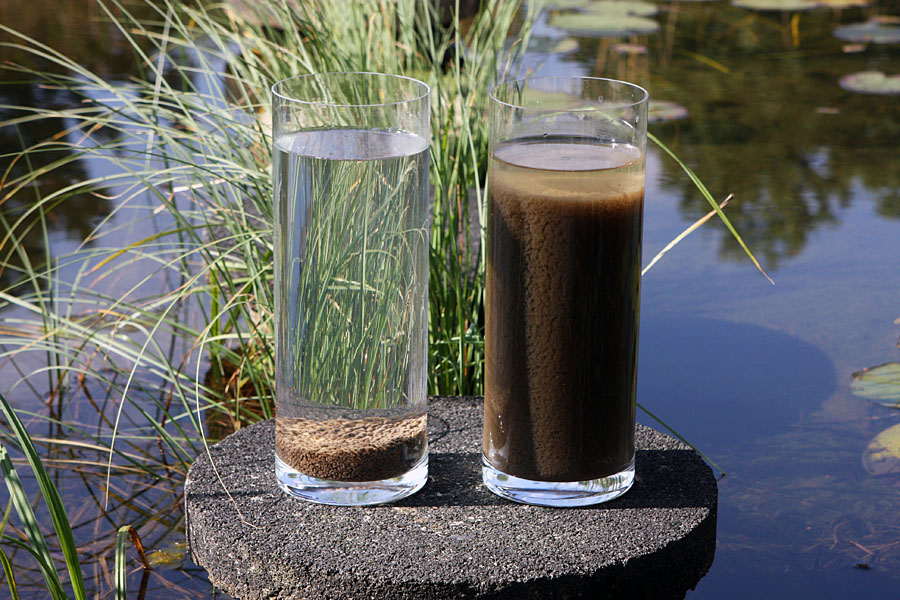

Aerobic granular sludge can be formed by applying specific process conditions that favour slow growing organisms such as PAOs (polyphosphate accumulating organisms) and GAOs (glycogen accumulating organisms). Another key part of granulation is selective wasting whereby slow settling floc-like sludge is discharged as waste sludge and faster settling biomass is retained. This process has been commercialized as Nereda process.

==== Surface-aerated lagoons or ponds ====
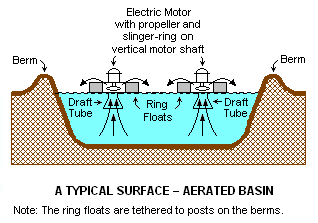
A typical surface-aerated basin (using motor-driven floating aerators)

Aerated lagoons are a low technology suspended-growth method of secondary treatment using motor-driven aerators floating on the water surface to increase atmospheric oxygen transfer to the lagoon and to mix the lagoon contents. The floating surface aerators are typically rated to deliver the amount of air equivalent to 1.8 to 2.7 kg O_{2}/kW·h. Aerated lagoons provide less effective mixing than conventional activated sludge systems and do not achieve the same performance level. The basins may range in depth from 1.5 to 5.0 metres. Surface-aerated basins achieve 80 to 90 percent removal of BOD with retention times of 1 to 10 days. Many small municipal sewage systems in the United States (1 million gal./day or less) use aerated lagoons.

=== Emerging technologies ===
- Biological Aerated (or Anoxic) Filter (BAF) or Biofilters combine filtration with biological carbon reduction, nitrification or denitrification. BAF usually includes a reactor filled with a filter media. The media is either in suspension or supported by a gravel layer at the foot of the filter. The dual purpose of this media is to support highly active biomass that is attached to it and to filter suspended solids. Carbon reduction and ammonia conversion occurs in aerobic mode and sometime achieved in a single reactor while nitrate conversion occurs in anoxic mode. BAF is operated either in upflow or downflow configuration depending on design specified by manufacturer.
- Integrated Fixed-Film Activated Sludge
- Moving Bed Biofilm Reactors (MBBRs) typically requires smaller footprint than suspended-growth systems.

== Design considerations ==
The United States Environmental Protection Agency (EPA) defined secondary treatment based on the performance observed at late 20th-century bioreactors treating typical United States municipal sewage. Secondary treated sewage is expected to produce effluent with a monthly average of less than 30 mg/L BOD and less than 30 mg/L suspended solids. Weekly averages may be up to 50 percent higher. A sewage treatment plant providing both primary and secondary treatment is expected to remove at least 85 percent of the BOD and suspended solids from domestic sewage. The EPA regulations describe stabilization ponds as providing treatment equivalent to secondary treatment removing 65 percent of the BOD and suspended solids from incoming sewage and discharging approximately 50 percent higher effluent concentrations than modern bioreactors. The regulations also recognize the difficulty of meeting the specified removal percentages from combined sewers, dilute industrial wastewater, or Infiltration/Inflow.

=== Process upsets ===
Process upsets are temporary decreases in treatment plant performance caused by significant population change within the secondary treatment ecosystem. Conditions likely to create upsets include toxic chemicals and unusually high or low concentrations of organic waste BOD providing food for the bioreactor ecosystem.

Measures creating uniform wastewater loadings tend to reduce the probability of upsets. Fixed-film or attached growth secondary treatment bioreactors are similar to a plug flow reactor model circulating water over surfaces colonized by biofilm, while suspended-growth bioreactors resemble a continuous stirred-tank reactor keeping microorganisms suspended while water is being treated. Secondary treatment bioreactors may be followed by a physical phase separation to remove biological solids from the treated water. Upset duration of fixed film secondary treatment systems may be longer because of the time required to recolonize the treatment surfaces. Suspended growth ecosystems may be restored from a population reservoir. Activated sludge recycle systems provide an integrated reservoir if upset conditions are detected in time for corrective action. Sludge recycle may be temporarily turned off to prevent sludge washout during peak storm flows when dilution keeps BOD concentrations low. Suspended growth activated sludge systems can be operated in a smaller space than fixed-film trickling filter systems that treat the same amount of water; but fixed-film systems are better able to cope with drastic changes in the amount of biological material and can provide higher removal rates for organic material and suspended solids than suspended growth systems.

Wastewater flow variations may be reduced by limiting stormwater collection by the sewer system, and by requiring industrial facilities to discharge batch process wastes to the sewer over a time interval rather than immediately after creation. Discharge of appropriate organic industrial wastes may be timed to sustain the secondary treatment ecosystem through periods of low residential waste flow. Sewage treatment systems experiencing holiday waste load fluctuations may provide alternative food to sustain secondary treatment ecosystems through periods of reduced use. Small facilities may prepare a solution of soluble sugars. Others may find compatible agricultural wastes, or offer disposal incentives to septic tank pumpers during low use periods.

=== Toxicity ===
Waste containing biocide concentrations exceeding the secondary treatment ecosystem tolerance level may kill a major fraction of one or more important ecosystem species. BOD reduction normally accomplished by that species temporarily ceases until other species reach a suitable population to utilize that food source, or the original population recovers as biocide concentrations decline.

=== Dilution ===
Waste containing unusually low BOD concentrations may fail to sustain the secondary treatment population required for normal waste concentrations. The reduced population surviving the starvation event may be unable to completely utilize available BOD when waste loads return to normal. Dilution may be caused by addition of large volumes of relatively uncontaminated water such as stormwater runoff into a combined sewer. Smaller sewage treatment plants may experience dilution from cooling water discharges, major plumbing leaks, firefighting, or draining large swimming pools.

A similar problem occurs as BOD concentrations drop when low flow increases waste residence time within the secondary treatment bioreactor. Secondary treatment ecosystems of college communities acclimated to waste loading fluctuations from student work/sleep cycles may have difficulty surviving school vacations. Secondary treatment systems accustomed to routine production cycles of industrial facilities may have difficulty surviving industrial plant shutdown. Populations of species feeding on incoming waste initially decline as concentration of those food sources decrease. Population decline continues as ecosystem predator populations compete for a declining population of lower trophic level organisms.

=== Peak waste load ===
High BOD concentrations initially exceed the ability of the secondary treatment ecosystem to utilize available food. Ecosystem populations of aerobic organisms increase until oxygen transfer limitations of the secondary treatment bioreactor are reached. Secondary treatment ecosystem populations may shift toward species with lower oxygen requirements, but failure of those species to use some food sources may produce higher effluent BOD concentrations. More extreme increases in BOD concentrations may drop oxygen concentrations before the secondary treatment ecosystem population can adjust, and cause an abrupt population decrease among important species. Normal BOD removal efficiency will not be restored until populations of aerobic species recover after oxygen concentrations rise to normal.

=== Temperature ===
Biological oxidation processes are sensitive to temperature and, between 0 °C and 40 °C, the rate of biological reactions increase with temperature. Most surface aerated vessels operate at between 4 °C and 32 °C.

== See also ==
- List of wastewater treatment technologies
- Sanitation
