= Aerobic granular reactor =

Community of microbial organisms

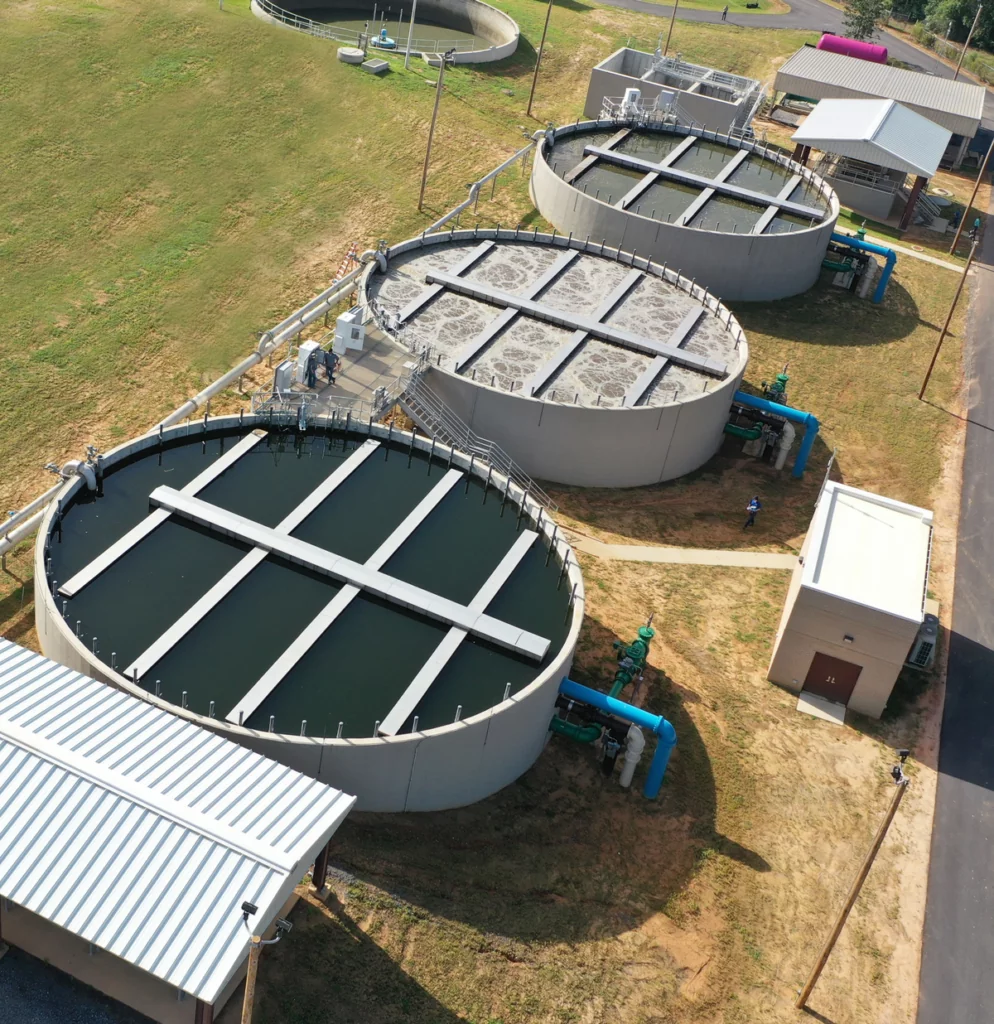
Wolf Creek Wastewater Treatment Plant in Foley, Alabama

Aerobic granular reactors (AGR) or Aerobic granular sludge (AGS) are a community of microbial organisms, typically around 0.5-3mm in diameter, that remove carbon, nitrogen, phosphorus and other pollutants in a single sludge system. It can also be used for wastewater treatments. Aerobic granular sludge is composed of bacteria, protozoa and fungi, which allows oxygen to follow in and biologically oxidize organic pollutants. AGS is a type of wastewater treatment process for sewages and/or industrial waste treatment. AGR was first discovered by UK engineers, Edward Ardern and W.T. Lockett who were researching better ways for sewage disposal. Another scientist by the name of Dr. Gilbert Fowler, who was at the University of Manchester working on an experiment based on aeration of sewage in a bottle coated with algae. Eventually, all three scientists were able to collaborate with one another to discover AGR/AGS.

== Conventional Activated Sludge Process ==
In most conventional activated sludge processes or aerobic granular reactor, the microorganisms grow in flocs. Flocs are defined as a mass of microorganisms that are held together by slime or fungal filaments, which help with aerobic decomposition and trapping particles (et al. Wilen). Activated sludges are built with two physical separate tanks. One tank is specifically designed for aeration, where biological reactions happen. The second tank or the “settling tank” is where treated water is separated from flocculation. This is the most important part because the biomass is in the form of the flocculent sludge, which consists of extracellular polymeric substances. There are some downfalls to using a conventional AGS system because they tend to have low biomass in the aeration tank and settling tank.

== Role of Extracellular Polymeric Substance ==
The extracellular polymeric substance (EPS) matrix is a very important part of the aerobic granular system because it aggregates the microorganism. EPS brings structural stability to the AGS which promotes microbial aggregation. Many researchers use fluorophores and confocal laser scanning microscopes to observe microbial cells in order to determine the stability of the AGS.

== Wastewater Treatment/Aerobic granulation ==
Aerobic granules have been successfully used in real wastewater treatment and are relatively new technology. It was started in the 1990s with a mixture of microbial communities generated into wastewater using an aerobic sequencing batch reactor. Aerobic granules are different from AGS due to their microbial flocs. Aerobic granules can still be effective even without the flocculating agents. Thus, the reduction of biomass makes the granules cost effective and more advantageous. Instead of having two tanks, the aeration tank and the settling tank, aerobic granules can use the same reactor for both treatments. By using one reactor we can save space and less time constructing a second tank, which takes lots of time and money. Making the switch from an AGR to aerobic granules saves 75% land capacity to create a wastewater treatment plant.

== Nitrification, Denitrification and Phosphorus removal ==
A high concentration of biomass allows for microbes such as nitrifiers, denitrifiers, phosphorus accumulating organisms, and denitrifying phosphorus accumulating organisms to effectively treat domestic wastewater. Carbon source is of vital importance to biological phosphorus removal due to the availability of volatile fatty acids, which ultimately shape the compositions of phosphorus accumulating organisms. Recent studies revealed that adding glucose as a carbon source can reduce diversity in the microbial community. Glucose was more favorable for accumulation of nitrite oxidizing bacteria than Ammonia Oxidizing bacteria in contrast with sodium acetate. This study suggested that mixed carbon source by sodium acetate and glucose might act as a strategy to adjust the microbial community compositions within the simultaneous nitrification, denitrification and phosphorus removal system.

== Biodegradation of Pollutants ==
Aerobic granulation has the ability to successfully biodegrade phenol at high concentrations as high as 250 to 2500 mg L-1. This is one of the highest biodegradation of an aerobic reactor. Another pollutant that aerobic granules can biodegrade is 4-chloroaniline. This can really impact the wastewater treatment industry because of the effectiveness of removing these compounds. Dye and hydrophobic compounds can also be used in aerobic graduation to remove pollutants as well. Heavy metal can also be removed/absorbed from industrial wastewater by the aerobic granulation.

== Challenges of Aerobic Granulation ==
It has not been discovered as of yet, where 100% of the sludge is in granular form. Most aerobic granular sludge has 50% and the remaining composition is dense microorganism. Overall, wastewater treatment technology is new and it will be difficult to replace conventional activated sludge processes for the usage of wastewater treatment. Converting an activating sludge to an aerobic granular is very challenging and would need lots of research with grant funds. Therefore, aerobic granulation research needs to be composed to formulate the best mechanisms for wastewater treatment.

== Overview ==
Sewage treatment plants (STP) based on activated sludge often cover large surface areas, necessitated mainly by the large settling tanks. To build compact STP's, biomass can be grown as biofilms on a carrier material, or as fast settling aerobic granular sludge without a carrier. Recent research showed the advantages of a discontinuously fed system, in which it is possible to grow stable granulated sludge under aerobic conditions.

Simultaneous Chemical oxygen demand, and Nitrogen and Phosphorus removal, can be easily integrated in a discontinuous fed system. Because of the high settling capacity of the granules, the use of a traditional settler is unnecessary. Therefore, the installation can be built very compact, needing only 20% of the surface area of conventional activated sludge systems.

== Benefits/Key features ==
- Small Footprint
- Proven enhanced nutrient removal (ENR)
- Up to 50-percent energy savings
- Excellent settling
- No chemical addition
- Resilient to fluctuations in pH, toxic shocks, loadings, and flows
- Easy operation with fully automated controls

== See also ==
- List of waste water treatment technologies
- Aerobic granulation
- Membrane bioreactor
- Waste management
