= Moving-bed biofilm reactor =

Type of wastewater treatment

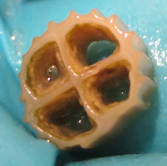
K1 MBBR carrier with biofilm

Moving-bed biofilm reactor (MBBR) is a type of wastewater treatment process that was first invented by Professor Hallvard Ødegaard at Norwegian University of Science and Technology in the late 1980s. The process takes place in an aeration tank with plastic carriers that a biofilm can grow on. The compact size and cheap wastewater treatment costs offers many advantages for the system, such as water reuse and nutrient removal or recovery. In theory, wastewater will be no longer considered waste—it can be considered a resource.

== Background ==
=== Overview ===
Due to early issues with biofilm reactors, like hydraulic instability and uneven biofilm distribution, moving-bed biofilm technology was developed. The MBBR system consists of an aeration tank (similar to an activated sludge tank) with special plastic carriers that provide a surface where a biofilm can grow. There is a wide variety of plastic carriers used in these systems. These carriers vary in surface area and in shape, each offering different advantages and disadvantages. Surface area plays a very important role in biofilm formation. Free-floating carriers allow biofilms to form on the surface; therefore, a large internal surface area is crucial for contact with water, air, bacteria, and nutrients. The carriers will be mixed in the tank by the aeration system and thus will have good contact between the substrate in the influent wastewater and the biomass on the carriers. The most preferable material is currently high-density polyethylene (HDPE) due to its plasticity, density, and durability.

To achieve higher concentrations of biomass in the bioreactors, hybrid MBBR systems have been used where suspended and attached biomass co-exist, contributing both to biological processes. Additionally, there are anaerobic MBBRs that have been mainly used for industrial wastewater treatment. A 2019 article described a combination of anaerobic (methanogenic) MBBR with aerobic MBBR that was applied in a municipal wastewater treatment laboratory, with simultaneous production of biogas.

=== History ===
The development of MBBR technology is attributed to Professor Hallvard Ødegaard and his colleagues at Norwegian University of Science and Technology (NTNU). This is traced back to the late 1970s to early 1980s. The first MBBR pilot plant was installed at NTNU in the early 1980s; its success lead to the construction and start-up of the first full-scale MBBR plant in Norway in 1985. It was commercialized by Kaldnes Miljöteknologi (now called AnoxKaldnes and owned by Veolia Water Technologies). Since then, MBBR technology has been widely adopted throughout the world, mainly in Europe and Asia. Now, there are over 700 wastewater treatment systems (both municipal and industrial) installed in over 50 countries.

== Current Usage ==
Today, MBBR technology is used for municipal sewage treatment, industrial wastewater treatment, and decentralized wastewater treatment. This technology has been used in many different industries, including the automotive, chemical, food and beverage, and metal plating and finishing industries.

The MBBR system is considered a biofilm or biological process, not a chemical or mechanical process. Other conventional biofilm processes for wastewater treatment are called trickling filter, rotating biological contactor (RBC), and biological aerated filter (BAF).

Important applications include nitrification, denitrification, BOD/COD removal, and anammox.

=== Methods ===
There are many design components of MBBR that come together to make the technology highly efficient. First, the process occurs in a basin (or aeration tank). The overall size of this tank is dependent on both the type and volume of wastewater being processed. The influent enters the basin at the beginning of treatment. The second component is the media, which consists of the free-floating biocarriers mentioned earlier and can occupy as much as 70 percent of the tank. Third, an aeration grid is responsible for helping the media move through the basin and ensuring that the carriers come into contact with as much waste as possible, in addition to introducing more oxygen into the basin. Lastly, a sieve keeps all the carriers in the tank to prevent the plastic carriers from escaping the aeration.

Though there are a few different methods, they all use the same design components. The continuous-flow method involves the continuous flow of wastewater into the basin, with an equal flow of treated water exiting through the sieve. The intermittent aeration method operates in cycles of aeration and non-aeration, allowing for both aerobic conditions and anoxic conditions. The sequencing batch reactor (SBR) method is completed in a single reactor where several treatment steps occur in a sequence, where the treated water is removed before the cycle begins again. Large-diameter submersible mixers are commonly used as a method for mixing in these systems.

=== Removal of micropollutants ===
Moving-bed biofilm reactors have shown promising results for the removal of micropollutants (MPs) from wastewater. MPs fall into several groups of chemicals such as pharmaceuticals, organophosphorus pesticides (OPs), care products, and endocrine disruptors. A 2012 article reported the use of MBBR technology to remove pharmaceuticals such as beta-blockers, analgesics, anti-depressants, and antibiotics from hospital wastewater. Moreover, application of MBBR as a biological technique combined with chemical treatment has attracted a great deal of attention for removal of organophosphorus pesticides from wastewater. The advantage of MBBRs can be associated with its high solid-retention time, which allows the proliferation of slow-growing microbial communities with multiple functions in biofilms. The dynamics of such microbial communities greatly depend on organic loading in MBBR systems.

Moving-bed biofilm reactors can efficiently treat hospital wastewater and remove pharmaceutical micropollutants. A 2023 study has shown that a strictly anaerobic MBBR, combined with an aerobic biofilm reactor, can achieve high removal rates of pharmaceuticals, such as metronidazole, trimethoprim, sulfamethoxazole, and valsartan.

== Advantages ==
Biofilm processes in general require less space than activated-sludge systems because the biomass is more concentrated, and the efficiency of the system is less dependent on the final sludge separation. Additionally, MBBR systems do not need a recycling of the sludge, which is the case with activated sludge systems.

The MBBR system is often installed as a retrofit of existing activated-sludge tanks to increase the capacity of the existing system. The degree of filling of carriers can be adapted to the specific situation and the desired capacity. Thus, an existing treatment plant can increase its capacity without increasing the footprint by constructing new tanks.

Some other advantages are:

- Increased performance and volumetric treatment capacity
- Higher effective sludge retention time (SRT) which is favorable for nitrification
- Response to load fluctuations without operator intervention
- Lower sludge production
- Less area required
- Resilience to toxic shock
- Process performance independent of secondary clarifier (due to the fact that there is no sludge return line).

== Disadvantages ==
A disadvantage compared to other biofilm processes is that MBBRs experience bioclogging and build-up of headloss. Depending on the type of waste and design of the process, several problems can occur during the full-scale process. Some of the disadvantages are:

- Feed pipe/effluent sieve blocking
- Nonhomogeneous mixing
- Carrier voids blocking
- Destroyed carriers
- Carriers accumulating at the effluent sieves
- Carrier overflow

== Alternative Wastewater Treatment Systems ==
There are many alternative wastewater treatment systems that can be used in place of MBBRs. The selection of the appropriate system depends on the wastewater coming in, treatment objectives, available space, and budgets. Some other options are:

- Sequencing Batch Reactors (SBR)
- Membrane Bioreactors (MBRs)
- Fixed Film Systems
- Integrated Fixed-Film Activated Sludge (IFAS)
- Submerged Aerated Filters (SAFs)
- Rotating Biological Contactors (RBCs)

== See also ==
- List of waste-water treatment technologies
