= Emmanuel Unuabonah =

Nigerian academic

Emmanuel Iyayi Unuabonah
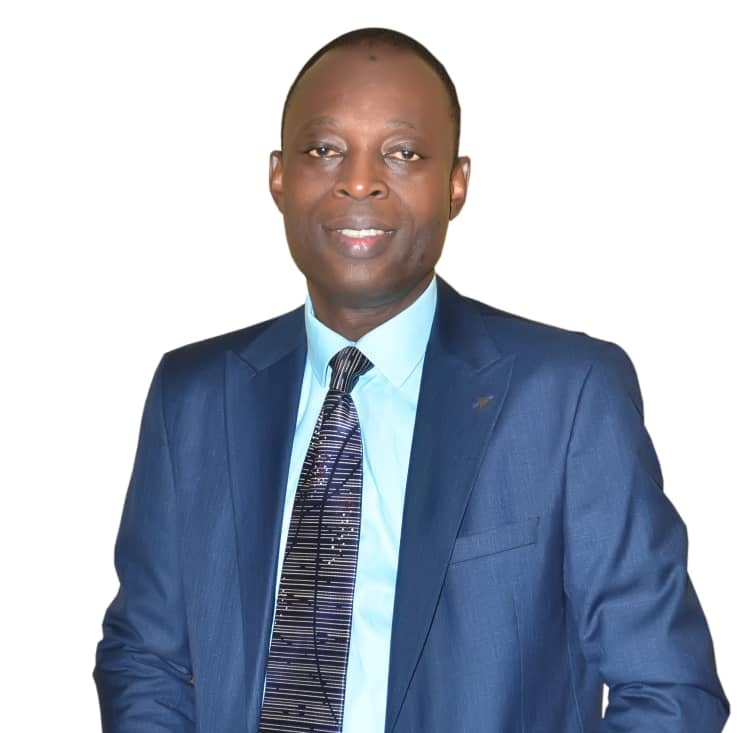
- Professor Emmanuel Unuabonah
- Born: January 16, 1975; Benin City
- Died: March 26, 2025 (aged 50)
- Known for: Water treatment technologies, Environmental sustainability research
- Awards: TWAS-ROSSA Prize (2012)

Academic background
- Education: University of Ibadan

Academic work
- Institutions: Redeemer's University, Bells University of Technology, Federal University of Petroleum Resources Effurun

Emmanuel Iyayi Unuabonah (January 16, 1975 – March 26, 2025) was a Nigerian academic, environmental scientist and professor of Industrial chemistry. Known for his researches on water treatment and environmental sustainability, he was the founding director of the African Centre of Excellence for Water and Environmental Research (ACEWATER) in Redeemer's University in Nigeria. He also served as the president of the Nigerian Young Academy.

== Biography ==
Unuabonah obtained his B.Sc. degree in industrial chemistry from the University of Benin in 1999, and M.Sc. and PhD degrees in industrial chemistry from the University of Ibadan in 2003 and 2007, respectively. During his teaching career at Redeemer's University in Osun State, Nigeria, he served as director of the Directorate of Academic Planning and Quality Assurance and the African Centre of Excellence for Water and Environmental Research. He also served as the president of the Nigerian Young Academy.

Unuabonah died in March 2025.

== Publications ==
Unuabonah was a researcher with well over 100 peer-reviewed publications, with over 5500 citations and an h-index of 41, most of them focused on water treatment technologies, environmental contaminants, and sustainable materials research. His research group developed low-cost, locally sourced composite adsorbents for removal of antibiotics, endocrine disruptors, microplastics, and phenolic compounds from contaminated waters.

He co-edited the Springer Water volume Strategic Management of Wastewater from Intensive Rural Industries (2025), contributing chapters on wastewater from dyeing, textile, oil‑palm processing, and other rural sectors. Selected research highlights include: Clay-based photocatalytic membranes, low‑cost alternative materials for water treatment, Sustainable biomass-clay combos for the abatement of benzenediols, Process optimization and dynamics for water purification, Risk assessment and photo-disinfection of antibiotic residues and antibiotic-resistant bacteria in water sources from Ede, Nigeria, Evaluating the feasibility of creating a zero waste discharge aquaculture system (April 2025), A critical review of toxicity and removal of parabens from water, Regeneration strategies for spent solid matrices used in adsorption of organic pollutants from surface water: a critical review (2016), and Multistage Optimization of the Adsorption of Methylene Blue Dye onto Defatted Carica papaya Seeds (2009).

=== Influence and citations in scientific literature ===
His 2013 paper on hybrid clay prepared from Carica papaya seeds and Kaolinite has been cited as an efficient low‑cost alternative for heavy‑metal removal in later reviews of water‑treatment composites. The research was also covered by international science media, which highlighted potential cost savings for clean water in low‑resource settings. A 2016 critical review on regeneration strategies for adsorbents has been used as a touchstone in subsequent literature surveying regeneration and reusability of low‑cost adsorbents. Broader reviews of clay‑based adsorbents similarly cite and contextualize regeneration approaches relevant to his contributions. Subsequent reviews survey papaya seed as an adsorbent/coagulant and discuss modified papaya‑seed/clay composites, referencing and extending the approach pioneered in HYCA studies. Later experimental studies and technology variants build on the original hybrid‑clay concept to expand performance to anionic pollutants and microbial disinfection, indicating methodological diffusion.

== Media coverage ==
A profile by the World Academy of Sciences described his low‑cost purification research using clay and papaya seeds and noted his TWAS grant support. Multiple Nigerian newspapers covered his Nigerian Academy of Science Gold Medal Prize, including Vanguard, The Guardian, and The Punch. Global coverage of his hybrid clay innovation appeared on notable media emphasizing affordability and impact potential for developing countries. Agência FAPESP reported on a Brazil–Nigeria collaboration led by researchers, including Unuabonah, combining low‑cost composites and solar energy for water decontamination.

== Leadership and Fellowships ==
As the founding President of the Nigerian Young Academy (2010–2014). He was affiliated with several academic societies, including: African Science Leadership Program (Alumnus), Global Young Academy (Alumnus), Nigerian Academy of Science (Fellow), and the African Academy of Sciences (Fellow-elect).
