= Nereda =

Wastewater treatment technology

Nereda is a wastewater treatment technology invented by Mark van Loosdrecht of the Delft University of Technology in the Netherlands. The technology is based on aerobic granulation and is a modification of the activated sludge process.

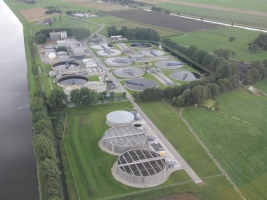

Aerobic granular sludge can be formed by applying specific process conditions that favour slow growing organisms such as PAOs (polyphosphate accumulating organisms) and GAOs (glycogen accumulating organisms). Another key part of granulation is selective washing whereby slow settling floc-like sludge is discharged as waste sludge and faster settling biomass is retained. At the full-scale, the Nereda system consists of a cyclical process with three main cycle components or phases, namely: simultaneous fill and draw, aeration / reaction and settling. The aerobic granules form excellent settling properties allowing for higher biomass concentrations (8 g/L), the non-use of secondary clarifiers and the exclusion of major sludge recycle pumping in the Nereda system – the result is a compact (reduced plant footprints), simple system that requires significantly less chemicals and energy when compared to conventional activated sludge (CAS) systems. The theory of this technology has proven to work in the field and currently more than 90 wastewater treatment plants worldwide are operational, under construction or under design, varying in size from 500 up to 2,4 million person equivalent. The Nereda technology is an invention of the Delft University of Technology and Engineering consultancy Haskoning.

The Nereda derives from the Greek word “Neraida”. Nereda was a water nymph and one of the daughters of Nereus, the wise and benevolent Greek god of the sea. In Greek mythology Nereda is linked with the terms “pure” and “immaculate”, a reference to the water quality produced by the new technology.

== See also ==
- List of waste water treatment technologies
- Water purification
- Sequencing batch reactor
