= Hallvard Ødegaard =

Norwegian professor emeritus

- Born: 11 December 1945; Voss Municipality, Norway
- Education: Norwegian University of Science and Technology
- Known for: Inventing the Moving Bed Biofilm Reactor for wastewater treatment

Hallvard Ødegaard (born 11 December 1945 in Voss Municipality) is a Norwegian professor emeritus from Norwegian University of Science and Technology. He is known as the inventor of the Moving Bed Biofilm Reactor for wastewater treatment.

== Career ==
Ødegaard graduated with a master's degree in civil engineering in 1969 from the Norwegian Institute of Technology (NTH). In 1975 he received his doctoral degree from the same institution. He was employed at the Norwegian Institute for Water Research from 1970 to 1973. Subsequently, he was employed from 1973 to 1975 at the Department of Hydraulic and Environmental Engineering at NTH. He worked from 1975 to 1977 at the regional office for Sør-Trøndelag as a senior engineer. In 1977 he returned to the Department of Hydraulic and Environmental Engineering, where he became a professor in 1985. The Norwegian Institute of Technology later merged to form the Norwegian University of Science and Technology.

He is a fellow of the Norwegian Academy of Technological Sciences.

== Moving Bed Biofilm Reactor (MBBR) ==
MBBR was invented at NTNU in the late 1980s and further investigated and improved in the early 1990s. MBBR is a process that uses special carriers as a biofilm media in an aeration tank of a wastewater treatment system. This makes it possible to construct aeration tanks that are more compact than conventional activated sludge tanks. The process was commercialized by a company called Kaldnes Miljöteknologi, which was later called AnoxKaldnes. This company was later bought by Veolia Water. It is estimated that there is at least 600 municipal and industrial AnoxKaldnes MBBR treatment plants in operation in over 50 different countries. Currently there are various other suppliers of MBBR technology.

== Awards ==
In 2011 the King of Norway announced the designation of Ødegaard as a Knight of the First Class of St. Olav order "for his dedication to water research".
