= List of wastewater treatment technologies =

This page provides a list of wastewater treatment technologies:

- Activated sludge model
- A2O (Anaerobic-Anoxic-Oxic) model
- Activated sludge systems
- Adsorption/Bio-oxidation process
- Advanced oxidation process
- Aerated lagoon
- Aerobic granular reactor
- Aerobic granular sludge technology
- Aerobic granulation
- Aerobic treatment system
- Anaerobic clarigester
- Anaerobic digester types
- Anaerobic digestion
- Anaerobic filter
- Anaerobic lagoon
- Anammox
- API oil–water separator
- Belt filter
- Bioconversion of biomass to mixed alcohol fuels
- Biofilters
- Bioreactor
- Bioretention
- Capacitive deionization
- Carbon filtering
- Cesspit
- Chemical addition wastewater treatment
- Clarifier
- Coarse bubble diffusers
- Composting toilet
- Constructed wetland
- Cross-flow filtration
- Dark fermentation
- Decanter centrifuge
- Decentralized wastewater system
- Diffuser (sewage)
- Dissolved air flotation
- Dissolved gas flotation
- Desalination
- Distillation
- Effluent Decontamination System
- Electro-oxidation
- Electrocoagulation
- Electrodeionization
- Electrodialysis
- Electrolysis
- Enhanced biological phosphorus removal
- Expanded granular sludge bed digestion
- Extended aeration
- Facultative lagoon
- Fenton's reagent
- Filtration
- Fine bubble diffusers
- Flocculation & sedimentation
- Flotation process
- Forward osmosis
- Froth flotation
- Hydrocyclone
- Imhoff tank
- Induced gas flotation
- Integrated Fixed-Film Activated Sludge (IFAS)
- Ion exchange
- Lamella clarifier (inclined plate clarifier)
- Living Machine
- Maceration (sewage)
- Media filter
- Membrane bioreactor
- Membrane distillation
- Membrane fouling
- Microbial fuel cell
- Microflotation
- Moving bed biofilm reactor
- Nanotechnology
- Nereda
- Oil–water separator
- Organisms used in water purification
- Parallel plate oil–water separator
- Photobioreactor
- Reed bed
- Regenerative thermal oxidizer
- Retention basin
- Reverse osmosis
- Rotating biological contactor
- Sand filter
- Screen filter
- Sedimentation (water treatment)
- Septic tank
- Septic tank conversion
- Sequencing batch reactor
- Sewage treatment
- Skimmer (machine)
- Slow sand filter
- Stabilization pond
- Supercritical water oxidation (SCWO)
- Thermal hydrolysis
- Treatment pond
- Trickle-bed reactor
- Trickling filter
- Ultrafiltration
- Ultraviolet disinfection
- Upflow anaerobic sludge blanket digestion
- Urine-diverting dry toilet
- Vermifilter
- Vacuum evaporation
- Wet oxidation

== See also ==
- Agricultural wastewater treatment
- Industrial wastewater treatment
- List of solid waste treatment technologies
- Waste treatment technologies
- Water purification
- Sewage sludge treatment
