= Mark van Loosdrecht =

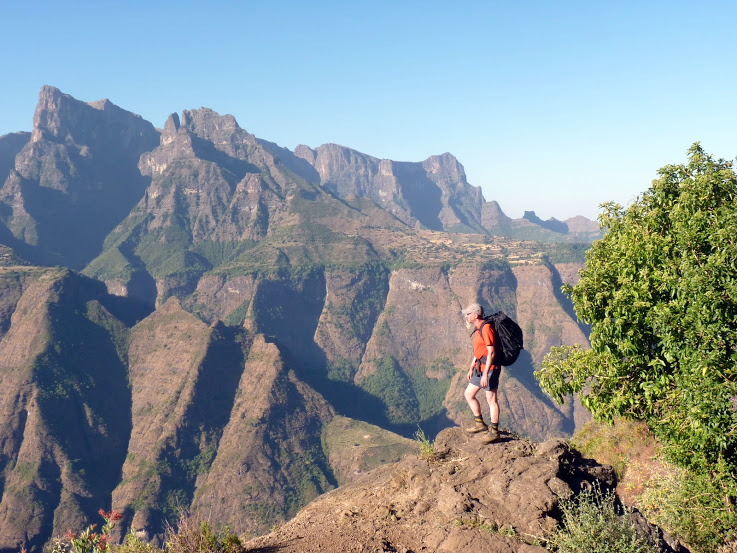
Mark van Loosdrecht

Mark van Loosdrecht (born 1959) is a Dutch professor in environmental biotechnology at Delft University of Technology. He was the creator of Nereda, a wastewater treatment technology developed by a cooperation between the Delft University of Technology, the Dutch Foundation for Applied Water Research (STOWA) and Royal HaskoningDHV.

== Life and career ==
Van Loosdrecht was born in Loon op Zand in 1959. He studied environmental hygiene at Wageningen University and Research and obtained his PhD in 1988. He became a professor at Delft University of Technology in 1999.

Van Loosdrecht is chief editor of the scientific journal Water Research.

== Awards and honours ==
Van Loosdrecht was elected a member of the Royal Netherlands Academy of Arts and Sciences in 2004. In 2015 he was elected an international member of the National Academy of Engineering of the United States. In 2019 he was elected a foreign member of the Chinese Academy of Engineering.

Van Loosdrecht was named Knight in the Order of the Netherlands Lion in 2011. In 2012 Van Loosdrecht was nominated for the European Inventor Award in the Research category for a water purification technology. In 2014 he was one of four winners of the Dutch Spinoza Prize and received a 2,5 million euro grant. He received the award for his research and development on the field of the behaviour of biomass in dynamic conditions. In March 2018 Van Loosdrecht won the Stockholm Water Prize for revolutionizing wastewater treatment. A second laureate in that year was Professor Bruce Rittmann. Their research demonstrated the possibilities to remove harmful contaminants from water, cut wastewater treatment costs, reduce energy consumption, and even recover chemicals and nutrients for recycling.
