= Submersible mixer =

Machine used for mixing liquids and slurries in tanks

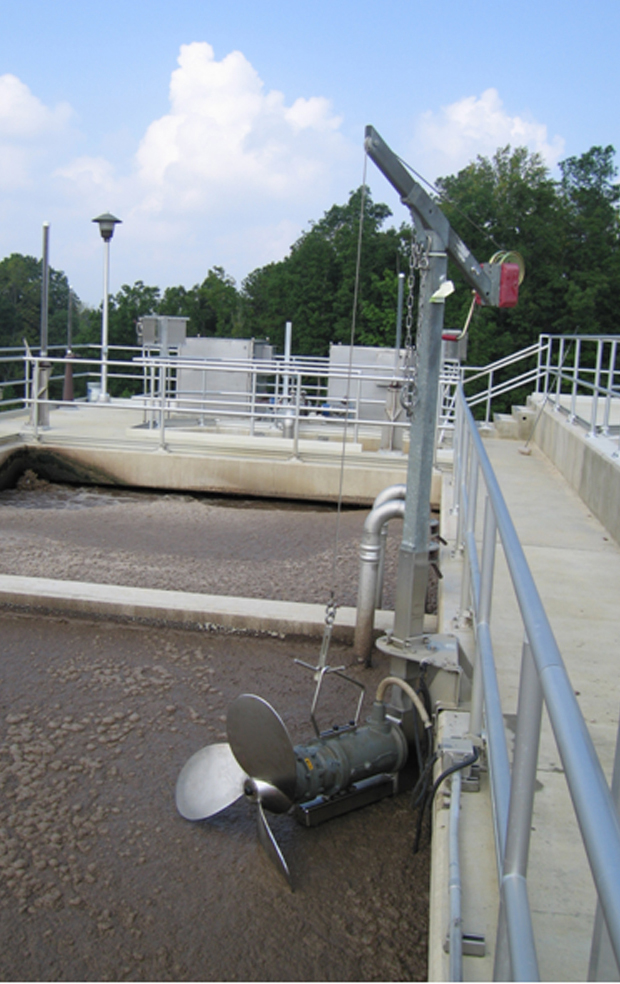
Picture of a submersible gear-driven mixer with stainless steel propeller. The mixer is being installed in an anoxic sludge tank at a sewage treatment plant.

A submersible mixer is a mechanical device that is used to mix sludge tanks and other liquid volumes. Submersible mixers are often used in sewage treatment plants to keep solids in suspension in the various process tanks and/or sludge holding tanks.

== Working principle ==
The submersible mixer is operated by an electric motor, which is coupled to the mixer's propeller, either direct-coupled or via a planetary gear-reducer. The propeller rotates and creates liquid flow in the tank, which in turn keeps the solids in suspension. The submersible mixer is typically installed on a guide rail system, which enables the mixer to be retrieved for periodic inspection and preventive maintenance.

== Applications ==
Examples of applications where submersible mixers are commonly applied:

- Anoxic/anaerobic tanks and oxidation basins (activated sludge) at sewage treatment plants
- IFAS, MBBR, and other fixed film biocarrier processes.
- Mixing of sewage wet wells
- Reception tanks and post-digestion tanks at biogas facilities.
- Liquid Manure storage tanks at dairy, hog, and poultry farms.
- Waste processing at slaughterhouses, poultry abattoirs, fish processing plants, etc.
