= Waste treatment technologies =

There are a number of different waste treatment technologies for the disposal, recycling, storage, or energy recovery from different waste types. Each type has its own associated methods of waste management.

== Landfill ==
Municipal solid waste consists mainly of household and commercial waste which is disposed of by or on behalf of a local authority. Landfills waste are categorized by either being hazardous, non-hazardous or inert waste. In order for a landfill design to be considered it must abide by the following requirements: final landforms profile, site capacity, settlement, waste density, materials requirements and drainage.

== Incineration ==
The advantages of the incineration are reduction of volume and mass by burning, reduction to a percentage of sterile ash, source of energy, increase of income by selling bottom ash, and is also environmentally acceptable.
The disadvantages of incineration are the following:

- higher cost and longer payback period due to high capital investment
- since incineration is design on the basis of a certain calorific value removing paper and plastics for recycling lowers the overall calorific value that may affect the incinerator performance
- the process still produces a solid waste residue at the end which still requires treatment and management

Emissions from incinerators consist of particulates, heavy metals, pollutant gases, odor dust and litter. Due to incomplete combustion, products such as dioxins and furans are formed.

== Bioremediation ==
The human sewage and the process waste from the manufacturing industries are the two major sources of the waste water. In Thailand, the total volume of the wastewater from industries is much greater than that of the domestic sewage. As a result, an effective method is needed. Microbial remediation of xenobiotics has shown to be effective and the low-cost technology, but it still has several limitations. Consequently, the genetic engineering approaches are used to create the new strain of microbes (Genetically engineered microorganisms, GEMS) which have better catabolic potential than the wild type species for bioremediation. There are four major approaches to GEM development for the bioremediation application which include the modification of enzyme specificity and affinity, pathway construction and regulation, bioprocess development, monitoring and control and lastly, bio-affinity bio-receptor sensor application for chemical sensing, toxicity reduction and end point analysis. These allow the extensive use of genetically engineered microorganism. In the far future, the genetically engineered microorganisms could possibly be used to control the green house gases, convert the waste to the value-added product as well as to reduce and capture the carbon dioxide gases from the atmosphere (carbon sequestration), but much research is still required to realise the potential. There is a concern regarding the use of genetically engineered microbes for the remediation of pollutants. Once the genetically microorganisms has been added, it may disperse uncontrollably and hard to be removed.

== Pyrolysis ==
Pyrolysis is thermochemical conversion process in which the feeding material is converted into char, oil and combustible gas in an inert atmosphere (complete absence of oxidizing agent).

== See also ==
- List of radioactive waste treatment technologies
- List of solid waste treatment technologies
- List of wastewater treatment technologies
- Waste-to-energy
