= Sustainable materials use and disposal (conservation of cultural heritage) =

In the field of conservation and restoration of cultural property, greening practices such as sustainable materials use and disposal aim to improve the sustainability of conservation practice by choosing materials and methods that have a lower environmental impact and disposing of materials responsibly. When carrying out conservation treatments or preventive conservation, conservators use resources such as consumable materials, energy and water. These resources have an impact on the environment both through their extraction and disposal. In order to reduce this impact, conservators can choose sustainable alternatives to existing materials and practices such as reusable or recycled materials or materials with reduced toxicity.

== Re-use of materials ==
Where museums cannot completely reduce their use of materials or replace materials with sustainable alternatives, material re-use is an option for extending the useful lifetime of conservation materials. Durable materials used in conservation such as Tyvek or Mylar may be washed and re-used where appropriate. Polyethylene foam may be blended and used as a fill material for object cushioning. Materials may be exchanged with local community organisations such as schools or art centres to extend their life where they cannot be appropriately used in a conservation setting. Professional networks such as American Institute for Conservation and organisations such as KiCulture and Sustainability in Conservation offer tips for material re-use.

== Green solvents and chemicals ==
Conservators regularly use chemicals for treatments such as cleaning. These chemicals may have adverse human or environmental impacts during their production, use or disposal. By applying two of the principles of green chemistry, namely, using safer chemicals and finding safer alternatives to chemicals, conservators can reduce the impact of conservation processes.

Research continues into alternative chemicals to replace industrial solvents and biocides. Alternatives such as tea tree oil and zosteric acid have been tested as a method for reducing mould growth for outdoor stone heritage and indoor storage areas. Materials such as tea leaves have been trialled as alternatives to chemical adsorbents for reducing moisture and acetic acid vapours in the storage of cellulose films.

Reducing reliance on chemicals by adopting alternatives to solvent cleaning can be beneficial for reducing energy use and reducing risk for both people and heritage objects. Replacing solvents with gel systems that utilise enzymes for surface cleaning is one means of reducing stains and residues. Laser cleaning offers a solution for cleaning of many hard surfaces.

== Packing and transport ==
The transportation of cultural materials nationally and internationally can involve significant resource use, from carbon footprints associated with air and road travel and the materials used to safely pack cultural objects for transport. Conservators have investigated sustainable packaging solutions, including re-using housing crates, reducing the quantities of materials used and opting for recycled or eco-certified products. A 2011 study at the National Museum of Wales found that the carbon footprint associated with international transport of materials can be reduced by re-using wrapping and packing materials, leasing and re-fitting packing cases, prioritising sea and rail freight, sharing couriers and strategically planning exhibition schedules, amongst other strategies.

== Waste management ==
At the end of their useful life, the environmental impact of conservation materials may be reduced by disposing of them responsibly. Engaging in a waste audit within a conservation lab or organisation can be a useful way to track what waste is generated and where. In a waste audit, waste is kept on site for a pre-determined period of time and then laid out on a plastic sheet and sorted to assess material types and waste flows. This data can be used to assess the effectiveness of sustainable improvements by carrying out a subsequent audit once solutions have been implemented.

Some conservation materials may be recycled, depending on municipal guidelines. Materials that cannot commonly be recycled locally, such as nitrile gloves or soft plastic, can be recycled through commercial services such as TerraCycle.

== Life Cycle Assessment ==
Life Cycle Assessment has been somewhat applied for measuring the environmental impact of conservation materials to aid in sustainable decision-making. Life cycle assessment calculates the environmental impact of materials, for example energy, water use or greenhouse gas emissions across their lifetimes, from raw material extraction to disposal. As a holistic methodology, life cycle assessment considers a wider range of environmental impacts when compared with other similar methods such as carbon footprints and can be used to holistically identify 'hotspots' in environmental impacts.

The usefulness of LCA for assessing the impacts of conservation materials and chemicals. Members of the American Institute for Conservation have led a project investigating life cycle assessment in an American conservation context. The results of LCA have been used to achieve sustainable improvements in lighting, packing and museums loans. A key outcome has been the development of a carbon calculator and library of case studies based on life cycle assessment results.

== Green initiatives in cultural heritage conservation: the Green Conservation Cluster ==
The Green Conservation Cluster is a European collaborative platform dedicated to advancing environmentally sustainable materials, technologies, and practices in cultural heritage conservation. Established under Horizon Europe in 2022, the cluster brought together three major research projects, GoGreen, MOXY, and GreenArt, all funded under the call for Green Conservation Technologies. Although each project operated independently, they are united by “a shared goal to develop and promote environmentally responsible conservation materials, decision-making, and practices.”
