= Aerobic granulation =

Wastewater treatment process

The biological treatment of wastewater in the sewage treatment plant is often accomplished using conventional activated sludge systems. These systems generally require large surface areas for treatment and biomass separation units due to the generally poor settling properties of the sludge. Aerobic granules are a type of sludge that can self-immobilize flocs and microorganisms into spherical and strong compact structures. The advantages of aerobic granular sludge are excellent settleability, high biomass retention, simultaneous nutrient removal and tolerance to toxicity. Recent studies show that aerobic granular sludge treatment could be a potentially good method to treat high strength wastewaters with nutrients, toxic substances.

The aerobic granular sludge usually is cultivated in SBR (sequencing batch reactor) and applied successfully as a wastewater treatment for high strength wastewater, toxic wastewater and domestic wastewater. Compared with conventional aerobic granular processes for COD removal, current research focuses more on simultaneous nutrient removal, particularly COD, phosphorus and nitrogen, under pressure conditions, such as high salinity or thermophilic condition.

In recent years, new technologies have been developed to improve settleability. The use of aerobic granular sludge technology is one of them.

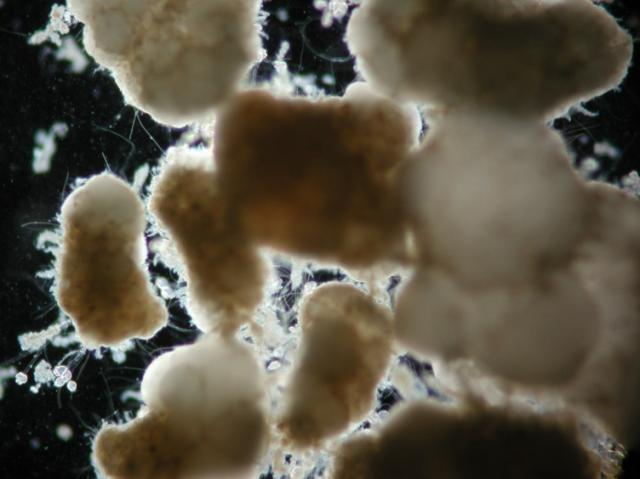
Aerobic Granules derived from municipal sewage AGS application

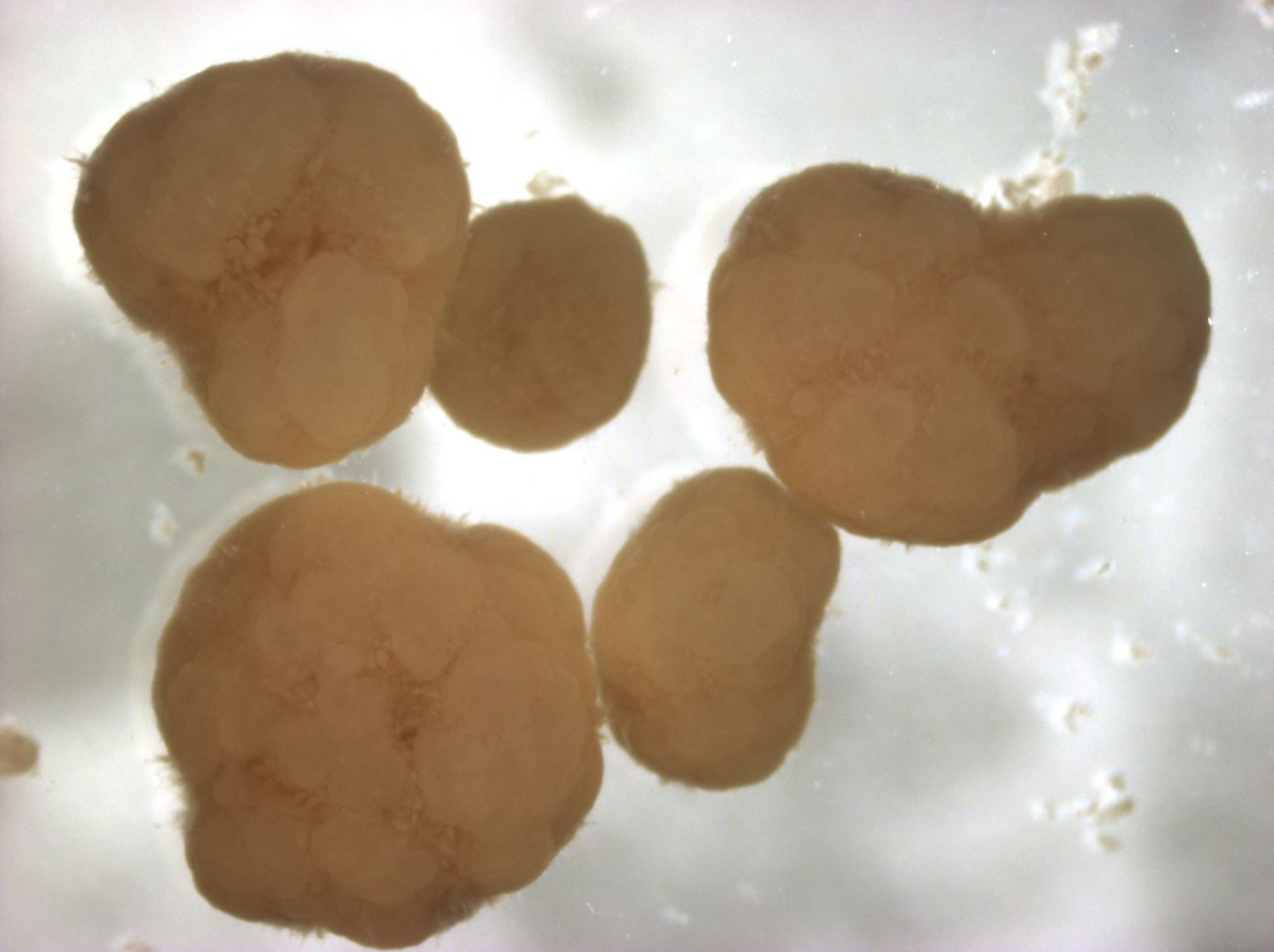
Aerobic Granules

== Context ==
Proponents of aerobic granular sludge technology claim "it will play an important role as an innovative technology alternative to the present activated sludge process in industrial and municipal wastewater treatment in the near future" and that it "can be readily established and profitably used in activated sludge plants". However, in 2011 it was characterised as "not yet established as a large-scale application ... with limited and unpublished full-scale applications for municipal wastewater treatment."

== Aerobic granular biomass ==
The following definition differentiates an aerobic granule from a simple floc with relatively good settling properties and came out of discussions which took place at the 1st IWA-Workshop Aerobic Granular Sludge in Munich (2004):

Granules making up aerobic granular activated sludge are to be understood as aggregates of microbial origin, which do not coagulate under reduced hydrodynamic shear, and which settle significantly faster than activated sludge flocs

— de Kreuk et al. 2005

== Formation of aerobic granules ==
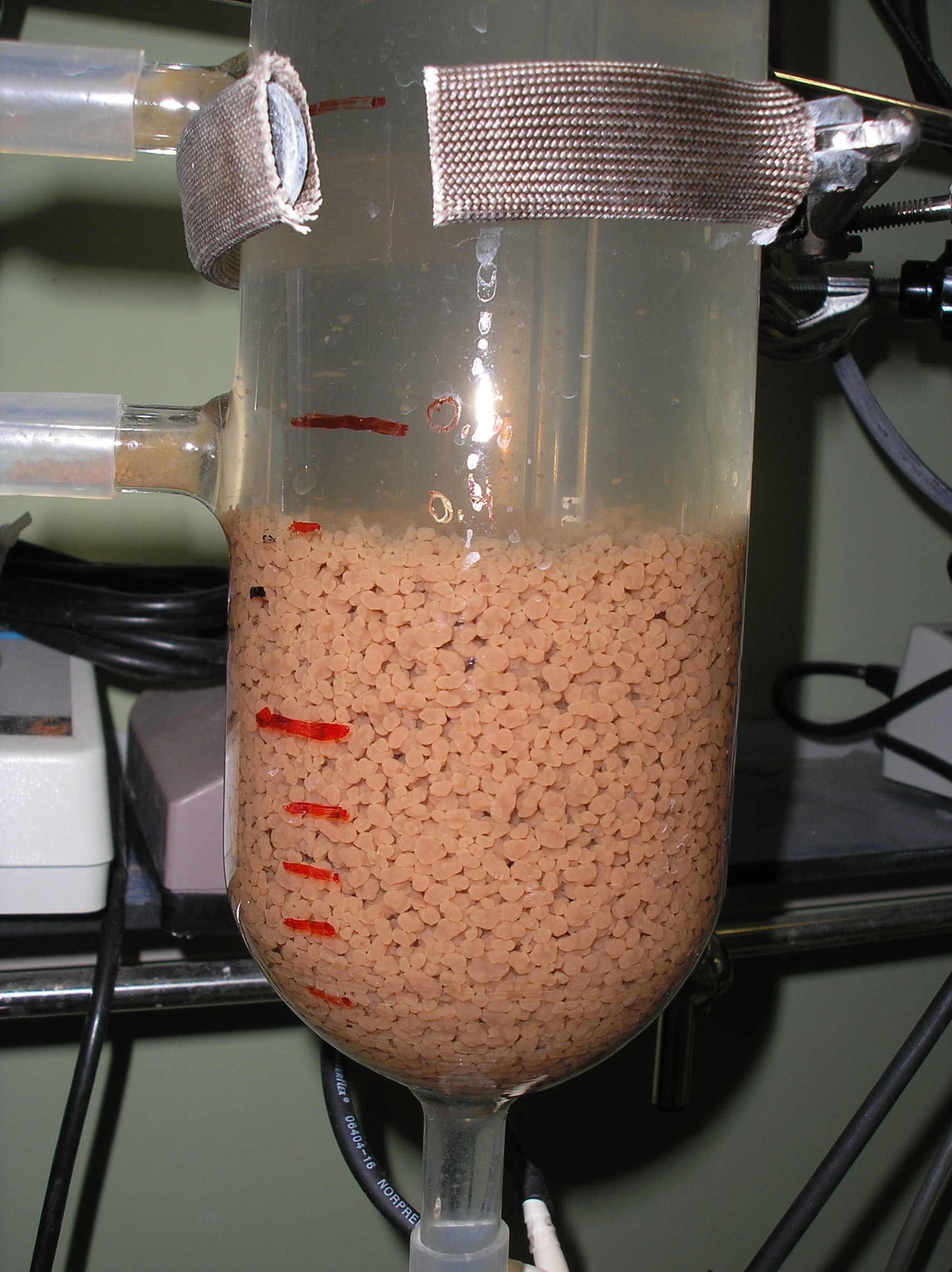
SBR Reactor, with aerobic granules

Granular sludge biomass is developed in sequencing batch reactors (SBR) and without carrier materials. These systems fulfil most of the requirements for their formation as:

Feast – Famine regime: short feeding periods must be selected to create feast and famine periods (Beun et al. 1999), characterized by the presence or absence of organic matter in the liquid media, respectively. With this feeding strategy the selection of the appropriate micro-organisms to form granules is achieved. When the substrate concentration in the bulk liquid is high, the granule-former organisms can store the organic matter in form of poly-β-hydroxybutyrate to be consumed in the famine period, giving an advantage over filamentous organisms. When an anaerobic feeding is applied this factor is enhanced, minimising the importance of short settling time and higher hydrodynamic forces.

Short settling time: This hydraulic selection pressure on the microbial community allows the retention granular biomass inside the reactor while flocculent biomass is washed-out. (Qin et al. 2004)

Hydrodynamic shear force : Evidences show that the application of high shear forces favours the formation of aerobic granules and the physical granule integrity. It was found that aerobic granules could be formed only above a threshold shear force value in terms of superficial upflow air velocity above 1.2 cm/s in a column SBR, and more regular, rounder, and more compact aerobic granules were developed at high hydrodynamic shear forces (Tay et al., 2001 ).

Granular activated sludge is also developed in flow-through reactors using the Hybrid Activated Sludge (HYBACS) process, comprising an attached-growth reactor with short retention time upstream of a suspended growth reactor. The attached bacteria in the first reactor, known as a SMART unit, are exposed to a constant high COD, triggering the expression of high concentrations of hydrolytic enzymes in the EPS layer around the bacteria. The accelerated hydrolysis liberates soluble readily-degradable COD which promotes the formation of granular activated sludge.

== Advantages ==
The development of biomass in the form of aerobic granules is being studied for its application in the removal of organic matter, nitrogen and phosphorus compounds from wastewater. Aerobic granules in an aerobic SBR present several advantages compared to conventional activated sludge process such as:

Stability and flexibility: the SBR system can be adapted to fluctuating conditions with the ability to withstand shock and toxic loadings

Low energy requirements: the aerobic granular sludge process has a higher aeration efficiency due to operation at increased height, while there are neither return sludge or nitrate recycle streams nor mixing and propulsion requirements

Reduced footprint: The increase in biomass concentration that is possible because of the high settling velocity of the aerobic sludge granules and the absence of a final settler result in a significant reduction in the required footprint.

Good biomass retention: higher biomass concentrations inside the reactor can be achieved, and higher substrate loading rates can be treated.

Presence of aerobic and anoxic zones inside the granules: to perform simultaneously different biological processes in the same system (Beun et al. 1999 )

Reduced investment and operational costs: the cost of running a wastewater treatment plant working with aerobic granular sludge can be reduced by at least 20% and space requirements can be reduced by as much as 75% (de Kreuk et al., 2004).

The HYBACS process has the additional benefit of being a flow-through process, thus avoiding the complexities of SBR systems. It is also readily applied to the upgrading of existing flow-through activated sludge processes, by installing the attached growth reactors upstream of the aeration tank. Upgrading to granular activated sludge process enables the capacity of an existing wastewater treatment plant to be doubled.

== Treatment of industrial wastewater ==
Synthetic wastewater was used in most of the works carried out with aerobic granules. These works were mainly focused on the study of granules formation, stability and nutrient removal efficiencies under different operational conditions and their potential use to remove toxic compounds. The potential of this technology to treat industrial wastewater is under study, some of the results:

- Arrojo et al. (2004) operated two reactors that were fed with industrial wastewater produced in a laboratory for analysis of dairy products (Total COD : 1500–3000 mg/L; soluble COD: 300–1500 mg/L; total nitrogen: 50–200 mg/L). These authors applied organic and nitrogen loading rates up to 7 g COD/(L·d) and 0.7 g N/(L·d) obtaining removal efficiencies of 80%.
- Schwarzenbeck et al. (2004) treated malting wastewater which had a high content of particulate organic matter (0.9 g TSS/L). They found that particles with average diameters lower than 25–50 μm were removed at 80% efficiency, whereas particles bigger than 50 μm were only removed at 40% efficiency. These authors observed that the ability of aerobic granular sludge to remove particulate organic matter from the wastewaters was due to both incorporation into the biofilm matrix and metabolic activity of protozoa population covering the surface of the granules.
- Cassidy and Belia (2005) obtained removal efficiencies for COD and P of 98% and for N and VSS over 97% operating a granular reactor fed with slaughterhouse wastewater (Total COD: 7685 mg/L; soluble COD: 5163 mg/L; TKN: 1057 mg/L and VSS: 1520 mg/L). To obtain these high removal percentages, they operated the reactor at a DO saturation level of 40%, which is the optimal value predicted by Beun et al. (2001) for N removal, and with an anaerobic feeding period which helped to maintain the stability of the granules when the DO concentration was limited.
- Inizan et al. (2005) treated industrial wastewaters from pharmaceutical industry and observed that the suspended solids in the inlet wastewater were not removed in the reactor.
- Tsuneda et al. (2006), when treating wastewater from metal-refinery process (1.0–1.5 g NH_{4}^{+}-N/L and up to 22 g/L of sodium sulphate), removed a nitrogen loading rate of 1.0 kg-N/m^{3}·d with an efficiency of 95% in a system containing autotrophic granules.
- Usmani et al. (2008) high superficial air velocity, a relatively short settling time of 5–30 min, a high ratio of height to diameter (H/D=20) of the reactor and optimum organic load facilitates the cultivation of regular compact and circular granules.
- Figueroa et al. (2008), treated wastewater from a fish canning industry. Applied OLR were up to 1.72 kg COD/(m^{3}·d) with fully organic matter depletion. Ammonia nitrogen was removed via nitrification-denitrification up to 40% when nitrogen loading rates were of 0.18 kg N/(m^{3}·d). The formation of mature aerobic granules occurred after 75 days of operation with 3.4 mm of diameter, SVI of 30 mL/g VSS and density around 60 g VSS/L-granule
- Farooqi et al. (2008), Wastewaters from fossil fuel refining, pharmaceuticals, and pesticides are the main sources of phenolic compounds. Those with more complex structures are often more toxic than the simple phenol. This study was aimed at assessing the efficacy of granular sludge in UASB and SBR for the treatment of mixtures of phenolics compounds. The results indicates that anaerobic treatment by UASB and aerobic treatment by SBR can be successfully used for phenol/cresol mixture, representative of major substrates in chemical and petrochemical wastewater and the results shows proper acclimatization period is essential for the degradation of m – cresol and phenol. Moreover, SBR was found as a better alternative than UASB reactor as it is more efficient and higher concentration of m cresols can be successfully degraded.
- López-Palau et al. (2009), treated wastewater from a winery industry. The formation of granules was performed using a synthetic substrate and after 120 days of operation, synthetic media was replaced by real winery wastewater, with a COD loading of 6 kg COD/(m^{3}·d).
- Dobbeleers "et al." (2017), treated wastewater from potato industry. Granulation was successful achieved and simultaneous nitrification/denitrification was possible by short cutting the nitrogen cycle.
- Caluwé "et al." (2017), Compared an aerobic feast/famine strategy and an anaerobic feast, aerobic famine strategy for the formation of aerobic granular sludge during the treatment of industrial petrochemical wastewater. Both strategies were successful.

== Pilot research in aerobic granular sludge ==
Aerobic granulation technology for the application in wastewater treatment is widely developed at laboratory scales. The large-scale experience is growing rapidly and multiple institutions are making efforts to improve this technology:

- Since 1999 Royal HaskoningDHV (former DHV Water), Delft University of technology (TUD), STW (Dutch Foundation for Applied Technology) and STOWA (Dutch Foundation for Applied Water Research) have been cooperating closely on the development of the aerobic granular sludge technology (Nereda). In September 2003, a first extensive pilot plant research was executed at STP Ede, the Netherlands with focus on obtaining stable granulation and biological nutrient removal. Following the positive outcome together with six Dutch Water Boards the parties decided to establish a Public-Private Partnership (PPP)- the National Nereda Research Program (NNOP)- to mature, further scale-up and implement several full-scale units. As part of this PPP extensive pilot tests have been executed between 2003 and 2010 at multiple sewage treatment plants. Currently more than 20 plants are running or under construction across 3 continents.
- From the basis of the aerobic granular sludge but using a contention system for the granules, a sequencing batch biofilter granular reactor (SBBGR) with a volume of 3.1m^{3} was developed by IRSA (Istituto di Ricerca Sulle Acque, Italy). Different studies were carried out in this plant treating sewage at an Italian wastewater treatment plant.
- The use of aerobic granules prepared in laboratory, as a starter culture, before adding in main system, is the base of the technology ARGUS (Aerobic granules upgrade system) developed by EcoEngineering Ltd.. The granules are cultivated on-site in small bioreactors called propagators and fill up only 2 to 3% of the main bioreactor or fermentor (digestor) capacity. This system is being used in a pilot plant with a volume of 2.7 m^{3} located in one Hungarian pharmaceutical industry.
- The Group of Environmental Engineering and Bioprocesses from the University of Santiago de Compostela is currently operating a 100 L pilot plant reactor.

The feasibility study showed that the aerobic granular sludge technology seems very promising (de Bruin et al., 2004. Based on total annual costs a GSBR (Granular sludge sequencing batch reactors) with pre-treatment and a GSBR with post-treatment proves to be more attractive than the reference activated sludge alternatives (6–16%). A sensitivity analysis shows that the GSBR technology is less sensitive to land price and more sensitive to rain water flow. Because of the high allowable volumetric load the footprint of the GSBR variants is only 25% compared to the references. However, the GSBR with only primary treatment cannot meet the present effluent standards for municipal wastewater, mainly because of exceeding the suspended solids effluent standard caused by washout of not well settleable biomass.

== Full scale application ==
Aerobic granulation technology is already successfully applied for treatment of wastewater.

- Since 2005, RoyalHaskoningDHV has implemented more than 100 full-scale aerobic granular sludge technology systems (Nereda) for the treatment of both industrial and municipal wastewater across 5 continents. One example is STP Epe, The Netherlands, with a capacity of 59.000 pe and 1,500 m3.h-1, being the first full-scale municipal Nereda in The Netherlands. Examples of the latest Nereda sewage treatment plants (2012–2013) include Wemmershoek- South Africa, Dinxperlo, Vroomshoop, Garmerwolde – The Netherlands.

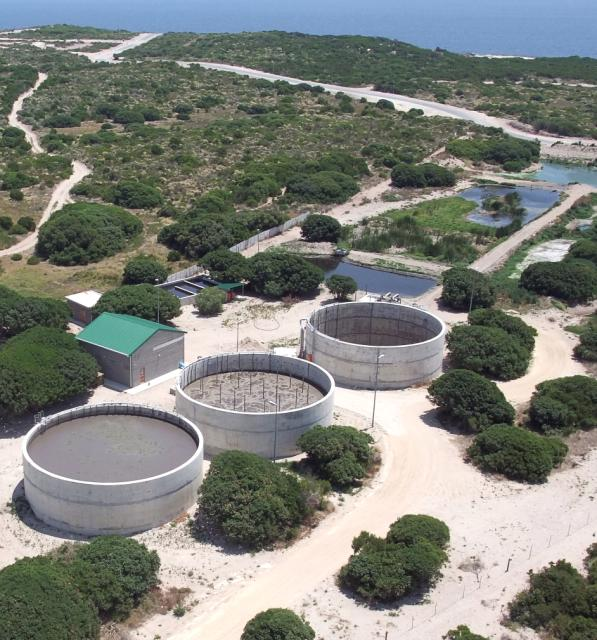
Full-scale municipal sewage Nereda application (4000 m3.d-1) at the Gansbaai STP in South Africa

Full-scale municipal sewage Nereda application Epe the Netherlands

Full-scale industrial sewage Nereda application Vika the Netherlands

- EcoEngineering applied aerobic granulation process in three pharmaceutical industries, Krka d.d. Novo mesto Slovenia, Lek d.d. Lendava, Slovenia and Gedeon Richter Rt. Dorog, Hungary. Wastewater treatment plants are already running more than five years.

== See also ==
- Agricultural wastewater treatment
- Effluent guidelines
- Industrial wastewater treatment
- List of waste water treatment technologies
- Sedimentation (water treatment)
- Water purification
- Sequencing batch reactor
