= Extended aeration =

Extended aeration is a method of sewage treatment using modified activated sludge procedures. It is preferred for relatively small waste loads, where lower operating efficiency is offset by mechanical simplicity.

== Conventional sewage treatment ==
Mechanized sewage treatment typically includes settling in a primary clarifier, followed by biological treatment and a secondary clarifier. Both clarifiers produce waste sludge requiring sewage sludge treatment and disposal. Activated sludge agitates a portion of the secondary clarifier sludge in the primary clarifier effluent. Remaining secondary sludge and all primary sludge typically require digestion prior to disposal.

== Process modification ==
Extended aeration agitates all incoming waste in the sludge from a single clarifier. The combined sludge starts with a higher concentration of inert solids than typical secondary sludge and the longer mixing time required for digestion of primary solids in addition to dissolved organics produces aged sludge requiring greater mixing energy input per unit of waste oxidized.

== Applications ==
Extended aeration is typically used in prefabricated "package plants" intended to minimize design costs for waste disposal from small communities, tourist facilities, or schools. In comparison to traditional activated sludge, longer mixing time with aged sludge offers a stable biological ecosystem better adapted for effectively treating waste load fluctuations from variable occupancy situations. Supplemental feeding with something like sugar is sometimes used to sustain sludge microbial populations during periods of low occupancy; but population response to variable food characteristics is unpredictable, and supplemental feeding increases waste sludge volumes. Sludge may be periodically removed by septic tank pumping trucks as sludge volume approaches storage capacity.

== See also ==
- List of waste-water treatment technologies
