= Activated sludge =

Wastewater treatment process using aeration and a biological floc

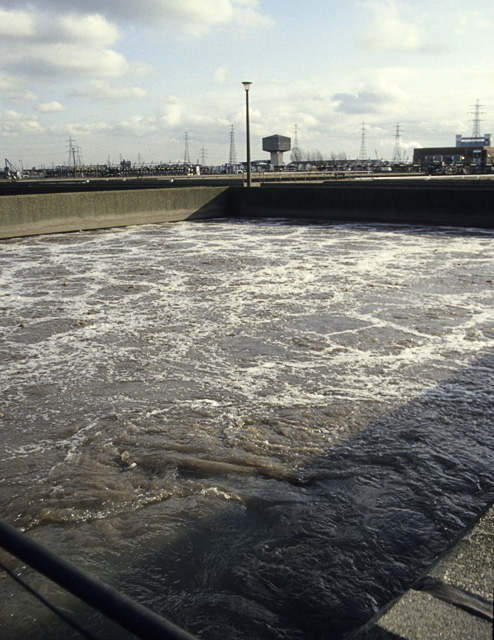
Activated sludge tank at Beckton sewage treatment plant, UK. The white bubbles are due to the diffused air aeration system.

The activated sludge process is a type of biological wastewater treatment process for treating sewage or industrial wastewaters using aeration and a biological floc composed of bacteria and protozoa. It is one of several biological wastewater treatment alternatives in secondary treatment, which deals with the removal of biodegradable organic matter and suspended solids. It uses air (or oxygen) and microorganisms to biologically oxidize organic pollutants, producing a waste sludge (or floc) containing the oxidized material.

The activated sludge process for removing carbonaceous pollution begins with an aeration tank where air (or oxygen) is injected into the waste water. This is followed by a settling tank to allow the biological flocs (the sludge blanket) to settle, thus separating the biological sludge from the clear treated water. Part of the waste sludge is recycled to the aeration tank and the remaining waste sludge is removed for further treatment and ultimate disposal.

Plant types include package plants, oxidation ditch, deep shaft/vertical treatment, surface-aerated basins, and sequencing batch reactors (SBRs). Aeration methods include diffused aeration, surface aerators (cones) or, rarely, pure oxygen aeration.

Sludge bulking can occur which makes activated sludge difficult to settle and frequently has an adverse impact on final effluent quality. Treating sludge bulking and managing the plant to avoid a recurrence requires skilled management and may require full-time staffing of a works to allow immediate intervention. A new development of the activated sludge process is the Nereda process which produces a granular sludge that settles very well.

== Purpose ==
A generalized, schematic diagram of an activated sludge process.

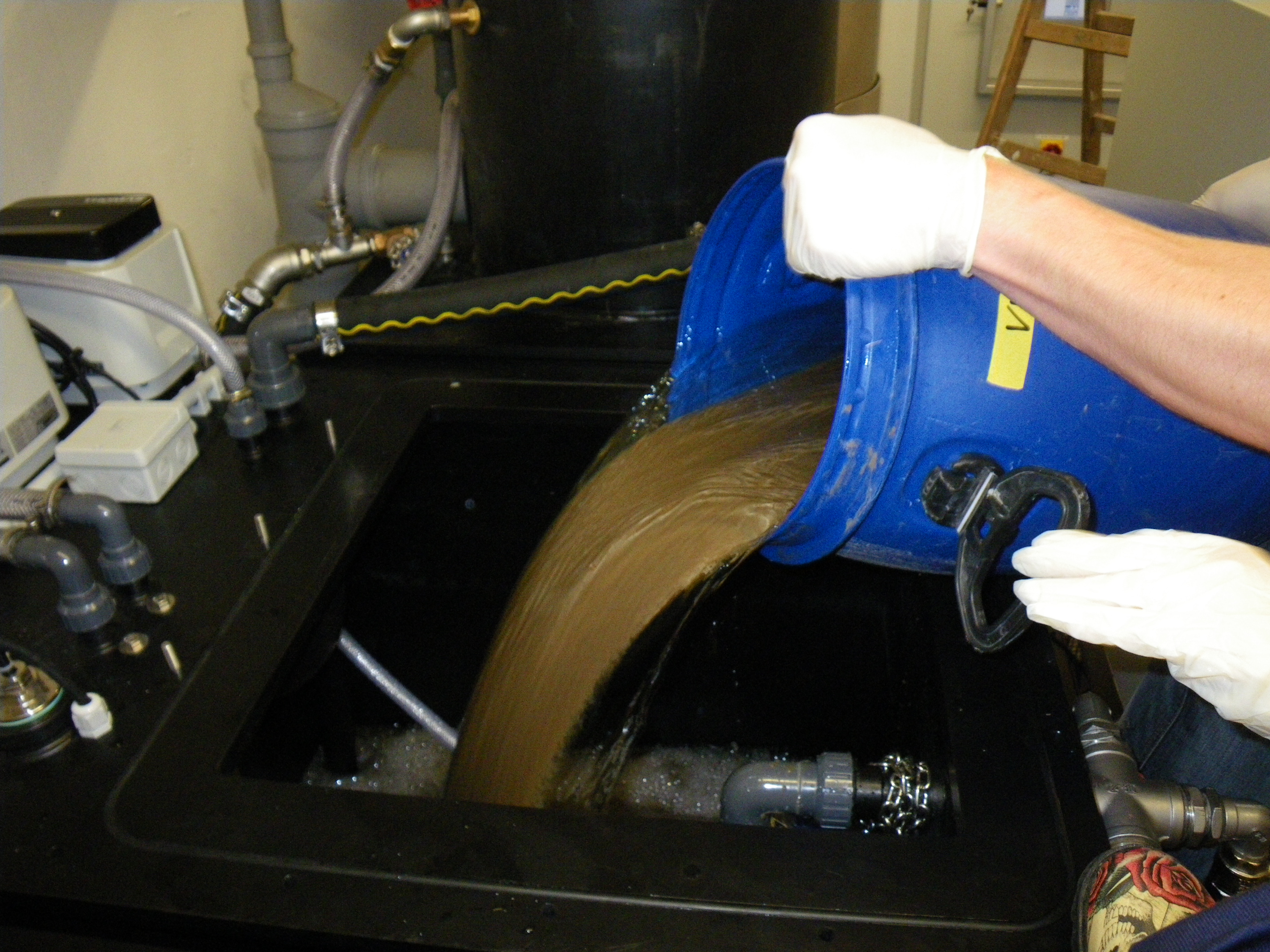
Activated sludge addition (seeding) to a pilot scale membrane bioreactor in Germany

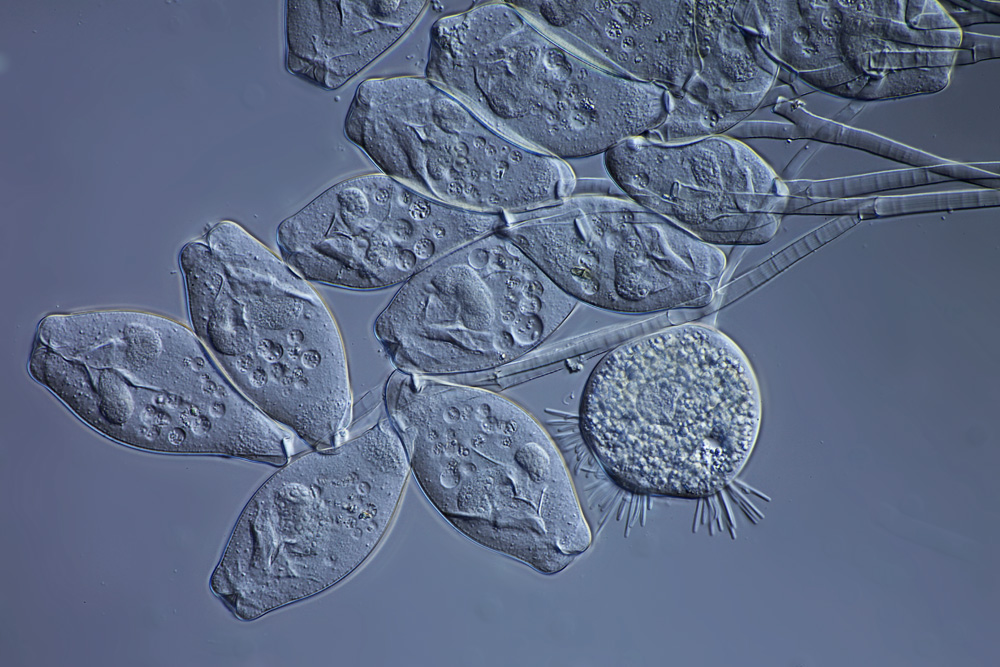
Activated sludge under the microscope

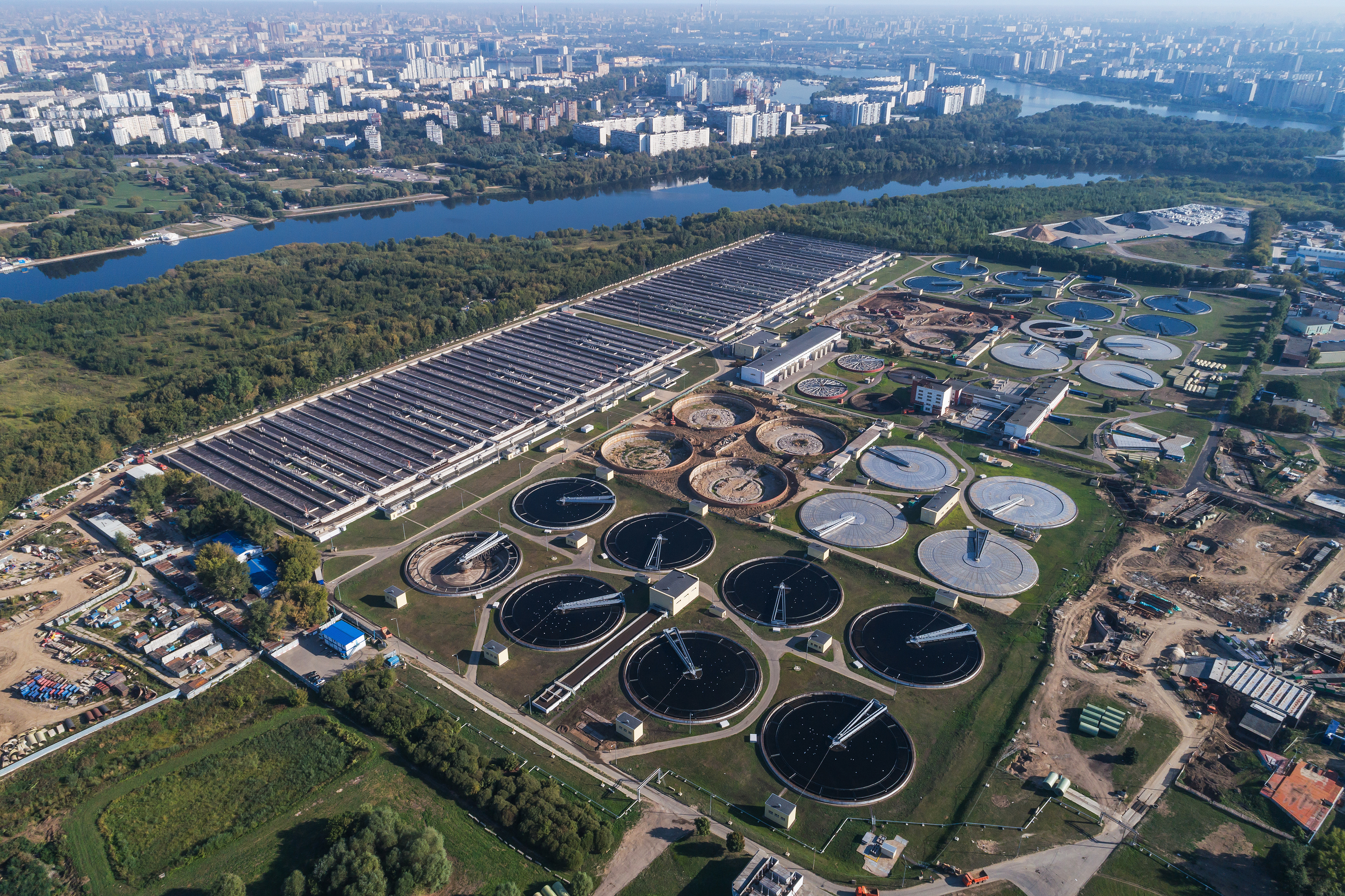
Aerial photo of Kuryanovo wastewater treatment plant in Moscow, Russia

The activated sludge process is a biological process used to oxidise carbonaceous biological matter, oxidising nitrogenous matter (mainly ammonium and nitrogen) in biological matter, and removing nutrients (nitrogen and phosphorus).

== Process description ==
The process takes advantage of aerobic micro-organisms that can digest organic matter in sewage, and clump together by flocculation entrapping fine particulate matter as they do so. It thereby produces a liquid that is relatively free from suspended solids and organic material, and flocculated particles that will readily settle out and can be removed.

The general arrangement of an activated sludge process for removing carbonaceous pollution includes the following items:

- Aeration tank where air (or oxygen) is injected in the mixed liquor.
- Settling tank (usually referred to as "final clarifier" or "secondary settling tank") to allow the biological flocs (the sludge blanket) to settle, thus separating the biological sludge from the clear treated water.

=== Nitrification-denitrification ===
Treatment of nitrogenous or phosphorous matter comprises the addition of an anoxic compartment inside the aeration tank in order to perform the nitrification-denitrification process more efficiently. First, ammonia is oxidized to nitrite, which is then converted into nitrate in aerobic conditions (aeration compartment). Facultative bacteria then reduce the nitrate to nitrogen gas in anoxic conditions (anoxic compartment). Moreover, the organisms used for the phosphorus uptake (polyphosphate accumulating organisms, PAOs) are more efficient under anoxic conditions. These microorganisms accumulate large amounts of phosphates in their cells and are settled in the secondary clarifier. The settled sludge is either disposed of as waste activated sludge or reused in the aeration tank as return activated sludge. Some sludge must always be returned to the aeration tanks to maintain an adequate population of organisms.

The yield of PAOs is reduced between 70 and 80% under aerobic conditions. Even though the phosphorus can be removed upstream of the aeration tank by chemical precipitation (adding metal ions such as calcium, aluminum or iron), the biological phosphorus removal is more economic due to the saving of chemicals.

=== Bioreactor and final clarifier ===
The process involves air or oxygen being introduced into a mixture of screened, and primary treated sewage or industrial wastewater (wastewater) combined with organisms to develop a biological floc which reduces the organic content of the sewage. This material, which in healthy sludge is a brown floc, is largely composed of Saprotrophic bacteria but also has an important protozoan flora component mainly composed of amoebae, Spirotrichs, Peritrichs including Vorticellids and a range of other filter-feeding species. Other important constituents include motile and sedentary Rotifers. In poorly managed activated sludge, a range of mucilaginous filamentous bacteria can develop - including Sphaerotilus natans, Gordonia, and other microorganisms - which produces a sludge that is difficult to settle and can result in the sludge blanket decanting over the weirs in the settlement tank to severely contaminate the final effluent quality. This material is often described as sewage fungus but true fungal communities are relatively uncommon.

The combination of wastewater and biological mass is commonly known as mixed liquor. In all activated sludge plants, once the wastewater has received sufficient treatment, excess mixed liquor is discharged into settling tanks and the treated supernatant is run off to undergo further treatment before discharge. Part of the settled material, the sludge, is returned to the head of the aeration system to re-seed the new wastewater entering the tank. This fraction of the floc is called return activated sludge (R.A.S.).

The space required for a sewage treatment plant can be reduced by using a membrane bioreactor to remove some wastewater from the mixed liquor prior to treatment. This results in a more concentrated waste product that can then be treated using the activated sludge process.

Many sewage treatment plants use axial flow pumps to transfer nitrified mixed liquor from the aeration zone to the anoxic zone for denitrification. These pumps are often referred to as internal mixed liquor recycle pumps (IMLR pumps). The raw sewage, the RAS, and the nitrified mixed liquor are mixed by submersible mixers in the anoxic zones in order to achieve denitrification.

=== Sludge production ===
Activated sludge is also the name given to the active biological material produced by activated sludge plants. Excess sludge is called "surplus activated sludge" or "waste activated sludge" and is removed from the treatment process to keep "food to biomass" (F/M) ratio in balance (where biomass refers to the activated sludge). This sewage sludge is usually mixed with primary sludge from the primary clarifiers and undergoes further sludge treatment for example by anaerobic digestion, followed by thickening, dewatering, composting and land application.

The amount of sewage sludge produced from the activated sludge process is directly proportional to the amount of wastewater treated. The total sludge production consists of the sum of primary sludge from the primary sedimentation tanks as well as waste activated sludge from the bioreactors. The activated sludge process produces about 70–100 grams per cubic metre (1.9–2.7 oz/cu yd) of waste activated sludge (that is grams of dry solids produced per cubic metre of wastewater treated). 80 grams per cubic metre (2.2 oz/cu yd) is regarded as being typical. In addition, about 110–170 grams per cubic metre (3.0–4.6 oz/cu yd) of primary sludge is produced in the primary sedimentation tanks which most - but not all - of the activated sludge process configurations use.

=== Process control ===
The general process control method is to monitor sludge blanket level, SVI (Sludge Volume Index), MCRT (Mean Cell Residence Time), F/M (Food to Microorganism), as well as the biota of the activated sludge and the major nutrients DO (Dissolved oxygen), nitrogen, phosphate, BOD (Biochemical oxygen demand), and COD (Chemical oxygen demand). In the reactor/aerator and clarifier system, the sludge blanket is measured from the bottom of the clarifier to the level of settled solids in the clarifier's water column; this, in large plants, can be done up to three times a day.

The SVI is the volume of settled sludge occupied by a given mass of dry sludge solids. It is calculated by dividing the volume of settled sludge in a mixed liquor sample, measured in milliliters per liter of sample (after 30 minutes of settling), by the MLSS (Mixed Liquor Suspended Solids), measured in grams per liter. The MCRT is the total mass (in kilograms or pounds) of mixed liquor suspended solids in the aerator and clarifier divided by the mass flow rate (in kilograms/pounds per day) of mixed liquor suspended solids leaving as WAS and final effluent. The F/M is the ratio of food fed to the microorganisms each day to the mass of microorganisms held under aeration. Specifically, it is the amount of BOD fed to the aerator (in kilograms/pounds per day) divided by the amount (in kilograms or pounds) of Mixed Liquor Volatile Suspended Solids (MLVSS) under aeration. Note: Some references use MLSS (Mixed Liquor Suspended Solids) for expedience, but MLVSS is considered more accurate for the measure of microorganisms. Again, due to expedience, COD is generally used, in lieu of BOD, as BOD takes five days for results.

To ensure good bacterial settlement and to avoid sedimentation problems caused by filamentous bacteria, plants using atmospheric air as an oxygen source should maintain a dissolved oxygen (DO) level of about 2 mg/L in the aeration tank. In pure oxygen systems, DO levels are usually in the range of 4 to 10 mg/L. Operators should monitor the tank for low DO bacteria, such as S. natans, type 1701 and H. hydrossis, which indicate low DO conditions by elevated effluent turbidity and dark activated sludge with foul odours. Many plants have on-line monitoring equipment that continuously measures and records DO levels at specific points within the aeration tank. These on-line analysers send data to the SCADA system and allow automatic control of the aeration system to maintain a predetermined DO level. Whether generated automatically or taken manually, regular monitoring is necessary to favour organisms that settle well rather than filaments. However, operating the aeration system involves finding a balance between sufficient oxygen for proper treatment and the energy cost, which represents approximately 90% of the total treatment cost.

Based on these control methods, the amount of settled solids in the mixed liquor can be varied by wasting activated sludge (WAS) or returning activated sludge (RAS). The returning activated sludge is designed to recycle a portion of the activated sludge from the secondary clarifier back to the aeration tank. It usually includes a pump that draws the portion back. The RAS line is designed considering the potential for clogging, settling, and other relatable issues that manage to impact the flow of the activated sludge back to the aeration tank. This line must handle the required flow of the plant and has to be designed to minimize the risk of solids settling or accumulating.

=== Nitrification and denitrification ===
Ammonium can have a toxic effect on aquatic organisms. Nitrification also takes place in bodies of water, which leads to oxygen depletion. Furthermore, nitrate and ammonium are eutrophying (fertilizing) nutrients that can impair water bodies. For these reasons, nitrification and, in many cases, nitrogen removal is necessary.

Two special steps are required for nitrogen removal:

a) Nitrification: Oxidation of ammonium nitrogen and organically bound nitrogen to nitrate. Nitrification is very sensitive to inhibitors and can lead to a pH value in poorly buffered water.

Nitrification takes places in following steps:

1. $\mathrm {\ NH_4^+ + 1.5 \ O_2 \longrightarrow \ NO_2^- + 2 H^+ + H_2O + Energy}$
2. $\mathrm {\ NO_2^- + 0.5 \ O_2 \longrightarrow \ NO_3^- + Energy}$

this results in:

$\mathrm {\ NH_4^+ + 2 \ O_2 \longrightarrow \ NO_3^- + 2H^+ + H_2O + Energy}$

Nitrification is associated with the production of acid (H+). This puts a strain on the buffering capacity of the water or a pH value shift may occur, which impairs the process.

b) Denitrification: Reduction of nitrate nitrogen to molecular nitrogen, which escapes from the wastewater into the atmosphere. This step can be carried out by microorganisms commonly found in sewage treatment plants. However, these only use the nitrate as an electron acceptor if no dissolved oxygen is present.

$\mathrm {\ 2 \ NO_3^- + 2 \ H^+ + 10 \ H \longrightarrow \ N_2 + 6 \ H_2O}$

In order for denitrification to take place in the activated sludge process, an electron source, a reductant, must therefore also be present that can reduce sufficient nitrate to N_{2}. If there is too little substrate in the raw wastewater, this can be added artificially. In addition, denitrification corrects the change in H+ concentration (pH value shift) that occurs during nitrification. This is particularly important for poorly buffered water.

Nitrification and denitrification are in considerable contradiction with regard to the required environmental conditions. Nitrification requires oxygen and CO_{2}. Denitrification only takes place in the absence of dissolved oxygen and with a sufficient supply of oxidizable substances.

== Plant types ==
There are a variety of types of activated sludge plants. These include:

=== Package plants ===
There are a wide range of types of package plants, often serving small communities or industrial plants that may use hybrid treatment processes often involving the use of aerobic sludge to treat the incoming sewage. In such plants the primary settlement stage of treatment may be omitted. In these plants, a biotic floc is created which provides the required substrate. Package plants are designed and fabricated by specialty engineering firms in dimensions that allow for their transportation to the job site in public highways, typically width and height of 3.7 by 3.7 metres (12 ft × 12 ft). Length varies with capacity with larger plants being fabricated in pieces and welded on site. Steel is preferred over synthetic materials (e.g., plastic) for its durability. Package plants are commonly variants of extended aeration, to promote the "fit and forget" approach required for small communities without dedicated operational staff. There are various standards to assist with their design.

To use less space, treat difficult waste, and intermittent flows, a number of designs of hybrid treatment plants have been produced. Such plants often combine at least two stages of the three main treatment stages into one combined stage. In the UK, where a large number of wastewater treatment plants serve small populations, package plants are a viable alternative to building a large structure for each process stage. In the US, package plants are typically used in rural areas, highway rest stops and trailer parks.

Package plants may be referred to as high charged or low charged. This refers to the way the biological load is processed. In high charged systems, the biological stage is presented with a high organic load and the combined floc and organic material is then oxygenated for a few hours before being charged again with a new load. In the low charged system the biological stage contains a low organic load and is combined with flocculate for longer times.

=== Oxidation ditch ===
In some areas, where more land is available, sewage is treated in large round or oval ditches with one or more horizontal aerators typically called brush or disc aerators which drive the mixed liquor around the ditch and provide aeration. These are oxidation ditches, often referred to by manufacturer's trade names such as Pasveer, Orbal, or Carrousel. They have the advantage that they are relatively easy to maintain and are resilient to shock loads that often occur in smaller communities (i.e. at breakfast time and in the evening).

Oxidation ditches are installed commonly as 'fit & forget' technology, with typical design parameters of a hydraulic retention time of 24 – 48 hours, and a sludge age of 12 – 20 days. This compares with nitrifying activated sludge plants having a retention time of 8 hours, and a sludge age of 8 – 12 days.

=== DeepShaft / vertical treatment ===
Where land is in short supply, sewage may be treated by injection of oxygen into a pressured return sludge stream which is injected into the base of a deep columnar tank buried in the ground. Such shafts may be up to 100 metres (330 ft) deep and are filled with sewage liquor. As the sewage rises the oxygen forced into solution by the pressure at the base of the shaft breaks out as molecular oxygen providing a highly efficient source of oxygen for the activated sludge biota. The rising oxygen and injected return sludge provide the physical mechanism for mixing of the sewage and sludge. Mixed sludge and sewage is decanted at the surface and separated into supernatant and sludge components. The efficiency of deep shaft treatment can be high.

Surface aerators are commonly quoted as having an aeration efficiency of 0.5–1.5 kg O_{2}/kWh (1.1–3.3 lb O_{2}/kWh), diffused aeration as 1.5–2.5 kg O_{2}/kWh (3.3–5.5 lb O_{2}/kWh). Deep Shaft claims 5–8 kg O_{2}/kWh (11–18 lb O_{2}/kWh).

However, the costs of construction are high. DeepShaft has seen the greatest uptake in Japan, because of the land area issues. DeepShaft was developed by ICI, as a spin-off from their Pruteen process. In the UK it is found at three sites: Tilbury, Anglian Water, treating a wastewater with a high industrial contribution; Southport, United Utilities, because of land space issues; and Billingham, ICI, again treating industrial effluent, and built (after the Tilbury shafts) by ICI to help the agent sell more.

DeepShaft is a patented and licensed process. The licensee has changed several times; as of 2015, it is owned by Noram Engineering.

=== Surface-aerated basins ===
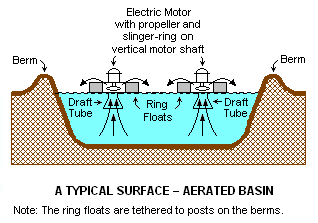
A Typical Surface-Aerated Basing (using motor-driven floating aerators)

Most biological oxidation processes for treating industrial wastewaters have in common the use of oxygen (or air) and microbial action. Surface-aerated basins achieve 80 to 90% removal of BOD with retention times of 1 to 10 days. The basins may range in depth from 1.5 to 5.0 metres (4.9 to 16.4 ft) and utilize motor-driven aerators floating on the surface of the wastewater.

In an aerated basin system, the aerators provide two functions: they transfer air into the basins required by the biological oxidation reactions, and they provide the mixing required for dispersing the air and for contacting the reactants (that is, oxygen, wastewater and microbes). Typically, the floating surface aerators are rated to deliver the amount of air equivalent to 1.8 to 2.7 kilograms O_{2}/kWh (4.0 to 6.0 lb O_{2}/kWh). However, they do not provide as good mixing as is normally achieved in activated sludge systems and therefore aerated basins do not achieve the same performance level as activated sludge units.

Biological oxidation processes are sensitive to temperature and, between 0 and 40 °C (32 and 104 °F), the rate of biological reactions increase with temperature. Most surface aerated vessels operate at between 4 and 32 °C (39 and 90 °F).

=== Sequencing batch reactors (SBRs) ===
Sequencing batch reactors (SBRs) treat wastewater in batches within the same vessel. This means that the bioreactor and final clarifier are not separated in space but in a timed sequence. The installation consists of at least two identically equipped tanks with a common inlet, which can be alternated between them. While one tank is in settle/decant mode the other is aerating and filling.

== Aeration methods ==
=== Diffused aeration ===
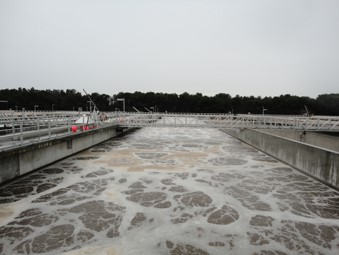
Fine bubble diffusers in aeration tank of activated sludge sewage treatment plant near Adelaide, Australia

Sewage liquor is run into deep tanks with diffuser grid aeration systems that are attached to the floor. These are like the diffused airstone used in tropical fish tanks but on a much larger scale. Air is pumped through the blocks and the curtain of bubbles formed both oxygenates the liquor and also provides the necessary mixing action. Where capacity is limited or the sewage is unusually strong or difficult to treat, oxygen may be used instead of air. Typically, the air is generated by some type of air blower.

=== Surface aerators (cones) ===
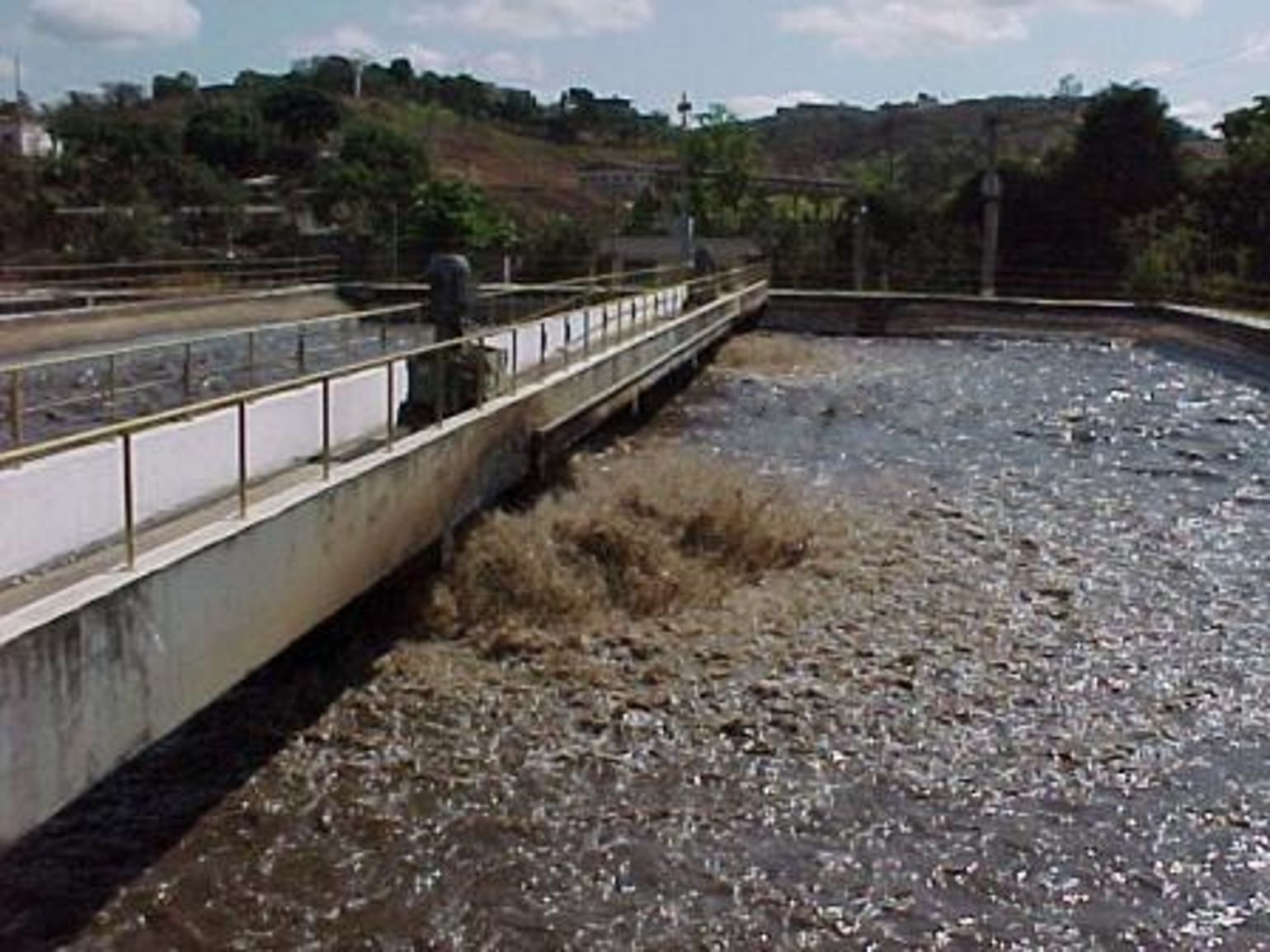
Surface aerator for aeration tank at activated sludge sewage treatment plant (at Morro Alto Treatment Plant, Vespasiano, Brazil)

Vertically mounted tubes of up to 1-metre (3.3 ft) diameter extending from just above the base of a deep concrete tank to just below the surface of the sewage liquor. A typical shaft might be 10 metres (33 ft) high. At the surface end, the tube is formed into a cone with helical vanes attached to the inner surface. When the tube is rotated, the vanes spin liquor up and out of the cones drawing new sewage liquor from the base of the tank. In many works, each cone is located in a separate cell that can be isolated from the remaining cells if required for maintenance. Some works may have two cones to a cell and some large works may have 4 cones per cell.

=== Pure oxygen aeration ===
Pure oxygen activated sludge aeration systems are sealed-tank reactor vessels with surface aerator type impellers mounted within the tanks at the oxygen carbon liquor surface interface. The amount of oxygen entrainment, or DO (Dissolved Oxygen), can be controlled by a weir adjusted level control, and a vent gas oxygen controlled oxygen feed valve. Oxygen is generated on site by cryogenic distillation of air, pressure swing adsorption, or other methods. These systems are used where wastewater plant space is at a premium and high sewage throughput is required as high energy costs are involved in purifying oxygen.

== Recent developments ==
A new development of the activated sludge process is the Nereda process which produces a granular sludge that settles very well (the sludge volume index is reduced from 200–300 to 40 millilitres per gram (192–288 to 38 US fl oz/oz)). A new process reactor system is created to take advantage of this quick settling sludge and is integrated into the aeration tank instead of having a separate unit outside. As of 2015, about 30 Nereda wastewater treatment plants worldwide were operational, under construction or under design, varying in size from 5,000 up to 858,000 person equivalent.

== Issues ==
=== Process upsets ===
Sludge bulking can occur which makes activated sludge difficult to settle and frequently has an adverse impact on final effluent quality. Treating sludge bulking and managing the plant to avoid a recurrence requires skilled management and may require full-time staffing of a works to allow immediate intervention.

The discharge of toxic industrial pollution to treatment plants designed primarily to treat domestic sewage can create process upsets.

=== Costs and technology choice ===
The activated sludge process is an example for a more high-tech, energy intensive or "mechanized" process that is relatively expensive compared to some other wastewater treatment systems. It can provide a very high level of treatment.

Activated sludge plants are wholly dependent on an electrical supply to power the aerators to transfer settled solids back to the aeration tank inlet, and in many cases to pump waste sludge and final effluent. In some works untreated sewage is lifted by pumps to the head-works to provide sufficient fall through the works to enable a satisfactory discharge head for the final effluent. Alternative technologies such as trickling filter treatment requires much less power and can operate on gravity alone.

== History ==
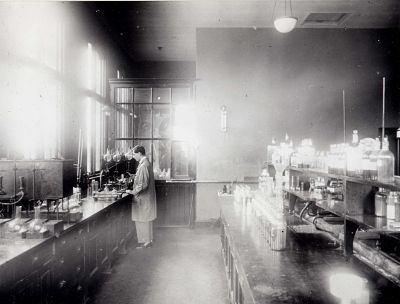
The Davyhulme Sewage Works Laboratory, where the activated sludge process was developed in the early 20th century

The activated sludge process was discovered in 1913 in the United Kingdom by two engineers, Edward Ardern and W.T. Lockett, who were conducting research for the Manchester Corporation Rivers Department at Davyhulme Sewage Works. In 1912, Gilbert Fowler, a scientist at the University of Manchester, observed experiments being conducted at the Lawrence Experiment Station at Massachusetts involving the aeration of sewage in a bottle that had been coated with algae. Fowler's engineering colleagues, Ardern and Lockett, experimented on treating sewage in a draw-and-fill reactor, which produced a highly treated effluent. They aerated the waste-water continuously for about a month and were able to achieve a complete nitrification of the sample material. Believing that the sludge had been activated (in a similar manner to activated carbon) the process was named activated sludge. Not until much later was it realized that what had actually occurred was a means to concentrate biological organisms, decoupling the liquid retention time (ideally, low, for a compact treatment system) from the solids retention time (ideally, fairly high, for an effluent low in BOD_{5} and ammonia.)

Their results were published in their seminal 1914 paper, and the first full-scale continuous-flow system was installed at Worcester two years later. In the aftermath of the First World War the new treatment method spread rapidly, especially to the US, Denmark, Germany and Canada. By the late 1930s, the activated sludge treatment became a well-known biological wastewater treatment process in those countries where sewer systems and sewage treatment plants were common.

== See also ==
- Activated sludge model
- Aerated lagoon
- Aerobic granulation
- Aerobic granular reactor
- Aerobic treatment system
- Industrial wastewater treatment
- List of wastewater treatment technologies
- Membrane bioreactor
- Rotating biological contactor
- Sludge bulking
- Thermal hydrolysis
