= Sequencing batch reactor =

Type of activated sludge process for the treatment of wastewater

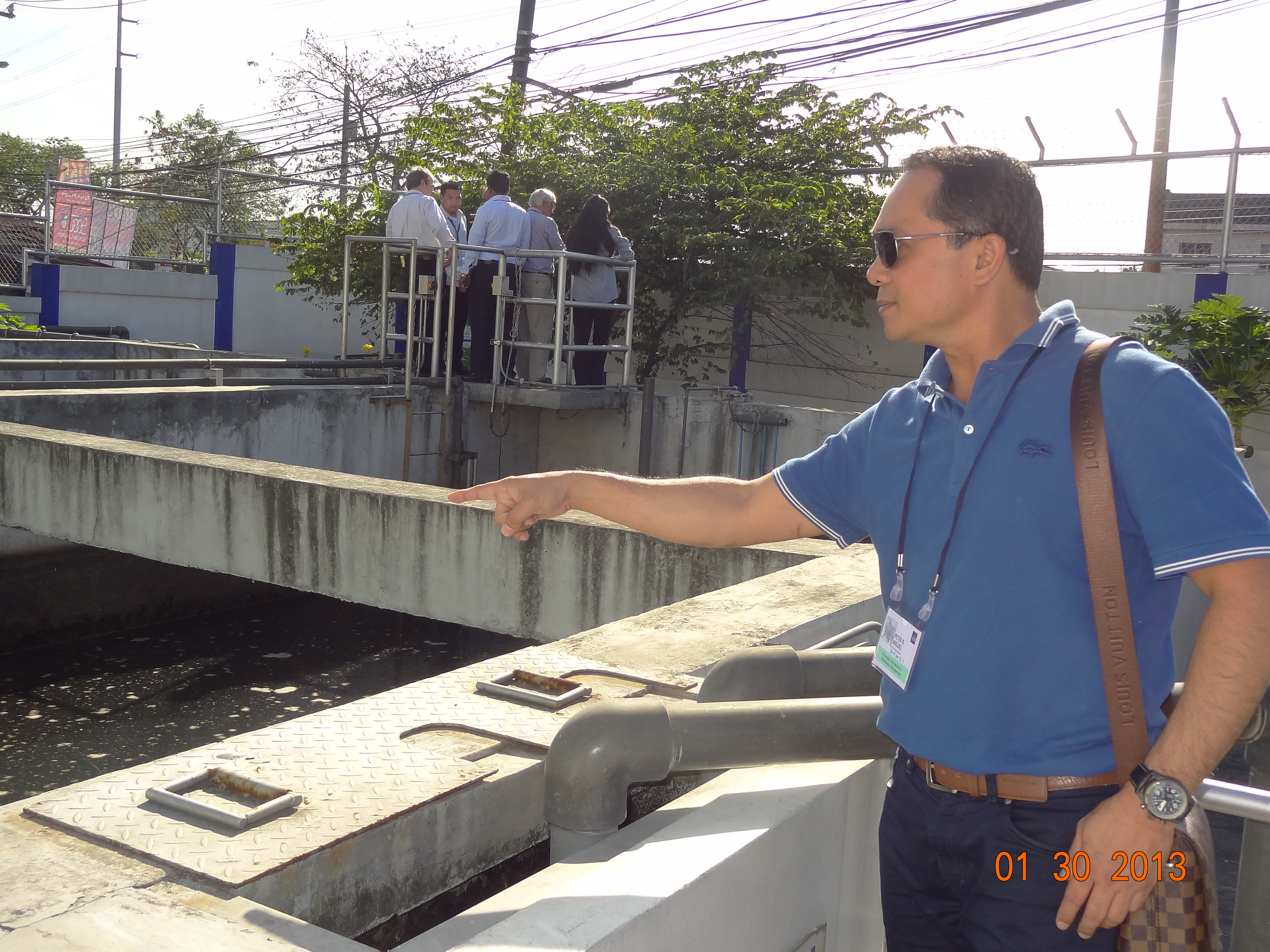
An SBR in the Philippines.

Sequencing batch reactors (SBR) or sequential batch reactors are a type of activated sludge process for the treatment of wastewater. SBRs treat wastewater such as sewage or output from anaerobic digesters or mechanical biological treatment facilities in batches. Oxygen is bubbled through the mixture of wastewater and activated sludge to reduce the organic matter (measured as biochemical oxygen demand (BOD) and chemical oxygen demand (COD)). The treated effluent may be suitable for discharge to surface waters or possibly for use on land.

== Overview ==
The phases in the operation of an SBR.

While there are several configurations of SBRs, the basic process is similar. The installation consists of one or more tanks that can be operated as plug flow or completely mixed reactors. The tanks have a “flow through” system, with raw wastewater (influent) coming in at one end and treated water (effluent) flowing out the other. In systems with multiple tanks, while one tank is in settle/decant mode the other is aerating and filling. In some systems, tanks contain a section known as the bio-selector, which consists of a series of walls or baffles which direct the flow either from side to side of the tank or under and over consecutive baffles. This helps to mix the incoming influent and the returned activated sludge (RAS), beginning the biological digestion process before the liquor enters the main part of the tank.

== Treatment stages ==
There are five stages in the treatment process:

1. Fill
2. React
3. Settle
4. Decant
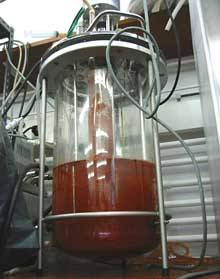
5. An anammox SBR.
  Idle

First, the inlet valve is opened and the tank is filled, while mixing is provided by mechanical means, but no air is added yet. This stage is also called the anoxic stage. During the second stage, aeration of the mixed liquor is performed by the use of fixed or floating mechanical pumps or by transferring air into fine bubble diffusers fixed to the floor of the tank. No aeration or mixing is provided in the third stage and the settling of suspended solids starts. During the fourth stage the outlet valve opens and the "clean" supernatant liquor exits the tank.

== Removal of constituents ==
Aeration times vary according to the plant size and the composition/quantity of the incoming liquor, but are typically 60 to 90 minutes. The addition of oxygen to the liquor encourages the multiplication of aerobic bacteria and they consume the nutrients. This process encourages the conversion of nitrogen from its reduced ammonia form to oxidized nitrite and nitrate forms, a process known as nitrification.

An SBR in Bunbury.

To remove phosphorus compounds from the liquor, aluminium sulfate (alum) is often added during this period. It reacts to form non-soluble compounds, which settle into the sludge in the next stage.

The settling stage is usually the same length in time as the aeration. During this stage the sludge formed by the bacteria is allowed to settle to the bottom of the tank. The aerobic bacteria continue to multiply until the dissolved oxygen is all but used up. Conditions in the tank, especially near the bottom are now more suitable for the anaerobic bacteria to flourish. Many of these, and some of the bacteria which would prefer an oxygen environment, now start to use oxidized nitrogen instead of oxygen gas (as an alternate terminal electron acceptor) and convert the nitrogen to a gaseous state, as nitrogen oxides or, ideally, molecular nitrogen (dinitrogen, N_{2}) gas. This is known as denitrification.

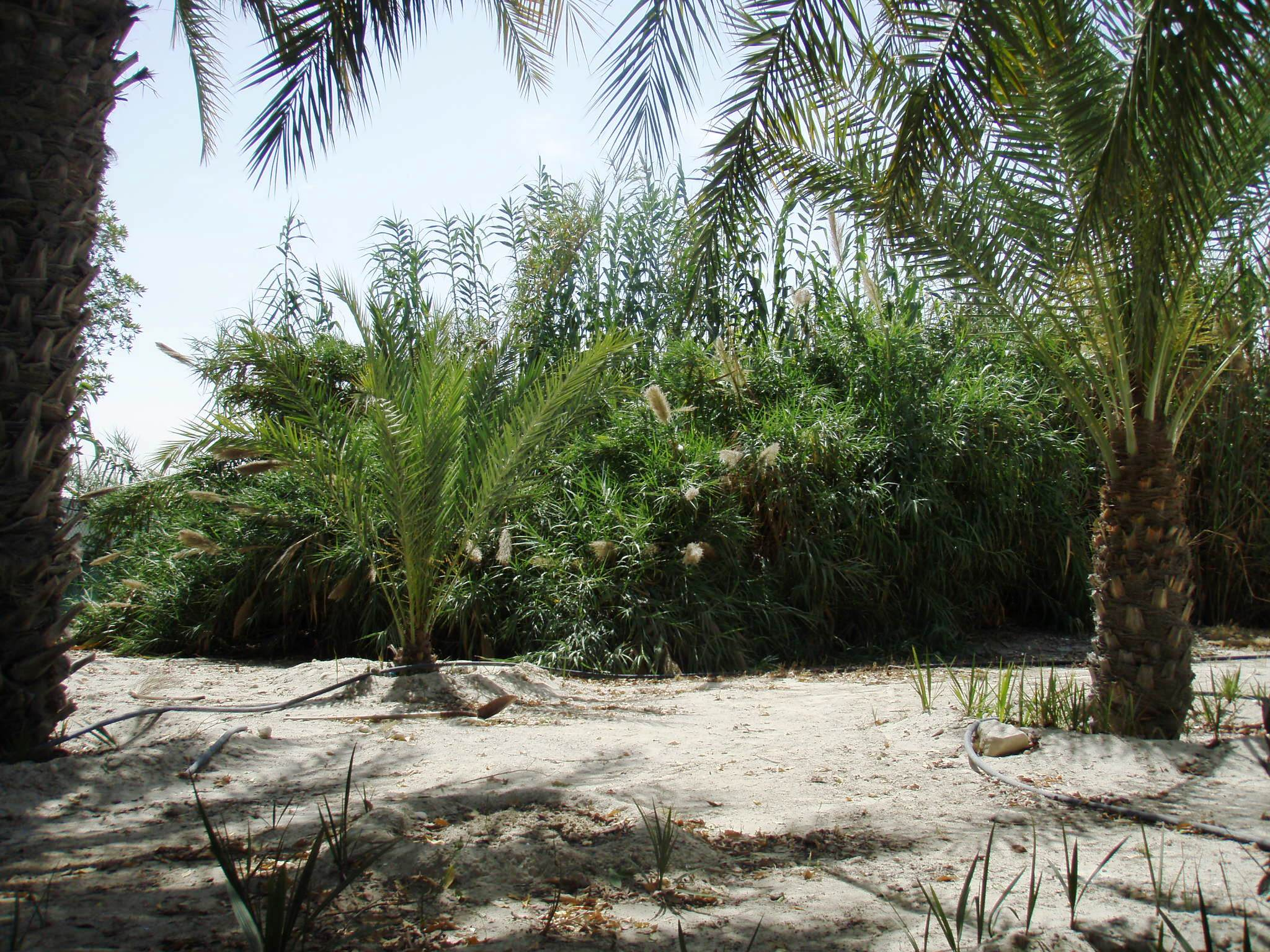
Tree plantations may be irrigated with the final SBR effluent.

An anoxic SBR can be used for anaerobic processes, such as the removal of ammonia via Anammox, or the study of slow-growing microorganisms. In this case, the reactors are purged of oxygen by flushing with inert gas and there is no aeration.

As the bacteria multiply and die, the sludge within the tank increases over time and a waste activated sludge (WAS) pump removes some of the sludge during the settling stage to a digester for further treatment. The quantity or “age” of sludge within the tank is closely monitored, as this can have a marked effect on the treatment process.

The sludge is allowed to settle until clear water is on the top 20 to 30 percent of the tank contents.

The decanting stage most commonly involves the slow lowering of a scoop or “trough” into the basin. This has a piped connection to a lagoon where the final effluent is stored for disposal to a wetland, tree plantation, ocean outfall, or to be further treated for use on parks, golf courses etc.

== Conversion ==
In some situations in which a traditional treatment plant cannot fulfill required treatment (due to higher loading rates, stringent treatment requirements, etc.), the owner might opt to convert their traditional system into a multi-SBR plant. Conversion to SBR will create a longer sludge age, minimizing sludge handling requirements downstream of the SBR.

The reverse can also be done, in which SBR Systems would be converted into extended aeration (EA) systems. SBR treatment systems that cannot cope up with a sudden constant increase of influent may easily be converted into EA plants. Extended aeration plants are more flexible in flow rate, eliminating restrictions presented by pumps located throughout the SBR systems. Clarifiers can be retrofitted in the equalization tanks of the SBR.

== See also ==
- Aerobic granulation
- Diffuser (sewage)
- List of waste-water treatment technologies
- Upflow anaerobic sludge blanket digestion
