= Sewage sludge treatment =

Processes to manage and dispose of sludge during sewage treatment

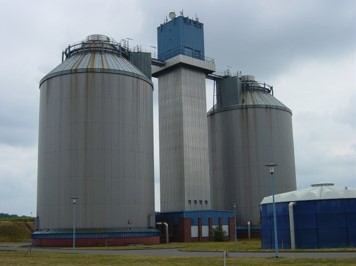
Sludge treatment in anaerobic digesters at a sewage treatment plant in Cottbus, Germany

Sewage sludge treatment describes the processes used to manage and dispose of sewage sludge produced during sewage treatment. Sludge treatment is focused on reducing sludge weight and volume to reduce transportation and disposal costs, and on reducing potential health risks of disposal options. Water removal is the primary means of weight and volume reduction, while pathogen destruction is frequently accomplished through heating during thermophilic digestion, composting, or incineration. The choice of a sludge treatment method depends on the volume of sludge generated, and comparison of treatment costs required for available disposal options. Air-drying and composting may be attractive to rural communities, while limited land availability may make aerobic digestion and mechanical dewatering preferable for cities, and economies of scale may encourage energy recovery alternatives in metropolitan areas.

Sludge is mostly water with some amounts of solid material removed from liquid sewage. Primary sludge includes settleable solids removed during primary treatment in primary clarifiers. Secondary sludge is sludge separated in secondary clarifiers that are used in secondary treatment bioreactors or processes using inorganic oxidizing agents. In intensive sewage treatment processes, the sludge produced needs to be removed from the liquid line on a continuous basis because the volumes of the tanks in the liquid line have insufficient volume to store sludge. This is done in order to keep the treatment processes compact and in balance (production of sludge approximately equal to the removal of sludge). The sludge removed from the liquid line goes to the sludge treatment line. Aerobic processes (such as the activated sludge process) tend to produce more sludge compared with anaerobic processes. On the other hand, in extensive (natural) treatment processes, such as ponds and constructed wetlands, the produced sludge remains accumulated in the treatment units (liquid line) and is only removed after several years of operation.

Sludge treatment options depend on the amount of solids generated and other site-specific conditions. Composting is most often applied to small-scale plants with aerobic digestion for mid-sized operations, and anaerobic digestion for the larger-scale operations. The sludge is sometimes passed through a so-called pre-thickener which de-waters the sludge. Types of pre-thickeners include centrifugal sludge thickeners, rotary drum sludge thickeners and belt filter presses. Dewatered sludge may be incinerated or transported offsite for disposal in a landfill or use as an agricultural soil amendment.

Energy may be recovered from sludge through methane gas production during anaerobic digestion or through incineration of dried sludge, but energy yield is often insufficient to evaporate sludge water content or to power blowers, pumps, or centrifuges required for dewatering. Coarse primary solids and secondary sewage sludge may include toxic chemicals removed from liquid sewage by sorption onto solid particles in clarifier sludge. Reducing sludge volume may increase the concentration of some of these toxic chemicals in the sludge.

== Terminology ==
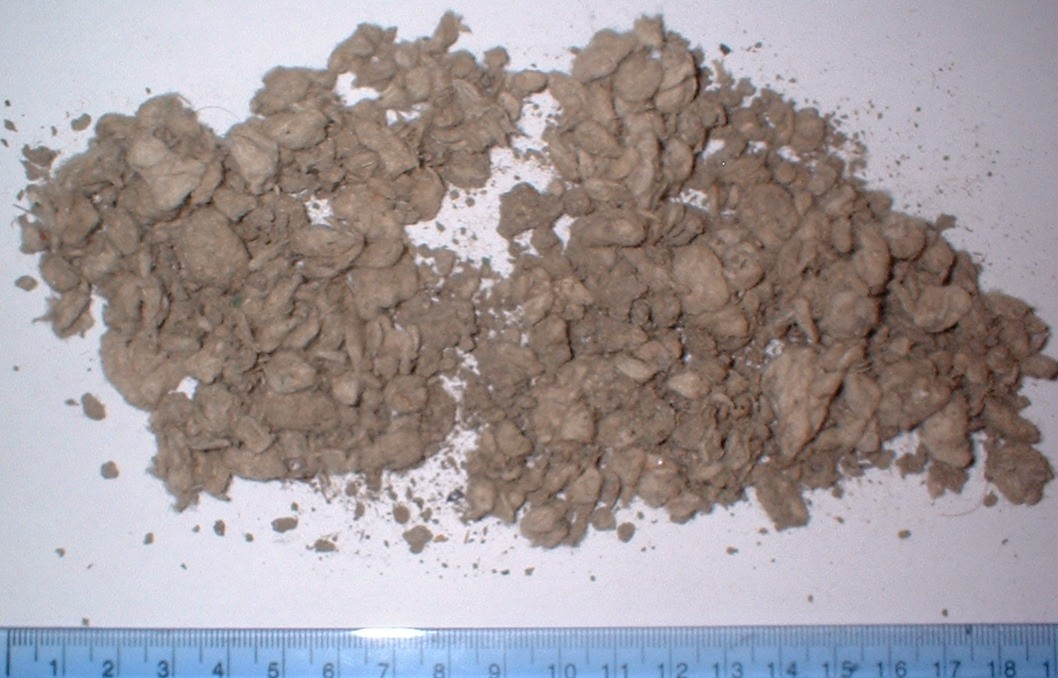
Dried, anaerobically digested sludge.

=== Biosolids ===
"Biosolids" is a term often used in wastewater engineering publications and public relations efforts by local water authorities when they want to put the focus on reuse of sewage sludge, after the sludge has undergone suitable treatment processes. In fact, biosolids are defined as organic wastewater solids that can be reused after stabilization processes such as anaerobic digestion and composting. The term "biosolids" was introduced by the Water Environment Federation in the U.S. in 1998. However, some people argue that the term is a euphemism to hide the fact that sewage sludge may also contain substances that could be harmful to the environment when the treated sludge is applied to land, for example environmental persistent pharmaceutical pollutants and heavy metal compounds.

== Treatment processes ==
The sludges accumulated in a wastewater treatment process must be treated and disposed of in a safe and effective manner. In many large plants the raw sludges are reduced in volume by a process of digestion.

=== Thickening ===
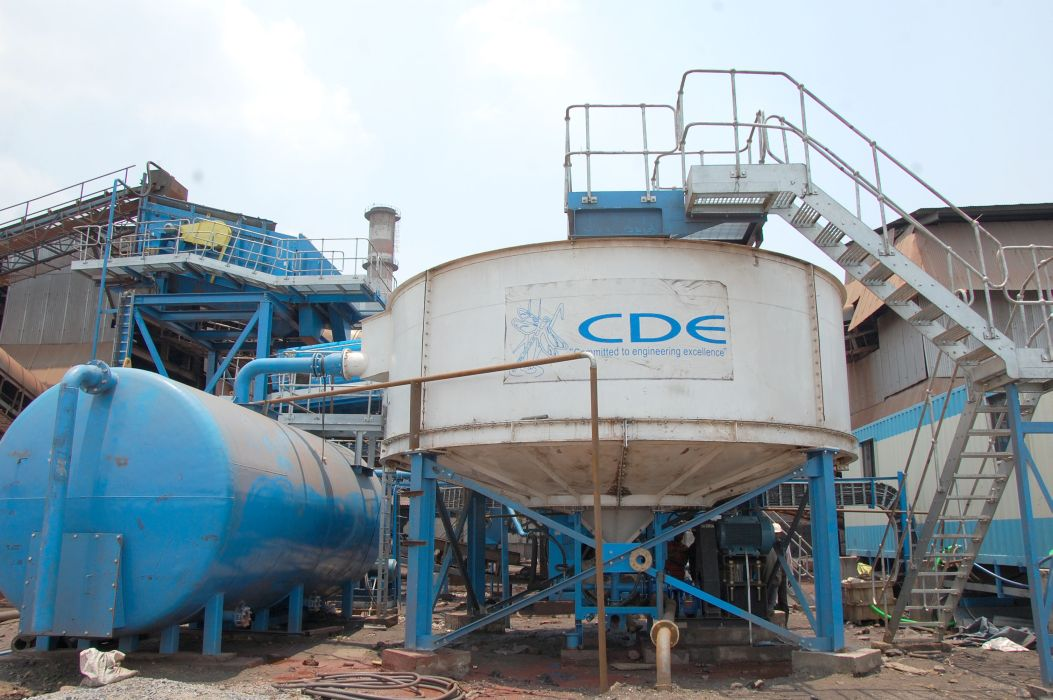
A sewage sludge thickener.

Thickening is often the first step in a sludge treatment process. Sludge from primary or secondary clarifiers may be stirred (often after addition of clarifying agents) to form larger, more rapidly settling aggregates. Primary sludge may be thickened to about 8 or 10 percent solids, while secondary sludge may be thickened to about 4 percent solids. Thickeners often resemble a clarifier with the addition of a stirring mechanism. Thickened sludge with less than ten percent solids may receive additional sludge treatment while liquid thickener overflow is returned to the sewage treatment process.

=== Dewatering ===
Schematic of a belt filter press to dewater sewage sludge. Filtrate is extracted initially by gravity, then by squeezing the cloth through rollers.

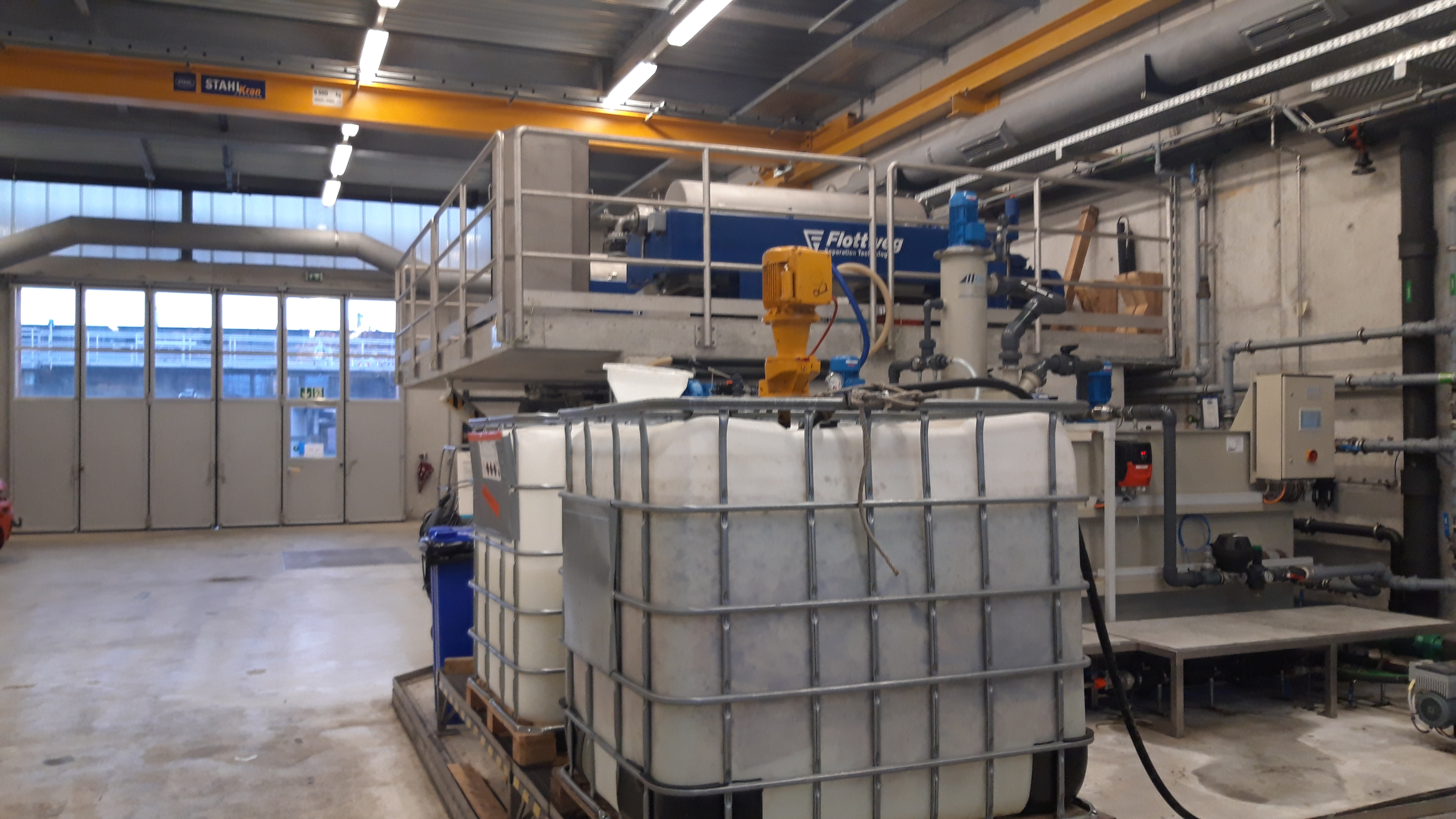
Sludge treatment in the sewage treatment plant of Birsfelden, Germany.

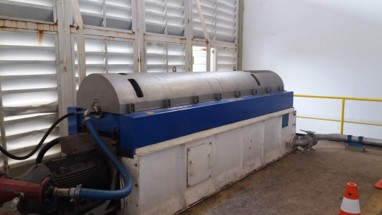
Mechanical dewatering (centrifuge) at a large sewage treatment plant (Arrudas Treatment Plant, Belo Horizonte, Brazil).

Water content of sludge may be reduced by centrifugation, filtration, and/or evaporation to reduce transportation costs of disposal, or to improve suitability for composting. Centrifugation may be a preliminary step to reduce sludge volume for subsequent filtration or evaporation. Filtration may occur through underdrains in a sand drying bed or as a separate mechanical process in a belt filter press. Filtrate and centrate are typically returned to the sewage treatment process. After dewatering sludge may be handled as a solid containing 50 to 75 percent water. Dewatered sludges with higher moisture content are usually handled as liquids.

=== Digestion ===
Many sludges are treated using a variety of digestion techniques, the purpose of which is to reduce the amount of organic matter and the number of disease-causing microorganisms present in the solids. The most common treatment options include anaerobic digestion, aerobic digestion, and composting. Sludge digestion offers significant cost advantages by reducing sludge quantity by nearly 50% and providing biogas as a valuable energy source.

The purpose of digestion is to reduce the amount of organic matter and the number of disease-causing microorganisms present in the solids. The process is often optimized to generate methane gas which can be used as a fuel to provide energy to power the plant or for sale.

==== Anaerobic digestion ====
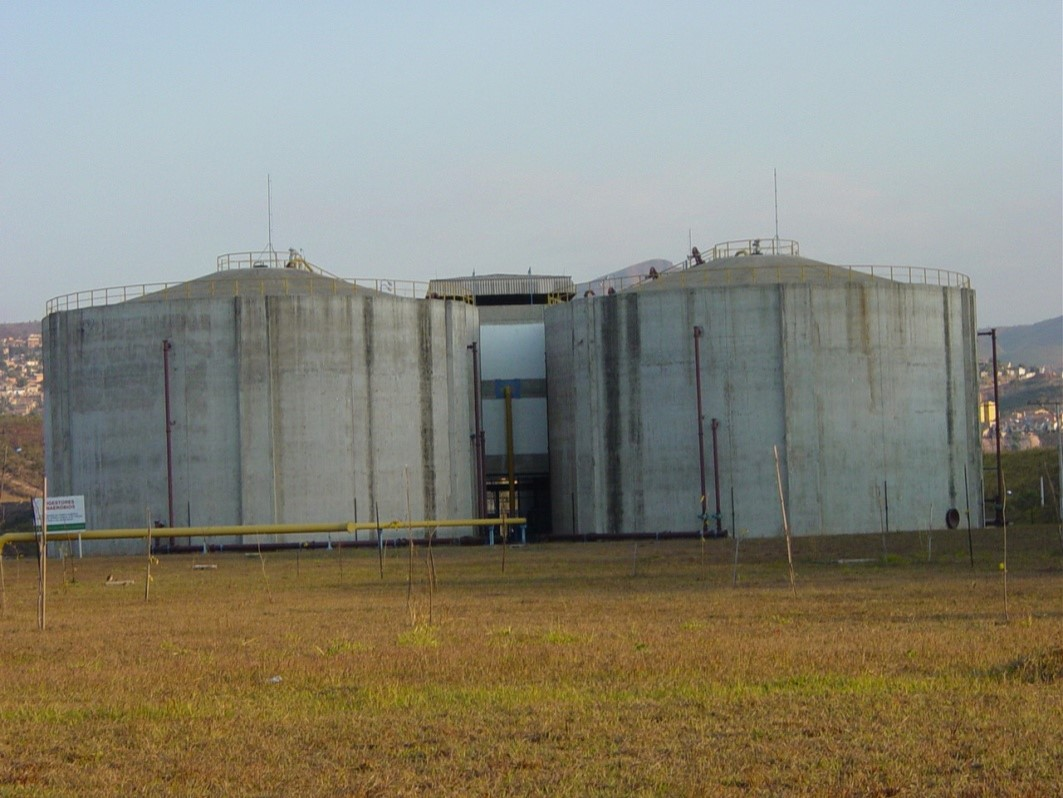
Anaerobic digesters for sewage sludge treatment at Arrudas Treatment Plant, Belo Horizonte, Brazil.

Anaerobic digestion is a bacterial process that is carried out in the absence of oxygen. The process can either be thermophilic digestion, in which sludge is fermented in tanks at a temperature of 55 °C, or mesophilic, at a temperature of around 36 °C. Though allowing shorter retention time (and thus smaller tanks), thermophilic digestion is more expensive in terms of energy consumption for heating the sludge.

Mesophilic anaerobic digestion (MAD) is also a common method for treating sludge produced at sewage treatment plants. The sludge is fed into large tanks and held for a minimum of 12 days to allow the digestion process to perform the four stages necessary to digest the sludge. These are hydrolysis, acidogenesis, acetogenesis, and methanogenesis. In this process the complex proteins and sugars are broken down to form more simple compounds such as water, carbon dioxide, and methane.

Anaerobic digestion generates biogas with a high proportion of methane that may be used to both heat the tank and run engines or microturbines for other on-site processes. Methane generation is a key advantage of the anaerobic process. Its key disadvantage is the long time required for the process (up to 30 days) and the high capital cost. Many larger sites utilize the biogas for combined heat and power, using the cooling water from the generators to maintain the temperature of the digestion plant at the required 35 ± 3 °C. Sufficient energy can be generated in this way to produce more electricity than the machines require.

The Sludge Treatment Facility ("T-PARK") is able to provide electricity for its own operation and even to the Hong Kong public power grid by making use of the heat generated during the process of the sludge incineration.

==== Aerobic digestion ====
Aerobic digestion is a bacterial process occurring in the presence of oxygen resembling a continuation of the activated sludge process. Under aerobic conditions, bacteria rapidly consume organic matter and convert it into carbon dioxide. Once there is a lack of organic matter, bacteria die and are used as food by other bacteria. This stage of the process is known as endogenous respiration. Solids reduction occurs in this phase. Because the aerobic digestion occurs much faster than anaerobic digestion, the capital costs of aerobic digestion are lower. However, the operating costs are characteristically much greater for aerobic digestion because of energy used by the blowers, pumps and motors needed to add oxygen to the process. However, recent technological advances include non-electric aerated filter systems that use natural air currents for the aeration instead of electrically operated machinery.

Aerobic digestion can also be achieved by using diffuser systems or jet aerators to oxidize the sludge. Fine bubble diffusers are typically the more cost-efficient diffusion method, however, plugging is typically a problem due to sediment settling into the smaller air holes. Coarse bubble diffusers are more commonly used in activated sludge tanks or in the flocculation stages. A key component for selecting diffuser type is to ensure it will produce the required oxygen transfer rate.

=== Sidestream treatment technologies ===
Sludge treatment technologies that are used for thickening or dewatering of sludge have two products: the thickened or dewatered sludge, and a liquid fraction which is called sludge treatment liquids, sludge dewatering streams, liquors, centrate (if it stems from a centrifuge), filtrate (if it stems from a belt filter press) or similar. This liquid requires further treatment as it is high in nitrogen and phosphorus, particularly if the sludge has been anaerobically digested. The treatment can take place in the sewage treatment plant itself (by recycling the liquid to the start of the treatment process) or as a separate process.

==== Phosphorus recovery ====
One method for treating sludge dewatering streams is by using a process that is also used for phosphorus recovery. Another benefit for sewage treatment plant operators of treating sludge dewatering streams for phosphorus recovery is that it reduces the formation of obstructive struvite scale in pipes, pumps and valves. Such obstructions can be a maintenance headache particularly for biological nutrient removal plants where the phosphorus content in the sewage sludge is elevated. For example, the Canadian company Ostara Nutrient Recovery Technologies is marketing a process based on controlled chemical precipitation of phosphorus in a fluidized bed reactor that recovers struvite in the form of crystalline pellets from sludge dewatering streams. The resulting crystalline product is sold to the agriculture, turf and ornamental plants sectors as fertilizer under the registered trade name "Crystal Green".

=== Composting ===
Composting is an aerobic process of mixing sewage sludge with agricultural byproduct sources of carbon such as sawdust, straw or wood chips. In the presence of oxygen, bacteria digesting both the sewage sludge and the plant material generate heat to kill disease-causing microorganisms and parasites. Maintenance of aerobic conditions with 10 to 15 percent oxygen requires bulking agents allowing air to circulate through the fine sludge solids. Stiff materials like corn cobs, nut shells, shredded tree-pruning waste, or bark from lumber or paper mills better separate sludge for ventilation than softer leaves and lawn clippings. Light, biologically inert bulking agents like shredded tires may be used to provide structure where small, soft plant materials are the major source of carbon.

Uniform distribution of pathogen-killing temperatures may be aided by placing an insulating blanket of previously composted sludge over aerated composting piles. Initial moisture content of the composting mixture should be about 50 percent; but temperatures may be inadequate for pathogen reduction where wet sludge or precipitation raises compost moisture content above 60 percent. Composting mixtures may be piled on concrete pads with built-in air ducts to be covered by a layer of unmixed bulking agents. Odors may be minimized by using an aerating blower drawing vacuum through the composting pile via the underlying ducts and exhausting through a filtering pile of previously composted sludge to be replaced when moisture content reaches 70 percent. Liquid accumulating in the underdrain ducting may be returned to the sewage treatment plant; and composting pads may be roofed to provide better moisture content control.

After a composting interval sufficient for pathogen reduction, composted piles may be screened to recover undigested bulking agents for re-use; and composted solids passing through the screen may be used as a soil amendment material with similar benefits to peat. The optimum initial carbon-to-nitrogen ratio of a composting mixture is between 26-30:1; but the composting ratio of agricultural byproducts may be determined by the amount required to dilute concentrations of toxic chemicals in the sludge to acceptable levels for the intended compost use. Although toxicity is low in most agricultural byproducts, suburban grass clippings may have residual herbicide levels detrimental to some agricultural uses; and freshly composted wood byproducts may contain phytotoxins inhibiting germination of seedlings until detoxified by soil fungi.

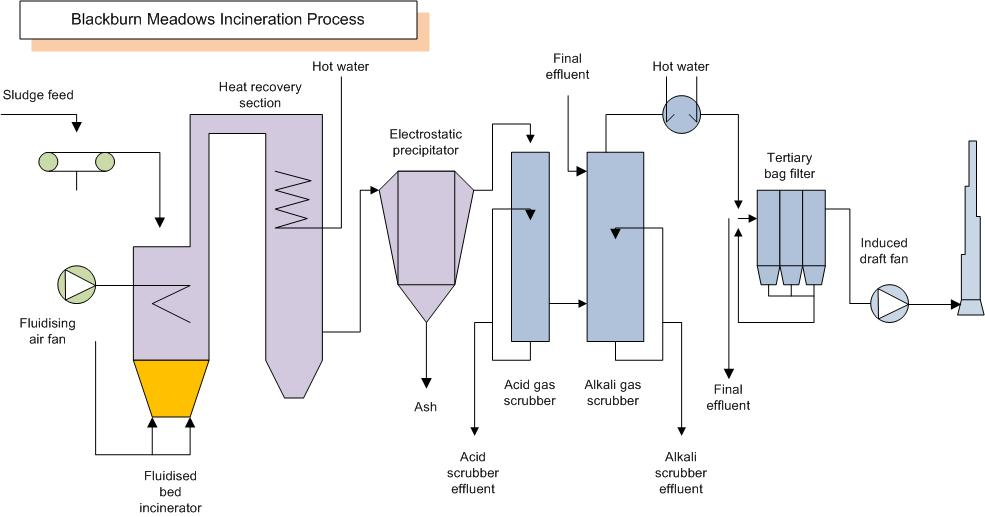
Sludge incineration process schematic (note the emphasis on air quality control).

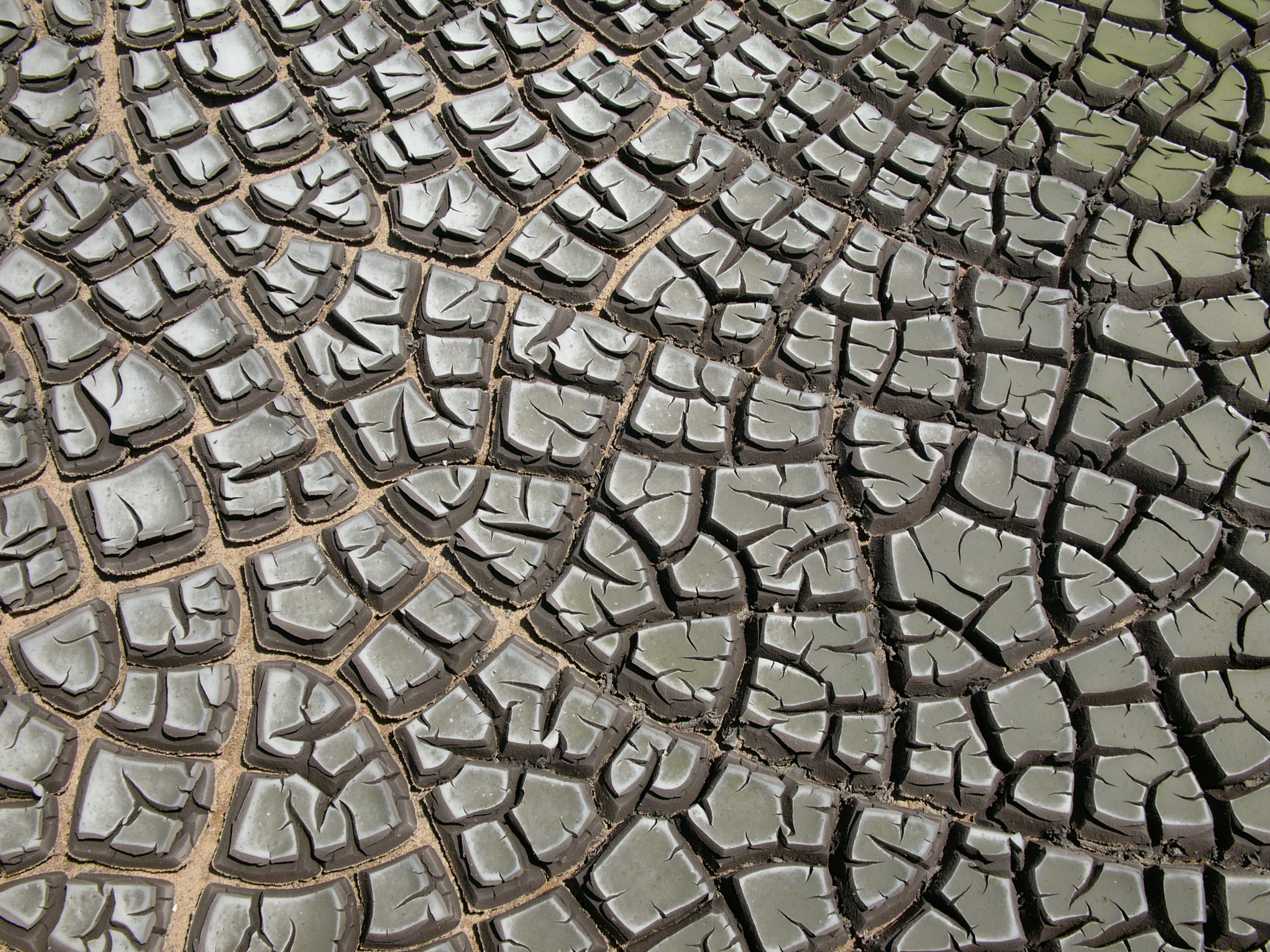
Sewage sludge after drying in a sludge drying bed.

=== Incineration ===
Incineration is also used, albeit to a much lesser degree. Incineration of sludge is less common because of air emissions concerns and the supplemental fuel (typically natural gas or fuel oil) required to burn the low calorific value sludge and vaporize residual water. On a dry solids basis, the fuel value of sludge varies from about 9,500 British thermal units per pound (5,300 cal/g) of undigested sewage sludge to 2,500 British thermal units per pound (1,400 cal/g) of digested primary sludge. Stepped multiple hearth incinerators with high residence time and fluidized bed incinerators are the most common systems used to combust wastewater sludge. Co-firing in municipal waste-to-energy plants is occasionally done, this option being less expensive assuming the facilities already exist for solid waste and there is no need for auxiliary fuel. Incineration tends to maximize heavy metal concentrations in the remaining solid ash requiring disposal; but the option of returning wet scrubber effluent to the sewage treatment process may reduce air emissions by increasing concentrations of dissolved salts in sewage treatment plant effluent.

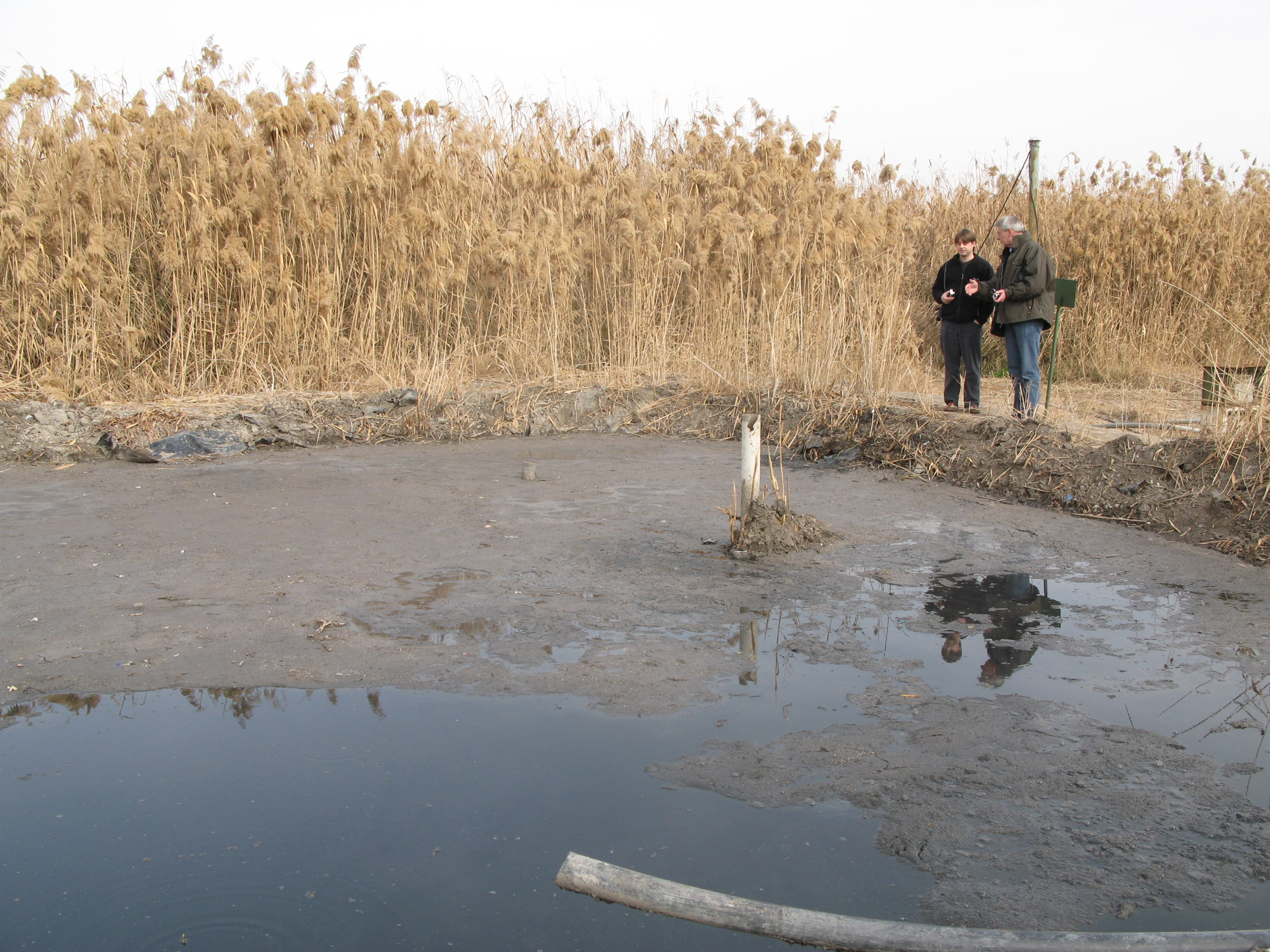
This simple evaporative sludge drying bed near Damascus in Syria illustrates the initial consistency of primary sludge being discharged from the primary settling tank via the pipe in the foreground.

=== Drying beds ===
Simple sludge drying beds are used in many countries, particularly in developing countries, as they are a cheap and simple method to dry sewage sludge. Drainage water must be captured; drying beds are sometimes covered but usually left uncovered. Mechanical devices to turn over the sludge in the initial stages of the drying process are also available on the market.

Drying beds are typically composed of four layers consisting of gravel and sand. The first layer is coarse gravel that is 15 to 20 centimeters thick. Followed by fine gravel that is 10 centimeters thick. The third layer is sand that can be between 10 and 15 centimeters and serves as the filter between the sludge and gravel. Sludge dries up and water percolates to the first layer that is collected at the drainage pipe that is beneath all layers.

=== Emerging technologies ===
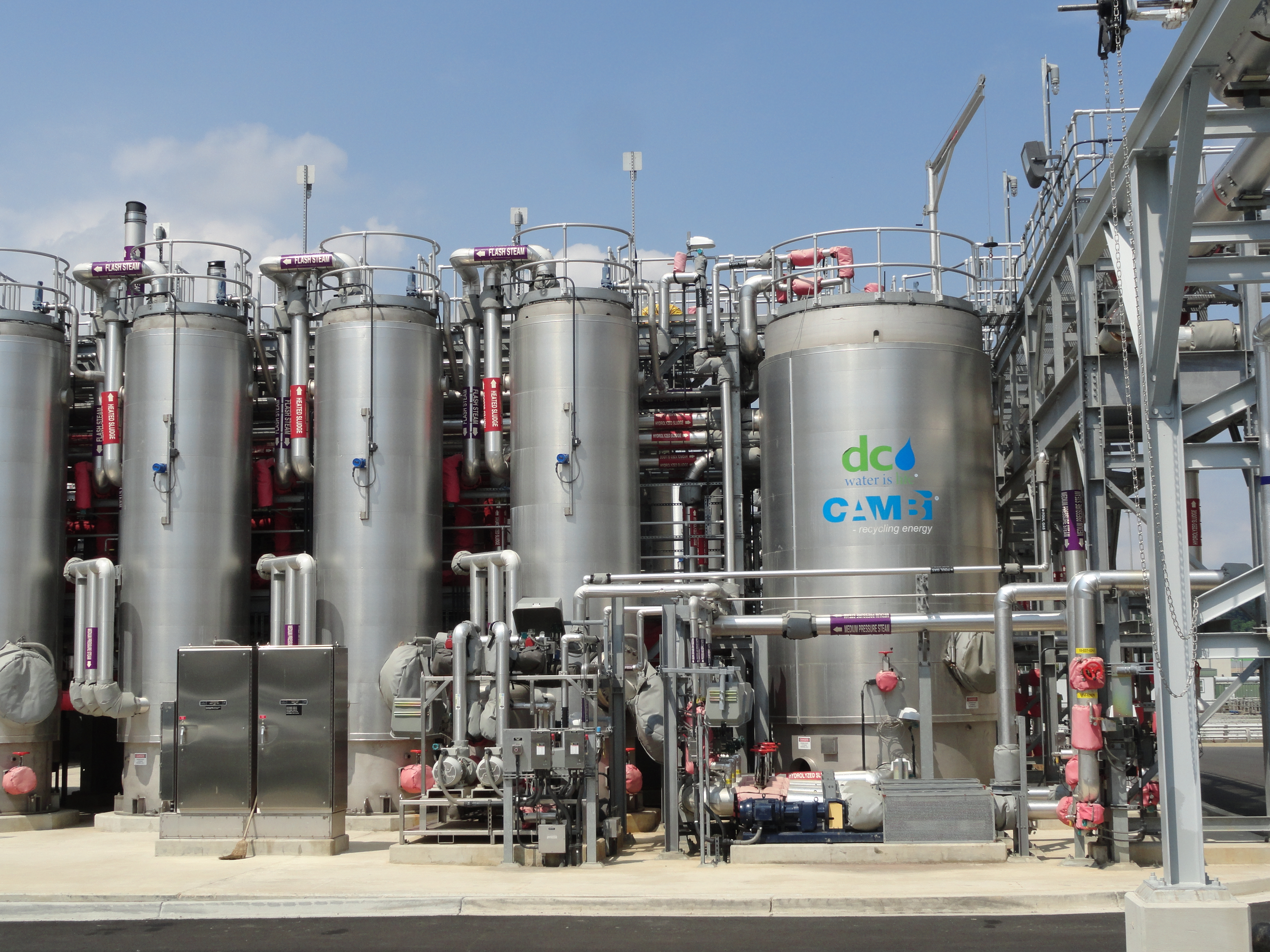
The thermal hydrolysis system at the Blue Plains treatment plant in Washington, D.C. is the largest in the world as of 2016.

- Phosphorus recovery from sewage sludge or from sludge dewatering streams is receiving increased attention particularly in Sweden, Germany and Canada, as phosphorus is a limited resource (a concept also known as "peak phosphorus") and is needed as fertilizer to feed a growing world population. Phosphorus recovery methods from wastewater or sludge can be categorized by the origin of the used matter (wastewater, sludge liquor, digested or non-digested sludge, ash) or by the type of recovery processes (precipitation, wet-chemical extraction and precipitation, thermal treatment). Research on phosphorus recovery methods from sewage sludge has been carried out in Sweden and Germany since around 2003, but the technologies currently under development are not yet cost effective, given the current price of phosphorus on the world market.
- The Omni Processor is a process that was under development in 2015 and treats sewage sludge. It can generate a surplus of electrical energy if the input materials have the right level of dryness.
- Thermal depolymerization produces light hydrocarbons from sludge heated to 250 °C and compressed to 40 MPa.
- Thermal hydrolysis is a two-stage process combining high-pressure boiling of sludge, followed by a rapid decompression. This combined action sterilizes the sludge and makes it more biodegradable, which improves digestion performance. Sterilization destroys pathogens in the sludge resulting in it exceeding the stringent requirements for land application (agriculture). Thermal hydrolysis systems are operating at sewage treatment plants in Europe, China and North America, and can generate electricity as well as high quality sludge.
- The use of a green approach, such as phytoremediation, has been recently proposed as a valuable tool to improve sewage sludge contaminated by trace elements and persistent organic pollutants.

== Disposal or use as fertilizer ==
When a liquid sludge is produced, further treatment may be required to make it suitable for final disposal. Sludges are typically thickened and/or dewatered to reduce the volumes transported off-site for disposal. Processes for reducing water content include lagooning in drying beds to produce a cake that can be applied to land or incinerated; pressing, where sludge is mechanically filtered, often through cloth screens to produce a firm cake; and centrifugation where the sludge is thickened by centrifugally separating the solid and liquid. Sludges can be disposed of by liquid injection to land or by disposal in a landfill.

There is no process which completely eliminates the need to dispose of treated sewage sludge.

Much sludge originating from commercial or industrial areas is contaminated with toxic materials that are released into the sewers from industrial or commercial processes or from domestic sources. Elevated concentrations of such materials may make the sludge unsuitable for agricultural use and it may then have to be incinerated or disposed of to landfill.

Despite the apparent unsuitability of at least some sewage sludge, application to farm-land remains a commonly used option

=== Examples ===
==== Edmonton, Alberta, Canada ====
The Edmonton Composting Facility, in Edmonton, Alberta, Canada, is the largest sewage sludge composting site in North America.

==== New York City, U.S. ====
Sewage sludge can be superheated and converted it into pelletized granules that are high in nitrogen and other organic materials. In New York City, for example, several sewage treatment plants have dewatering facilities that use large centrifuges along with the addition of chemicals such as polymer to further remove liquid from the sludge. The product which is left is called "cake," and that is picked up by companies which turn it into fertilizer pellets. This product, also called biosolid, is then sold to local farmers and turf farms as a soil amendment or fertilizer, reducing the amount of space required to dispose of sludge in landfills.

==== Southern California, U.S. ====
In the very large metropolitan areas of southern California inland communities return sewage sludge to the sewer system of communities at lower elevations to be reprocessed at a few very large treatment plants on the Pacific coast. This reduces the required size of interceptor sewers and allows local recycling of treated wastewater while retaining the economy of a single sludge processing facility and is an example of how sewage sludge can help solve an energy crisis.

== See also ==
- Fecal sludge management
