= Flottweg =

Flottweg SE
- Type: Joint-stock company
- Industry: Separation Technology, engineering and service
- Founded: 1932
- Headquarters: Vilsbiburg, Deutschland
- Key people: Dr. Kersten Link
- Products: Decanter, Separator, Belt Press
- Revenue: 220 million EUR
- Number of employees: more than 900 employees worldwide
- Website: flottweg.com

Flottweg SE is a manufacturer of machines and systems for mechanical liquid-solid separation. The headquarters is located in Vilsbiburg (Bavaria), Germany. The company develops and produces decanter centrifuges, separators and belt presses. Flottweg has subsidiaries and branch offices with service centers in the United States (Flottweg Separation Technology, Inc.), People´s Republic of China, Russia, Italy, Poland, France, Australia and Mexico.

== History ==
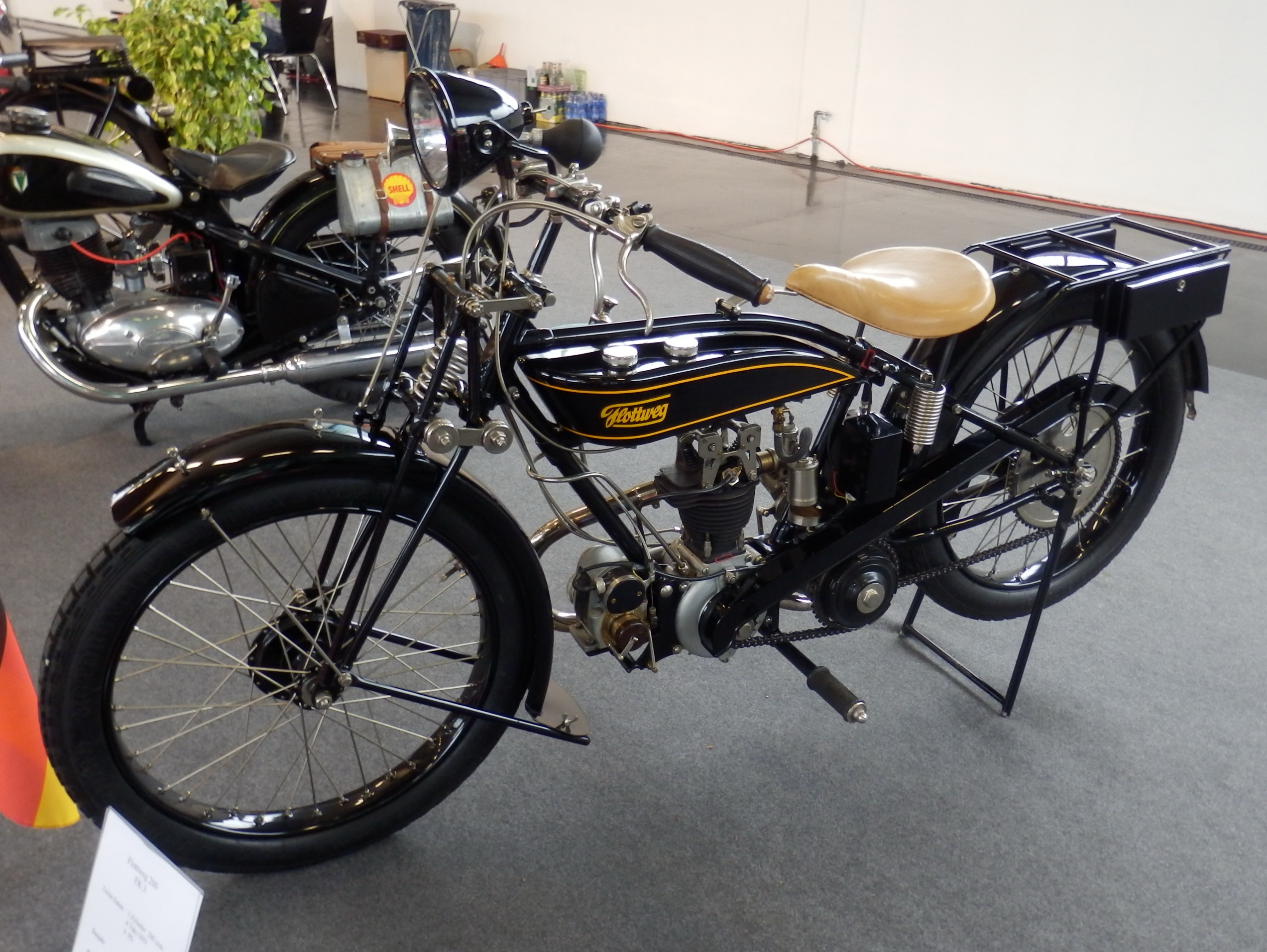
1924 Flottweg motorcycle

In 1910 Gustav Otto (son of the inventor of the gasoline engines) founded Otto-Flugzeugwerke (Gustav Otto Aircraft Machine Works) based in Munich, Germany. On March 7, 1916, this company was registered as the Bayrische Flugzeugwerke (Bavarian Aircraft Works), the precursor to Bayrische Motorenwerke (Bayerischen Motorenwerke“ or "BMW"). In 1918, Otto opened a new factory in Munich, and began in 1920 to produce motorized bicycles, which were given the brand name "Flottweg" as the German words "flott" means "quick" and "weg" means "away". In 1932' Dr. Georg Bruckmayer acquired the Flottweg name and founded the engine factory "Flottweg-Motoren-Werke". In 1933, the company began manufacturing and distributing motorcycles and aircraft engines in Munich.

In 1943 World War II forced Flottweg to move to Vilsbiburg. In 1946, the company began to manufacture specialized equipment for the printing industry (until 1984).

In 1953 Flottweg expanded its into a business sector: the production of liquid-solid separation machines. The first product was the Flottweg Decanter, a solid bowl decanter centrifuge; the first model, DECANTER Z1, was sold to BASF. Further development lead to a higher speed and more efficient decanter in 1964. In 1966 an adjustable impeller for decanter was added, which allowed the operator to optimise the pond depth while the decanter was operating; this was useful in the extraction of olive oil. After further development, Flottweg sold a 3-phase decanter for olive oil in Spain in 1971. In 1977 Flottweg began to manufacture belt filter presses.

By 1988 Krauss-Maffei, Munich, was the main shareholder, owning 90% of Flottweg. In 1989, under license agreement, the Krauss-Maffei product line of decanter centrifuges was procured by Flottweg. In the same year, Flottweg opened new sales and service offices in France and Russia, and in the next few years sales and service centers in Düsseldorf and Leipzig, Germany were opened.

In 1998, Flottweg acquired Veronesi, an Italian manufacturer of disc stack centrifuges. In the same year, Flottweg began to develop and produce disc stack machines at Vilsbiburg.

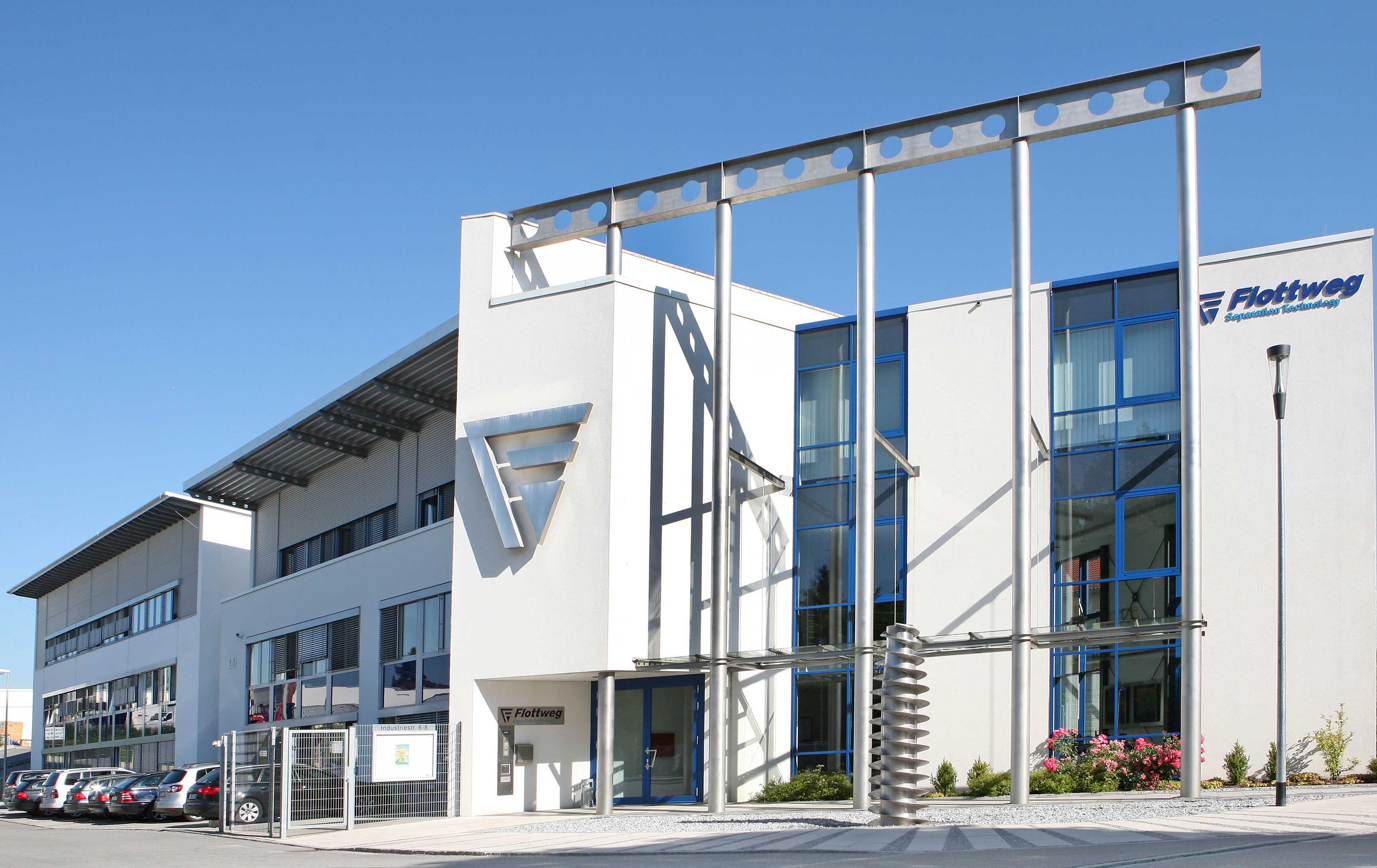
Flottweg headquarters in Vilsbiburg, Germany

In 2007, Flottweg Separation Technology, Inc. was founded in Independence, Kentucky. In 2012, Flottweg was converted to Flottweg SE, legally registered in the Societas Europaea (also called "Europe AG") in the European Union.

== Products ==
In 2015, Flottweg produces decanter centrifuges, which are used for continuous separation of solids from liquids, clarification of liquids, and classification of fine pigments. These are used to separate municipal and industrial wastewaters, in the manufacture of plastics, in extraction and processing of animal and vegetable raw materials, clarification of beverages, in the mining and processing industry, and in the processing of biofuels.

Flottweg also produces separators (disc stack centrifuges), which are used in the food and beverage, chemical, pharmaceutical and petroleum industries. The company also makes belt presses, used to produce fruit and vegetable juices, dewater spent grains, create algae and herbal extracts, and processing of coffee grounds and industrial sludge.
