= Filter press =

Tool used to separate solids and liquids

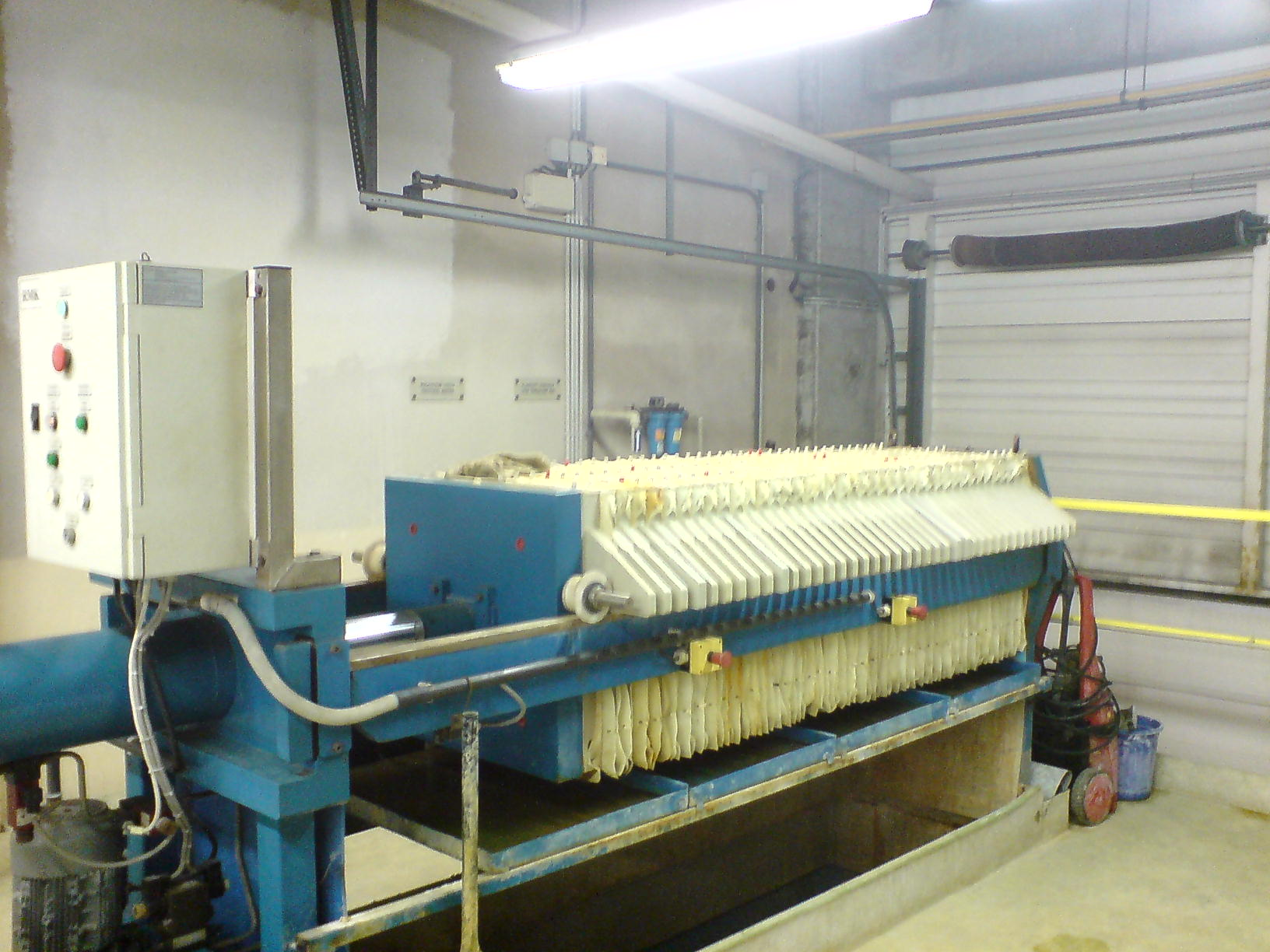
Industrial Filter press

An industrial filter press is a tool used in separation processes, specifically to separate solids and liquids. The machine stacks many filter elements and allows the filter to be easily opened to remove the filtered solids, and allows easy cleaning or replacement of the filter media.

Filter presses cannot be operated in a continuous process but can offer very high performance, particularly when low residual liquid in the solid is desired. Among other uses, filter presses are utilised in marble factories in order to separate water from mud in order to reuse the water during the marble cutting process.

== Concept behind filter press technology ==
Generally, the slurry that will be separated is injected into the centre of the press and each chamber of the press is filled. Optimal filling time will ensure the last chamber of the press is loaded before the mud in the first chamber begins to cake. As the chambers fill, pressure inside the system will increase due to the formation of thick sludge. Then, the liquid is strained through filter cloths by force using pressurized air, but the use of water could be more cost-efficient in certain cases, such as if water was re-used from a previous process.

== History ==
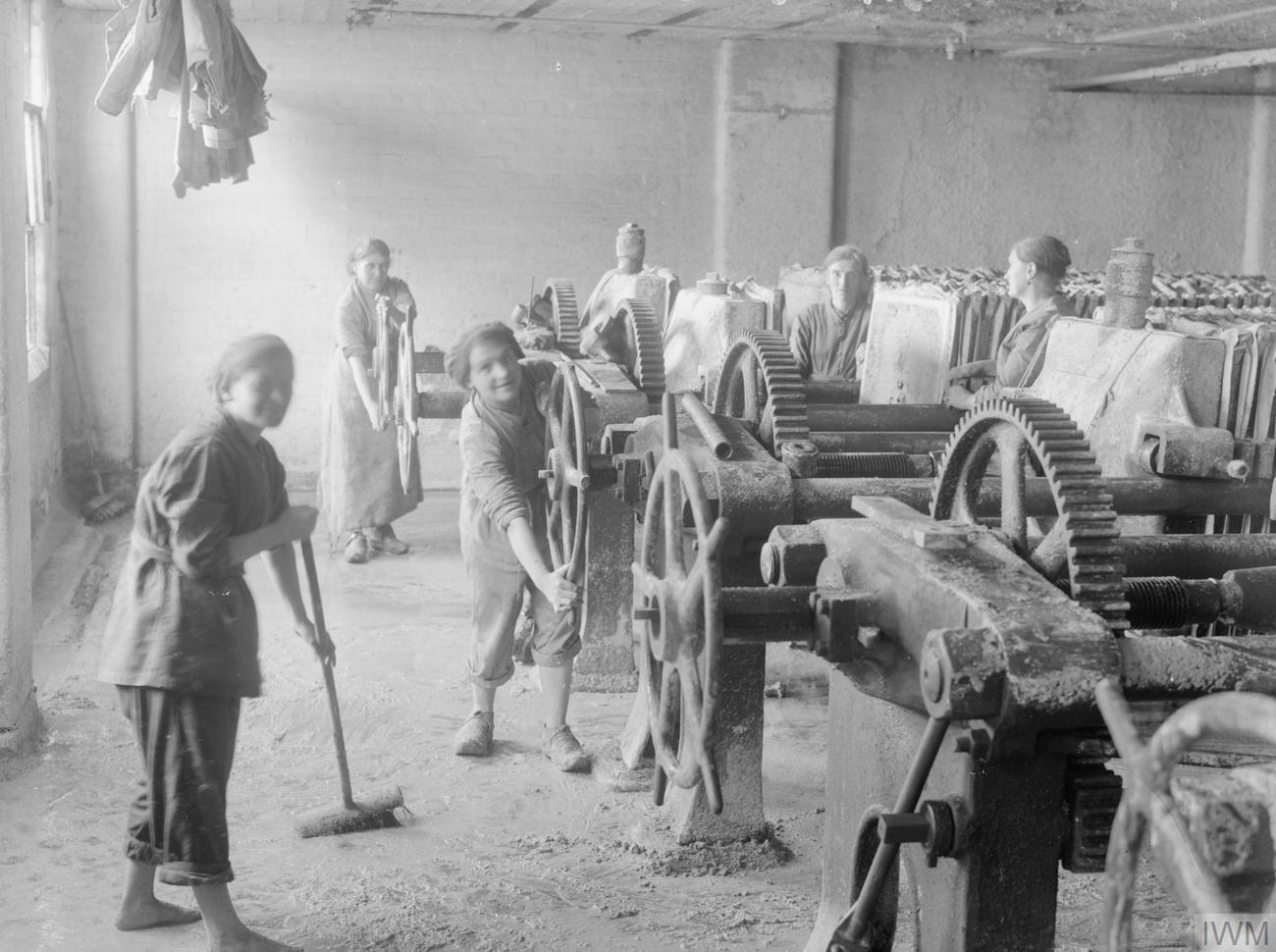
Factory workers tightening a filter press in a glucose factory, September 1918

The first form of filter press was invented in the United Kingdom in 1853, used in obtaining seed oil through the use of pressure cells. However, there were many disadvantages associated with them, such as high labour requirement and discontinuous process. Major developments in filter press technology started in the middle of 20th century. In Japan in 1958, Kenichiro Kurita and Seiichi Suwa succeeded in developing the world's first automatic horizontal-type filter press to improve the cake removal efficiency and moisture absorption. Nine years later, Kurita Company began developing flexible diaphragms to decrease moisture in filter cakes. The device enables optimisation of the automatic filtration cycle, cake compression, cake discharge and filter-cloth washing leading to the increment in opportunities for various industrial applications. A detailed historical review, dating back to when the Shang Dynasty used presses to extract tea from camellia the leaves and oil from the hips in 1600 BC, was compiled by K. McGrew.

== Types of filter presses ==
There are four main basic types of filter presses: plate and frame filter presses, recessed plate and frame filter presses, membrane filter presses and (fully) automatic filter presses.

=== Plate and frame filter press ===
A plate and frame filter press is the most fundamental design, and may be referred to as a "membrane plate filter." This type of filter press consists of many alternating plates and frames assembled with the supports of a pair of rails, with filter membranes inserted between each plate-frame pair.

- Plates provide support to the filter membranes under pressure, and have narrow slots to allow the filtrate to flow through the membrane into the plate, then out into a collection system.
- Frames provide a chamber between the membranes and plates into which the slurry is pumped and the filter cake accumulates.

The stack is compressed with sufficient force to provide a liquid-tight seal between each plate and frame, the filter membrane may have an integrated seal around the edge or the filter material itself may act as a gasket when compressed.

As the slurry is pumped through the membranes, the filter cake accumulates and becomes thicker. The filter resistance increases as well, and the process is stopped when the pressure differential reaches a point where the plates are considered full enough.

To remove the filter cake and clear the filters, the stack of plates and frames are separated and the cake either falls off or is scraped from the membranes to be collected in a tray below. The filter membranes are then cleaned using wash liquid and the stack is re-compressed ready to start the next cycle.

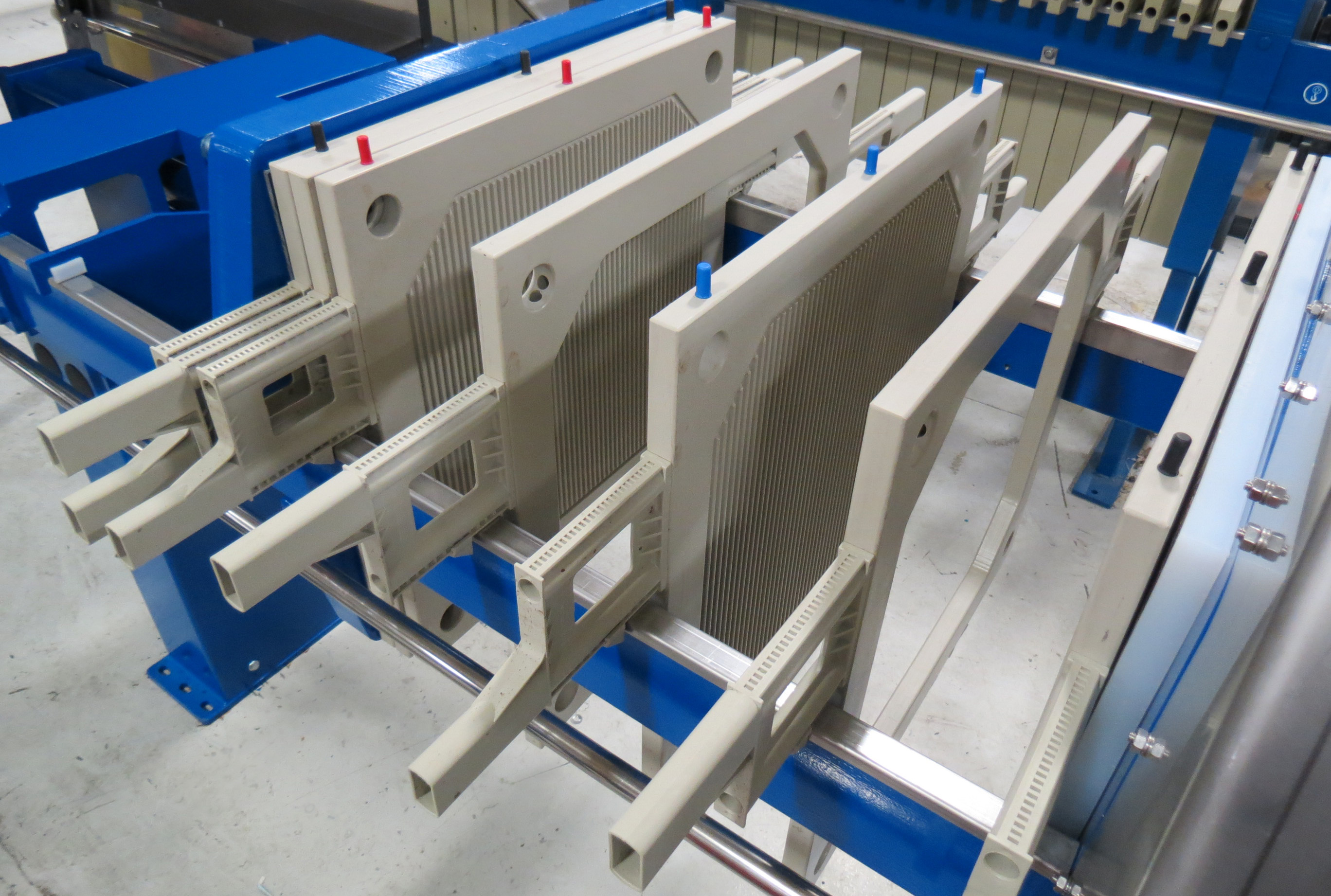
M.W. Watermark Plate and Frame Filter Press

An early example of this is the Dehne filter press, developed by A L G Dehne (1832–1906) of Halle, Germany, and commonly used in the late 19th and early 20th century for extracting sugar from sugar beet and from sugar cane, and for drying ore slurries. Its great disadvantage was the amount of labor involved in its operation.

=== (Fully) Automatic filter press ===
An automatic filter press has the same concept as the manual filter and frame filter, except that the whole process is fully automated. It consists of larger plate and frame filter presses with mechanical "plate shifters". The function of the plate shifter is to move the plates and allow rapid discharge of the filter cakes accumulated in between the plates. It also contains a diaphragm compressor in the filter plates which aids in optimizing the operating condition by further drying the filter cakes.

Fully automatic filter presses provide a high degree of automation while providing uninterrupted operation at the same time. The option of the simultaneous filter plate opening system, for example, helps to realise a particularly fast cake release reducing the cycle time to a minimum. The result is a high-speed filter press that allows increased production per unit area of filter. For this reason, these machines are used in applications with highly filterable products where high filtration speeds are required. These include, e.g. mining concentrates and residues. There are different systems for fully automatic operation. These include, e.g. the vibration/shaking devices, spreader clamp/spreader cloth version or scraping devices. The unmanned operating time of a fully automatic filter press is 24/7.

=== Recessed plate filter press ===
A recessed plate filter press does not use frames and instead has a recess in each plate with sloping edges in which the filter cloths lie, the filter cake builds up in the recess directly between two plates and when the plates are separated the sloping edges allow the cake to fall out with minimal effort. To simplify construction and usage the plates typically have a hole through the centre, passing through the filter cloth and around which it is sealed so that the slurry flows through the centre of each plate down the stack rather than inward from the edge of each plate. Although easier to clean, there are disadvantages to this method, such as longer cloth changing time, inability to accommodate filter media that cannot conform to the curved recess such as paper, and the possibility of forming uneven cake.

=== Membrane filter press ===
Membrane filter presses have a great influence on the dryness of the solid by using an inflatable membrane in the filter plates to compress remaining liquid from the filter cake before the plates are opened. Compared to conventional filtration processes, it achieves the lowest residual moisture values in the filter cake. This makes the membrane filter press a powerful and widely used system. Depending on the degree of dewatering, different dry matter contents (dry matter content – percentage by weight of dry material in the filter cake) can be achieved in the filter cake by squeezing with membrane plates. The range of achievable dry matter contents extends from 30 to over 80 percent. Membrane filter presses not only offer the advantage of an extremely high degree of dewatering; they also reduce the filtration cycle time by more than 50 percent on average, depending on the suspension. This results in faster cycle and turnaround times, which lead to an increase in productivity. The membrane inflation medium consists either of compressed air or a liquid medium (e.g. water).

== Applications ==
Filter presses are used in a huge variety of different applications, from dewatering of mineral mining slurries to blood plasma purification. At the same time, filter press technology is widely established for ultrafine coal dewatering as well as filtrate recovery in coal preparation plants. According to G.Prat, the "filter press is proven to be the most effective and reliable technique to meet today's requirement". One of the examples is Pilot scale plate filter press, which is specialized in dewatering coal slurries. In 2013 the Society for Mining, Metallurgy and Exploration published an article highlighting this specific application. It was mentioned that the use of the filter press is very beneficial to plant operations, since it offers dewatering ultraclean coal as product, as well as improving quality of water removed to be available for equipment cleaning.

Other industrial uses for automatic membrane filter presses include municipal waste sludge dewatering, ready mix concrete water recovery, metal concentrate recovery, and large-scale fly ash pond dewatering.

Many specialized applications are associated with different types of filter press that are currently used in various industries. Plate filter press is extensively used in sugaring operations such as the production of maple syrup in Canada, since it offers very high efficiency and reliability. According to M.Isselhardt, "appearance can affect the value of maple syrup and customer's perception of quality". This makes the raw syrup filtration process extremely crucial in achieving desired product with high quality and appealing form, which again suggested how highly appreciated filter press methods are in industry.

== Assessment of important characteristics ==
Here are some typical filter press calculation used for handling operation applied in waste water treatment:

=== Solids loading rate ===
S=((B x 8.34 lb/gal x s))/A
Where,

S is the solid loadings rate in lb+h⁄ft2.<r />
B is biosolids in gal⁄h
s is the % solids/ 100.
A is the plate area in ft2.

=== Net filter yield ===
$NFY=\frac{S\times P}{TCT}$

Where:

- NFY is the net filter yield in kg/h/m^{2}.
- S is the solids loadings rate in kg/h/m^{2}.
- P is the period in h.
- TCT is the total cycle time in h.

(S × P) gives the filter run time.

=== Flow rate of filtrate ===
$u=\frac{1}{A}\frac{dV}{dt}=\frac{\Delta P}{\mu\times(R_c+R_f)}$

Where:

- u is flow rate of filtrate through cloth and cake (m/s),
- dV/dt is volumetric filtration rate (m^{3}/s),
- R_{c} is the resistance of the filter cake (m-1),
- R_{f} is the initial resistance of the filter (resistance of an initial layer of cake, filter cloths, plate and channel) (m-1),
- μ is the viscosity of the filtrate (N·s/m^{2}),
- ΔP is the applied pressure difference (N/m^{2}) one side to another side of the filter medium,
- A is the filtration area (m^{2}).

Those are the most important factors that affect the rate of filtration. When filtrate pass through the filter plate, deposition of solids are formed and increases the cake thickness, which also increase Rc while Rf is assumed to be constant. The flow resistance from cake and filter medium can be studied by calculating the flow rate of filtration through them.

If the flow rate is constant, the relationship between pressure and time can be obtained. The filtration must be operated by increasing pressure difference to cope with the increase in flow resistance resulting from pore clogging. The filtration rate is mainly affected by viscosity of the filtrate as well as resistance of the filter plate and cake.

== Optimum time cycle ==
High filtration rate can be obtained from producing thin cake. However, a conventional filter press is a batch system and the process must be stopped to discharge the filter cake and reassemble the press, which is time-consuming. Practically, maximum filtration rate is obtained when the filtration time is greater than the time taken to discharge the cake and reassemble the press to allow for cloth's resistance. Properties of the filter cake affect the filtration rate, and it is desirable for the particle's size to be as large as possible to prevent pore blockage by using a coagulant. From experimental work, flow rate of liquid through the filter medium is proportional to the pressure difference. As the cake layer forms, pressure applies to the system increases and the flow rate of filtrate decreases. If the solid is desired, the purity of the solid can be increased by cake washing and air drying. Sample of filter cake can be taken from different locations and weighed to determine the moisture content by using overall material balance.

== Possible heuristics to be used during design of the process ==
The selecting of filter press type depends on the value of liquid phase or the solid phase. If extracting liquid phase is desired, then filter press is among the most appropriate methods to be used.

== Materials ==
Nowadays, filter plates are made from polymers or steel coated with polymer. They give good drainage surface for filter cloths. The plate sizes are ranged from 10 by 10 cm to 2.4 by 2.4 m and 0.3 to 20 cm for the frame thickness.

== Filter medium ==
Typical cloth areas can range from 1 m^{2} or less on laboratory scale to 1000 m^{2} in a production environment, even though plates can provide filter areas up to 2000 m^{2}. Normally, plate and frame filter press can form up to 50 mm of cake thickness, however, it can be push up to 200 mm for extreme cases. Recessed plate press can form up to 32 mm of cake thickness.

In the early days of press use in the municipal waste biosolids treatment industry, issues with cake sticking to the cloth was problematic and many treatment plants adopted less effective centrifuge or belt filter press technologies. Since then, there have been great enhancements in fabric quality and manufacturing technology that have made this issue obsolete. Unlike the US, automatic membrane filter technology is the most common method to dewater municipal waste biosolids in Asia. Moisture is typically 10-15% lower and less polymer is required—which saves on trucking and overall disposal cost.

== Operating condition ==
The operating pressure is commonly up to 7 bars for metal. The improvement of the technology makes it possible to remove large amount of moisture at 16 bar of pressure and operate at 30 bars. However, the pressure is 4-5 bars for wood or plastic frames. If the concentration of solids in the feed tank increase until the solid particles are attached to each other. It is possible to install moving blades in the filter press to reduce resistance to flow of liquid through the slurry. For the process prior to cake discharge, air blowing is used for cakes that have permeability of 10^{−11} to 10^{−15} m^{2}.

== Pre-treatment ==
Pre-treatment of the slurries before filtration is required if the solid suspension has settled down. Coagulation as pre-treatment can improve the performance of filter press because it increases the porosity of the filter cake leading to faster filtration. Varying the temperature, concentration and pH can control the size of the flocs. Moreover, if the filter cake is impermeable and difficult for the flow of filtrate, filter aid chemical can be added to the pre-treatment process to increase the porosity of the cake, reduce the cake resistance and obtain thicker cake. However, filter aids need to be able to remove from the filter cake either by physical or chemical treatment. A common filter aid is Kieselguhr, which give 0.85 voidage.

In terms of cake handling, batch filter press requires large discharge tray size in order to contain large amount of cake and the system is more expensive compared to continuous filter press with the same output.

== Washing ==
There are two possible methods of washing that are being employed, the "simple washing" and the "thorough washing". For simple washing, the wash liquor flows through the same channel as the slurry with high velocity, causing erosion of the cakes near the point of entry. Thus the channels formed are constantly enlarged and therefore uneven cleaning is normally obtained. A better technique is by thorough washing in which the wash liquor is introduced through a different channel behind the filter cloth called washing plates. It flows through the whole thickness of the cakes in opposite direction first and then with the same direction as the filtrate. The wash liquor is normally discharged through the same channel as the filtrate. After washing, the cakes can be easily removed by supplying compressed air to remove the excess liquid.

== Waste ==
Nowadays filter presses are widely used in many industries, they would also produce different types of wastes. Harmful wastes such as toxic chemical from dye industries, as well as pathogen from waste stream might accumulate in the waste cakes; hence the requirement for treating those wastes would be different. Therefore, before discharge waste stream into the environment, application of post-treatment would be an important disinfection stage. It is to prevent health risks to the local population and the workers that are dealing with the waste (filter cakes) as well as preventing negative impacts to our ecosystem. Since filter press would produce large amount of waste, if it was to be disposed by land reclamation, it is recommended to dispose to the areas that are drastically altered like mining areas where development and fixation of vegetation are not possible. Another method is by incineration, which would destroy the organic pollutants and decrease the mass of the waste. It is usually done in a closed device by using a controlled flame.

== Advantages and disadvantages compared to other competitive methods ==
Many debates have been discussed about whether or not filter presses are sufficient to compete with modern equipment currently as well as in the future, since filter presses were one of the oldest machine-driven dewatering devices. Efficiency improvements are possible in many applications where modern filter presses have the best characteristics for the job, however, despite the fact that many mechanical improvements have been made, filter presses still remain to operate on the same concept as when first invented. A lack of progress in efficiency improvements as well as a lack of research on conquering associated issues surrounding filter presses have suggested a possibility of performance inadequacy. At the same time, many other types of filter could do the same or better job as press filters. In certain cases, it is crucial to compare characteristics and performances.

== Batch filter press versus a continuous vacuum belt filter ==
Filter presses offer a wide range of application, one of its main propositions is the ability to provide a large filter area in a relatively small footprint. Surface area available is one of the most important dimensions in any filtering process, since it maximises filter flow rate and capacity. A standard size filter press offers a filter area of 216 m^{2}, whereas a standard belt filter only offers approximately 15 m^{2}.

== High-solids slurries: continuous pressure operation ==
Filter presses are commonly used to dewater high-solids slurries in metal processing plants, one of the press filter technology that could deliver the job is the Rotary Pressure Filter method, which provides continuous production in a single unit, where filtration is directed via pressure. However, in cases where solids concentration in high-solids slurries is too high (50%+), it is better to handle these slurries using vacuum filtration, such as a continuous Indexing Vacuum Belt Filter, since high concentration of solids in slurries will increase pressure and if pressure is too high, the equipment might be damaged and/or less efficient operation.
