= Fine bubble diffuser =

Pollution control technology

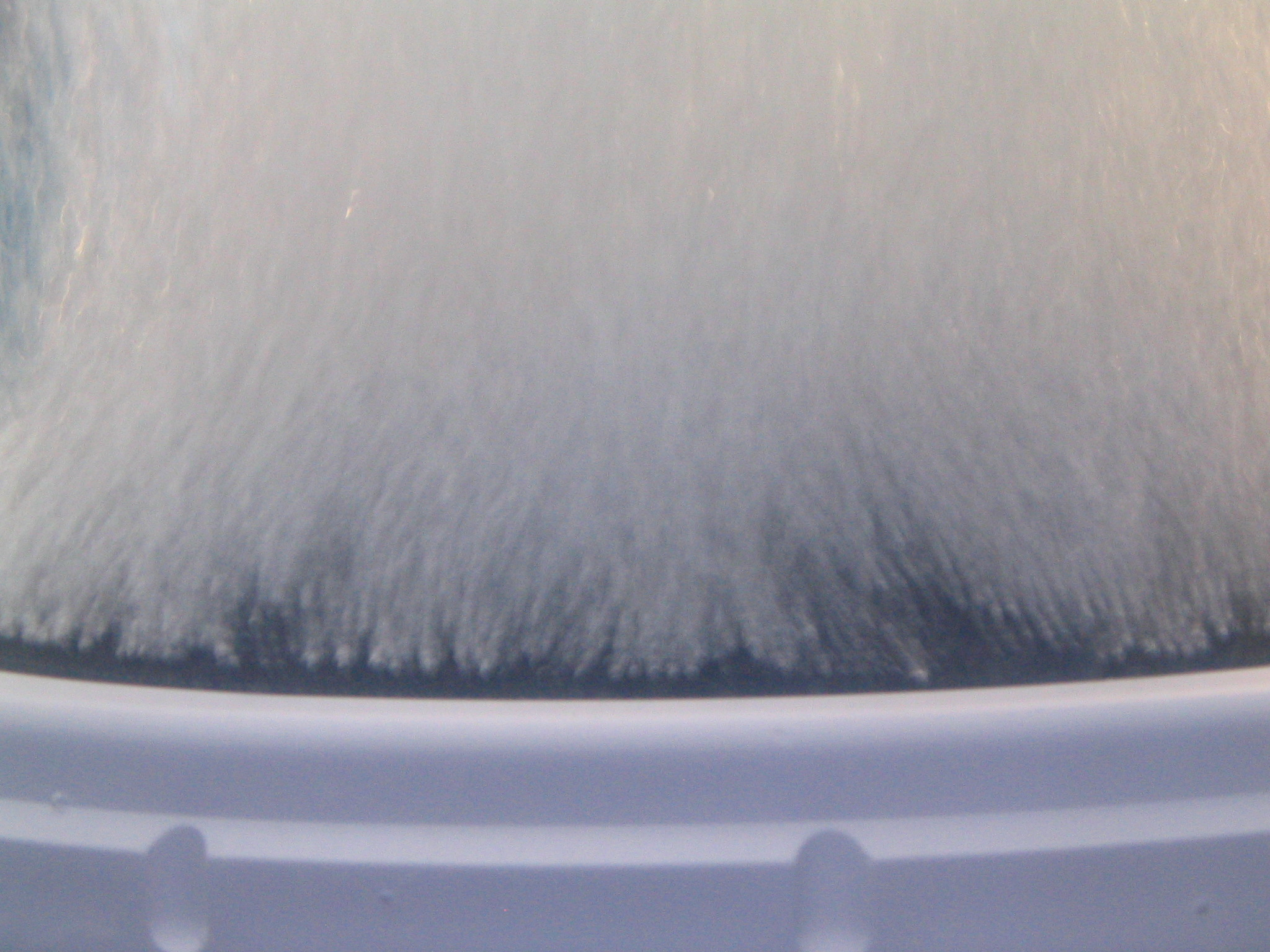
A fine bubble diffuser in a water tank

A fine bubble diffuser is a pollution control technology used to aerate wastewater for sewage treatment.

== Description ==
Fine bubble diffusers produce a plethora of very small air bubbles which rise slowly from the floor of a wastewater treatment plant or sewage treatment plant aeration tank and provide substantial and efficient mass transfer of oxygen to the water. The oxygen, combined with the food source, sewage, allows the bacteria to produce enzymes which help break down the waste so that it can settle in the secondary clarifiers or be filtered by membranes. A fine bubble diffuser is commonly manufactured in various forms: tube, disc, plate, and dome.

== Bubble size ==
The subject of bubble size is important because the aeration system in a wastewater or sewage treatment plant consumes an average of 50 to 70 percent of the energy of the entire plant. Increasing the oxygen transfer efficiency decreases the power the plant requires to provide the same quality of effluent water. Furthermore, fine bubble diffusers evenly spread out (often referred to as a 'grid arrangement') on the floor of a tank, provide the operator of the plant a great deal of operational flexibility. This can be used to create zones with high oxygen concentrations (oxic or aerobic), zones with minimal oxygen concentration (anoxic) and zones with no oxygen (anaerobic). This allows for more precise targeting and removal of specific contaminants.

The importance of achieving ever smaller bubble sizes has been a hotly debated subject in the industry as ultra fine bubbles (micrometre size) are generally perceived to rise too slowly and provide too little "pumpage" to provide adequate mixing of sewage in an aeration tank. On the other hand, the industry standard "fine bubble" with a typical discharge diameter of 2 mm is probably larger than it needs to be for many plants. Average bubble diameters of 0.9 mm are possible nowadays, using special polyurethane (PUR) or special recently developed EPDM membranes.

Fine bubble diffusers have largely replaced coarse bubble diffusers and mechanical aerators in most of the developed world and in much of the developing world. The exception would be in secondary treatment phases, such as activated sludge processing tanks, where 85 to 90 percent of any remaining solid materials (floating on the surface) are removed through settling or biological processes. The biological process uses air to encourage bacterial growth that would consume many of these waste materials, such as phosphorus and nitrogen that are dissolved in the wastewater. The larger air release openings of a coarse bubble diffuser helps to facilitate a higher oxygen transfer rate and bacterial growth. One disadvantage of using fine bubble diffusers in activated sludge tanks is the tendency of floc (particle) clogging the small air release holes.

== See also ==
- List of waste-water treatment technologies
