= Coarse bubble diffuser =

Pollution control technology

A coarse bubble diffuser is a pollution control technology used to aerate and or mix wastewater for sewage treatment.

== Description ==
Coarse bubble diffusers produce 1/4 to 1/2 inch (6.4 to 13 mm) bubbles which rise rapidly from the floor of a wastewater treatment plant or sewage treatment plant tank. They are typically used in grit chambers, equalization basins, chlorine contact tanks, and aerobic digesters, and sometimes also in aeration tanks. Generally they are better at vertically "pumping" water than at mass transfer of oxygen. Coarse bubble diffusers typically provide half the mass transfer of oxygen as compared to fine bubble diffusers, given the same air volume.

== Application ==
Often in non-Newtonian or pseudoplastic fluids, such as a digester with high solids concentration, it does make sense to use coarse bubble diffusers rather than fine bubble diffusers, due to the larger bubbles' ability to shear through more viscous wastewater.

However, over the past two decades, coarse bubble diffusers have been used less frequently, primarily due to the ever increasing cost of energy and the availability of more reliable, highly efficient fine bubble diffusers. Manufacturers of diffused aeration systems claim that converting from coarse bubble to fine bubble system should yield a 50 percent energy cost savings. Specifically, in aeration tanks, a system that utilizes coarse bubble diffusers requires 30 to 40 percent more process air than a fine bubble diffused air system to provide the same level of treatment. The exception would be in secondary treatment (or side processing) phases. In these processing tanks, floc particles, sediment and carbonate buildup tend to plug or clog the small air release openings on the fine bubble diffusers. Because of their small air openings, fine bubble diffusers cease to have an advantage. Currently, coarse bubble diffusers are the mainstay solution.

These diffusers are typically made in the shape of a perforated rectangular pipe called a wide band, or a cap of 3 inches (76 mm) in diameter with an elastomeric membrane. Other varieties of coarse bubble diffusers exist, though it is generally accepted that all of them perform similarly with respect to mass oxygen transfer. When comparing disc-shaped diffusers, the majority fail to withstand specific challenges, beyond 1 or 2 years, which include: clogging, blowing off and cracking. Any coarse bubble diffuser that eliminates these problems would deliver a huge cost-savings, not only in product replacement, but in system downtime to facilitate their exchange. This is a motivating factor considered by budget-sensitive operators at municipal waste water treatment processing plants.

== See also ==
- List of waste-water treatment technologies
