= Belt filter =

Diagram of a belt filter: sludge in the feed hopper is sandwiched between two filter cloths (shown green and purple). Fluid is extracted initially by gravity, then by squeezing the cloth through rollers. Filtrate exits through a drain, while solids are scraped off into a container.

The belt filter (sometimes called a belt press filter, or belt filter press) is an industrial machine, used for solid/liquid separation processes, particularly the dewatering of sludges in the chemical industry, mining and water treatment. Belt filter presses are also used in the production of apple juice, cider and winemaking. The process of filtration is primarily obtained by passing a pair of filtering cloths and belts through a system of rollers. The system takes a sludge or slurry as a feed, and separates it into a filtrate and a solid cake.

== Applications ==
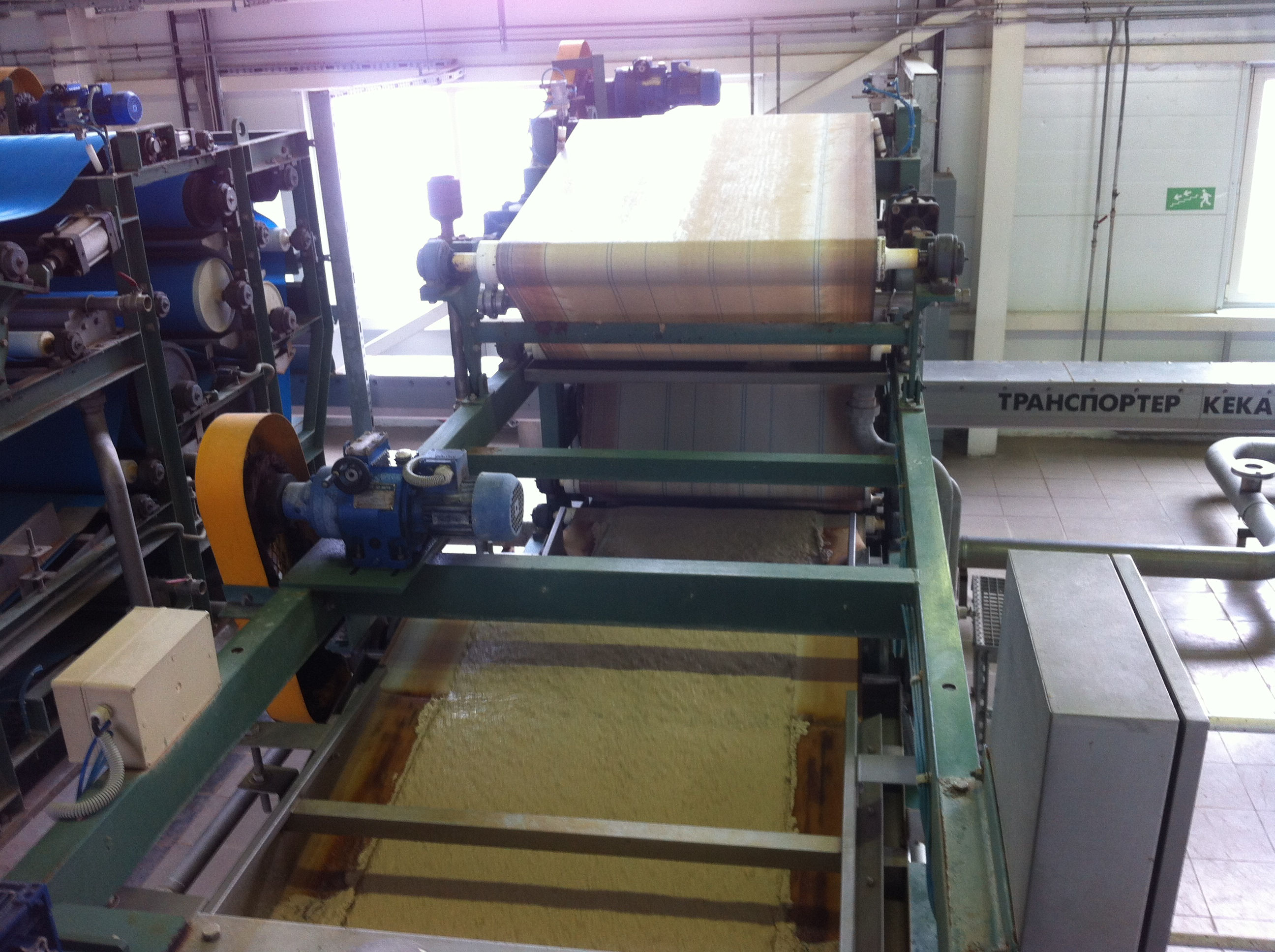
A belt filter in a wastewater treatment plant

The belt filter is mainly used for dewatering of sludge and slurry and juice extraction from apples, pears and other fruits, as well as grapes for winemaking, etc. Belt filters are used both municipally and industrially in a range of areas including urban sewage and wastewater treatment, metallurgy and mining, steel plants, coal plants, breweries, dyeing, tanneries, as well as chemical and paper factories.

The applications of a belt filter are only limited to the sludges, slurry or mashed fruit that it can process. The sludges from municipal use include raw, anaerobically digested and aerobically digested sludges, alum sludge, lime softening sludge and river water silt. In industry, any sludge or slurry is sourced from food processing wastes, pulp and paper wastes, chemical sludges, pharmaceutical wastes, industrial waste processing sludges, and petrochemical wastes. These wastes can include mixed sludge, mineral slurry, dust sediment, selected coal washing mud, biological sludge, primary sludge, and straw, wood or waste paper pulp.

Some dewatering objectives include reducing the volume to reduce the transport and storage costs, removing liquids before landfill disposal, reducing fuel requirements before further drying or incineration, producing adequate material for composting, avoiding runoff and pooling when used for land applications, and optimizing other drying processes. Belt filters are specifically designed for each of these particular applications and feeds.

== Advantages/limitations ==
There are many physical separation processes similar to the belt filter press used for dewatering, including centrifuges, vacuum-disc filters, and the plate and frame filter press. When compared to other compression filters, belt filters use relatively lower pressures. Although centrifuges have lower moisture content, lower costs and simpler operations in coal tails processing, belt filters tend to make less noise and have much quicker startup and shutdown times.

Belt filters are considered simple and reliable, with good availability, low staffing, easy maintenance and a long life. The belt filter is most advantageous when installed such that it is open and viewable at floor level for easier adjustment and monitoring. This is of course subject to what lighting and ventilation will allow.

The belt filter press is often used in wastewater treatment, and thus the odour of the feed sludge, volatile emissions and the chemicals used in treatment, may become a problem. One control method is to use odour-neutralizing chemicals such as potassium permanganate. However this only neutralizes odours and doesn’t affect any gases or chemicals involved. Although all problems can be controlled by enclosing the filter, the enclosure reduces essential visibility and easy access to the machine for maintenance and repairs, leading to the expensive automation of the process.

A belt filter press is also known for its high capacity throughput, as it is designed to handle excess capacity. It has low initial costs and low energy running costs, however, if throughput is less than 4 million gallons per day, the belt filter press may be less cost efficient than liquid transport, hiring a processing facility, or utilizing non-mechanical dewatering methods such as drying beds or reed beds.

Belt filters are less effective at processing some feeds. Unless the feed is well mixed from a digester, the use of belt filters will be more costly when processing a feed with varying solids content as this requires more operator attention, raising staffing costs. Feeds with high grease and oil content can lower the solids percentage in the cake by blinding the belt filter and all feeds need to be screened to protect the belt from being damaged by sharp objects. The type of feed may also affect the washing process. The belt filter needs to be washed frequently which consumes large amount of water and time. Water and time wastage, as well as the associated costs can be reduced by automating the washing system and using effluents.

== Designs available ==
Belt filter designs are crafted using manufacturer design and performance data, operating installations, pilot testing, surveys of similar plants and testing of the wastewater solids to obtain a desired dewatered solid percentage from the sludge or slurry to be processed.

Belt filters press have 4 main zones: preconditioning zone, gravity drainage zone, linear compression (low-pressure) zone and roller compression (high-pressure) zone. Preconditioned slurry, which is flocculated and/or coagulated depending on the feed and process, is thickened in the gravity drainage zone. The gravity drainage zone is a flat or inclined belt where gravity drainage of free water occurs The gravity drainage area is sized according to feed solid concentrations. The standard size can be used for solids concentrations of 1.5 percent or greater, but a setup with a longer drainage area or extended size should be used for 1.5 to 2.5 percent feed solids for more free water drainage before compression. For dilute sludge with feed solids of less than 1.5 percent, an independent gravity drainage belt can be used. This belt is used only in the gravity drainage area, not in the pressure zones. The pressure or wedge zones use two belts, upper and lower, to sandwich the feed together, but an independent gravity zone has its own separate belt, making the belt filter a three-belt system. Depending on the required conditions of the cake, belt filters can have added washing stages and, infrared, hot gas or even microwave drying stages.

Belt filters are very versatile and are made to suit the sludges, slurries or mashed fruit to be processed. For a feed or treatment process which produces unpleasant odours, volatile emissions, pathogens and hazardous gases like hydrogen sulphide the belt filter can include fume hoods or even be completely enclosed in a gas tight housing. Due to the reduced visibility and increased corrosion associated with enclosure, the belt filter process can also be automated. Large filtration areas, additional rollers and a variable belt speed can be found in advanced belt press filter designs.

== Process characteristics ==
Belt press filters are designed for solids capacity, by weight or volume, rather than wastewater flow. Solids concentration must be determined based on the concentration of primary solids in the feed and further solids that may precipitate during treatment. Solids concentration for a process will vary, thus the design must have the capacity to deal with varying feed solids concentration.

The feed to a belt press filter depends on the type of solids, desired product and filter design. For most sludge types the feed dry solids concentration is typically in the range of 1-10%. The resulting dewatered sludge (or cake) dry solids concentration typically falls in the range of 12-50%. Dilute feed solids concentration results in a cake of higher moisture content whilst a higher feed solids concentration yields an improved solids filtration rate and drier end product.

The input to a belt press filter is generally measured as the rate of dry solids loading (mass of dry solids per time per belt width). Again, the input solids loading is dependent on the sludge type and filter media, thus there is great variation in the dry solids loading rates of operating belt press filters. Typically, lower range solids loading rates fall in the range of 40–230 kg/h/m belt width and high range solids loading rates fall in the range of 300–910 kg/h/m belt width. Whilst loading is important for measuring production rate, it is also important to consider the thickness of the cake that forms in the gravity drainage section. Cake thickness affects the permeability of the filtration media and the filtration rate. Testing for the particular sludge type must be conducted to determine the optimum cake thickness. In some cases where filtrate recovery is important, it may be necessary to introduce a cake washing step.

The primary objective of a belt press filter is to dewater process sludge and much of this dewatering occurs in the gravity drainage zone. The gravity drainage zone can achieve a 5 to 10 percent increase in solids concentration. The degree of dewatering in the gravity drainage zone is greatly dependent on the type of solids, the filter media and the sludge conditioning. The dewatering achieved in the gravity drainage zone is adversely affected if the sludge is poorly spread across the belt or the residence time is insufficient. Sludge conditioning is the addition of chemicals to promote flocculation of particles to form a thickened sludge and to promote dewatering. Dewatering can be promoted by the addition of surfactant and flocculation is achieved via the addition of high molecular weight polymer. Flocculation is improved with optimum polymer dosage, polymer dilution and mixing. The pH of the feed slurry must also be monitored and controlled as low pH decreases flocculation. It is important to find the optimum value for each conditioning parameter as too much polymer or mixing can have a negative impact on flocculation and greatly increase operating expenses. The effects of sludge conditioning are most apparent in the gravity drainage zone which can be easily replicated on a laboratory scale where the optimum conditioning strategy can be determined. For a belt press filter to be industrially viable it must be economically efficient and thus maximum throughput is desired. Without sufficient conditioning, the gravity drainage is generally the limiting process step, but with optimum dilution the limiting process step can be shifted to the compression zone.

In the compression zone of a belt press filter, the filter cake is compressed between the two belts and passed over rollers to exert pressure on the cake. There is an optimum number of rollers above which a drier product is not necessarily the result. Drier product is obtained from reduced belt speed rather than increased pressing time.

The overall performance of a belt press filter is improved where variations in parameters such as sludge type, feed solids concentration and conditioning are minimised.

The efficiency of a belt press filter is often assessed based on the dry solids content of the product cake, solids recovery and lateral migration of sludge on the belt. Solids recovery is the percentage of dry solids recovered from the feed sludge. Solids recovery is dependent on the filter media which must be selected for good permeability to promote dewatering but with pore diameter sufficiently small so that solids recovery is not greatly decreased. It is important that the belt press filter has an effective belt washing section so that blinding does not decrease the permeability of the belt. Solids recovery is directly related to filtrate quality and thus the filter media and process arrangement must satisfy the desired cake and filtrate qualities. Dry solids content is a measure of the degree of dewatering. The degree of dewatering is increased when the belt speed is decreased. Lowering the belt speed reduces the capacity of the process. The following correlation relates input mass flow rate to belt speed:

$Q_0=m_0 s_b L_{sludge0}$

Where Q_{0} = mass flow rate (kg/s), m_{0} = mass loading (kg/m^{2}), s_{b} = belt speed (m/s) and L_{sludge0} = initial width of sludge across the belt (m). Thus to maintain industrial scale economic throughput at lower belt speed, the mass loading and width of sludge across the belt must be increased. It has been found that increasing the solids loading slightly decreases the dry solids concentration of the cake while significantly increasing the potential for sludge to overflow the belt. Lateral migration of sludge on the belt is a measure of how the sludge spreads across the width of the belt. Increased lateral sludge migration means that sludge is escaping the edge of the belt and overflowing into the filtrate. Therefore, increased lateral sludge migration negatively impacts filtrate quality and dry solids recovery.

Generally, the minimum design discharge cake thickness is 3–5 mm. This ensures that the cake is thick enough to discharge and is easily removed from the belt.

== Heuristics of the design ==
In order of increasing cost and decreasing product moisture the most common dewatering options are a thickener, deep bed thickening, belt presses and membrane filter presses. In general centrifuges and other competing technologies do not show a significant cost advantage compared to the belt press filter, for the same cake dryness. The cost of flocculant is often a major operating cost of dewatering equipment. Belt press filters in general have the lowest flocculant consumption for any of the listed processes excluding membrane filter presses and centrifuges.

Increasing the feed solid concentration increases the solid filtration rate, minimises cake moisture content and produces a more homogeneous cake all of which are desirable outcomes. If increasing the feed solid concentration is not practical the addition of flocculants in a pre-treatment step has a similar result. The optimum dosage level of flocculant can be found by monitoring the viscosity of the slurry.

Homogeneous cakes are desirable as if the feed slurry is too dilute the filter cake will contain higher moisture content as a result of stratification. The minimum feed concentration that results in a homogeneous cake is determined by observing a sample of the slurry. If rapid settling occurs the filter cake formed will not be homogeneous and the filtration rate is decreased.

The minimum cake discharge thickness for horizontal belt press filters is in the region of 5 mm.

The choice of belt is critical to the function of the belt press filter and a wide variety of materials and weaves are available. The filter cloth for a belt press filter should be as open as possible while maintaining the desired filtrate clarity or, if precoat is used, to prevent the loss of precoat. Lighter cloths produce a clearer filtrate and do not block as rapidly however their durability and life span is significantly shorter than heavier cloths. Both seamless and seamed belts are available. Seamed belts wear faster at the seam and cause wear at the rollers and the doctor blade. Zipper-type and clipper-type seamed belts are also available with the zipper-type having a longer life span as they provide less discontinuity. Seamless belts have the longest life span but are more expensive. Also it should be ensured that the belt press is compatible with a seamless belt.

Increasing the temperature of the feed slurry decreases the viscosity of the liquid phase. This is beneficial as it increases the filtration rate and decreases the cake moisture. The same advantages can be obtained by other drying methods such as passing dry steam through the deliquored cake to raise the temperature of the remaining moisture, or other drying methods can be utilised.

Cake thickness may have to be controlled or restricted when cake washing is required or the final cake moisture is a critical parameter. When cake washing time is a dominating factor the maximum filtration rate will occur when the minimum cake thickness for discharge is achieved. The time required for washing is increased by the square of the ratio of cake thicknesses. For example, if the thickness of the cake is doubled the washing time will increase roughly by a factor of 4.

== Necessary post-treatment systems ==
Completely clear filtrate cannot be obtained using belt press filters except in rare circumstances. Thus further treatment may be required for the filtrate before it is reused or discharged as waste. If the filter is downstream of a clarifier or thickener the filtrate (and wash water) can be recycled back into the clarifier to reduce the required filtrate clarity and allows for the use of more durable cloths. If recycling or reuse is not an option the filtrate should be discharged subject to legislation and license requirements. Further treatment of clarified water (filtration or chemical treatment) may be required before discharge.

The filter cake usually has a high enough solid concentration to allow for all types of disposal methods without further treatment including recycling back into the process, landfill/composting and incineration. The polymer content makes filter cake from a belt press filter more suited to the aforementioned disposal methods than a cake conditioned with ferric chloride and lime which can occur with other dewatering processes.

== Recent developments ==
Significant developments in belt press filter technology include: cloth developments, using three belts and, the V-fold belt. Cloth developments include the double weave which incorporates different yarn types to combine the specific advantages of each. A double weave woven wire belt is also available which has a better life span and durability than a conventional wire belt.

A belt press filter using three belts can achieve independent speeds and have different belt types for the pressure and gravity zones. This allows the filter system to accommodate higher hydraulic loadings occurring with dilute feed sludge (feed solid concentration below 1.5%). The three belt system is more efficient with both a higher production rate and cake solid concentration at the expense of mechanical complexity.

The V-fold belt is similar to the belt filter press with the main difference being that only a single belt, folded along the centreline is used. The technology has not been widely proven. A final dry weight solids content of 9-13% can usually be achieved; this is smaller than competing technologies. Currently this technology is suited to small-scale applications (up to approximately 3000 L of slurry per hour as the maximum belt size is 0.75 m). V-fold belts have a small footprint, low energy and wash water consumption and low capital and operating costs. They are self-tracking and can process sludge of varying composition, reducing operator involvement.

== See also ==
- List of waste-water treatment technologies
