= Rock Creek Trails =

Hiking trail

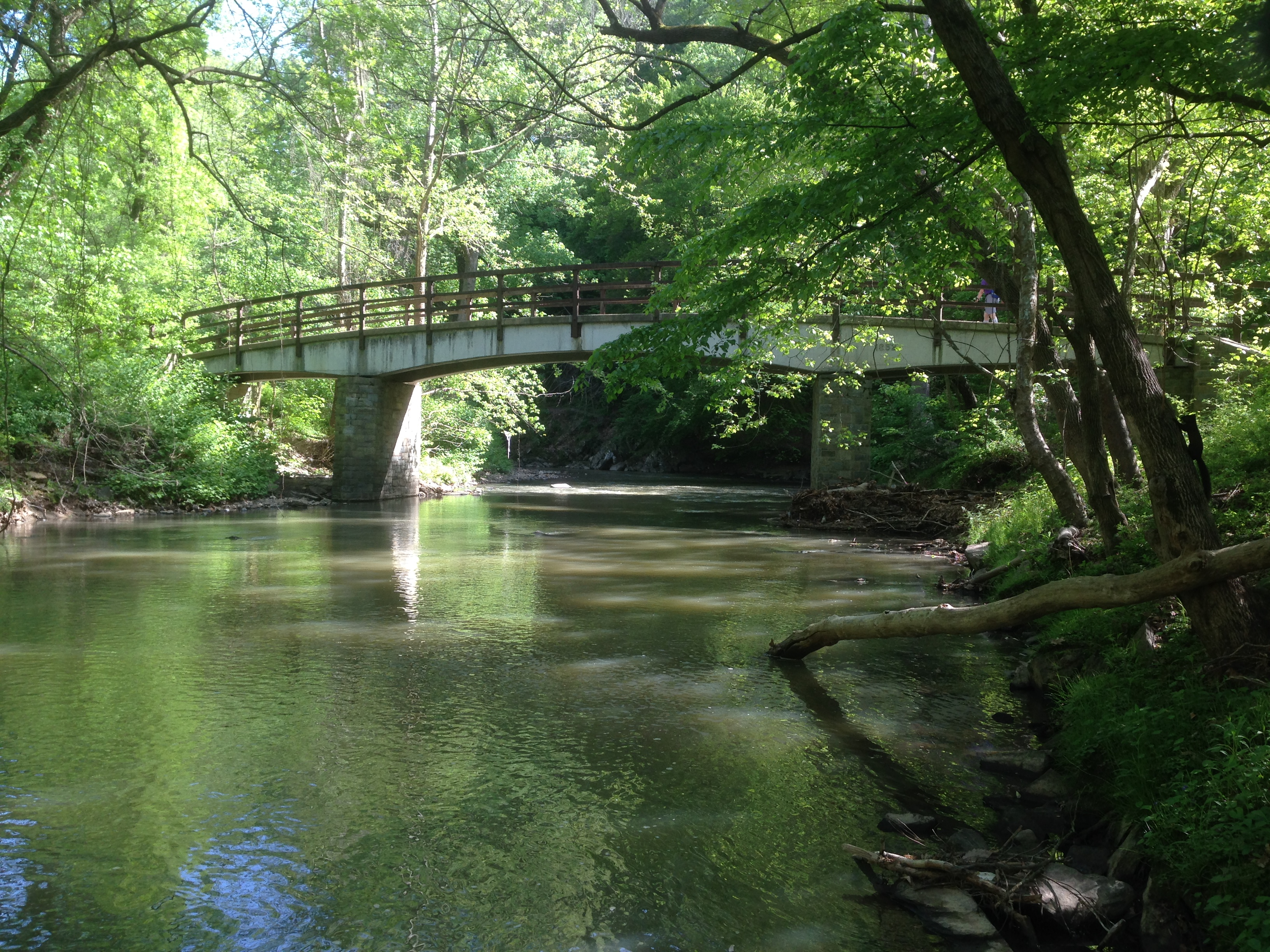
- Jusserand Footbridge along the Rock Creek Park Trail
- Length: 22 miles + 15 miles of connecting trails
- Location: Washington, DC, Montgomery County, MD
- Established: 1967
- Trailheads: Lake Needwood, Tidal Basin
- Use: Hiking, biking
- Elevation gain/loss: 394 feet
- Highest point: Lake Needwood Parking Lot, 397 feet
- Lowest point: Tidal Basin, 3 feet
- Sights: Smithsonian National Zoo, Kennedy Center for the Performing Arts, Lincoln Memorial, John Ericsson Memorial, First Air Mail Flight Marker
- Surface: Asphalt

Bicycle Map in Rock Creek National Park
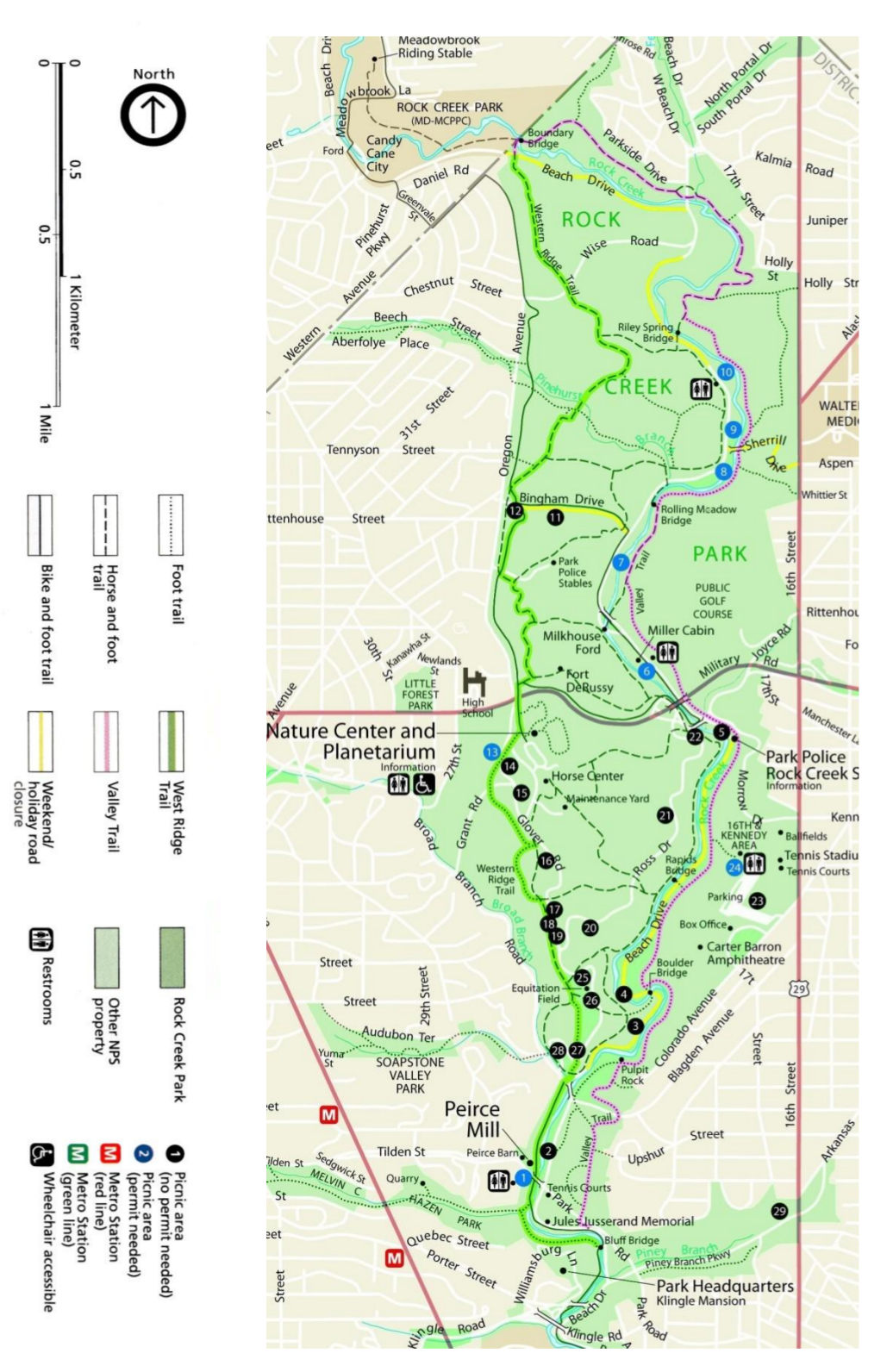

The Rock Creek Trails are a series of trails through the Rock Creek valley and along the Potomac River in Washington, D.C., and Montgomery County, Maryland. The main route extends 22 miles from Lake Needwood in Maryland to the Inlet Bridge in Washington, D.C., with a loop in the north part of Rock Creek Park and other trails through the Klingle Valley, Turkey Branch Valley, and along the North Branch of Rock Creek. Three separate trails comprise the main Rock Creek Trail route; others connect to it. The section along the Potomac River from Arlington Memorial Bridge to Rock Creek is sometimes called the Shoreline Trail.

The trails are some of the oldest recreational trails in the Washington, D.C., region; some parts were built on bridle trails dating to the early 20th century. They are heavily used for recreation and transportation.

== District of Columbia ==
Physical segments of the trails trace back to bridle trails that used several bridges across the creek. These bridges were constructed by the National Park Service (NPS) in Rock Creek Park before 1904. Parts of the bridle trail, and several of the bridges, were rebuilt two years after a 1932 flood.

The idea of a set of shared-use trails along Rock Creek and the Potomac was born in the 1960s trail movement. In August 1963, the Park Service decided to experiment with ways to make the park more enticing to cyclists and other active recreation, so they closed mile-long Ross Drive to cars from 6 a.m. to noon on Sundays.

Planning for a separate trail system was undertaken by the Department of the Interior in its 1965 "Trails for America" report, part of President Lyndon Johnson's trail movement. The report suggested creating a shared-use trail along Rock Creek, one of many trails for the D.C. area. That same year, another report—“Fort Park System, A Re-evaluation Study of Fort Drive, Washington, D.C.”—suggested running the Fort Circle Trail through the park.

=== Rock Creek and Potomac Parkway Trail ===
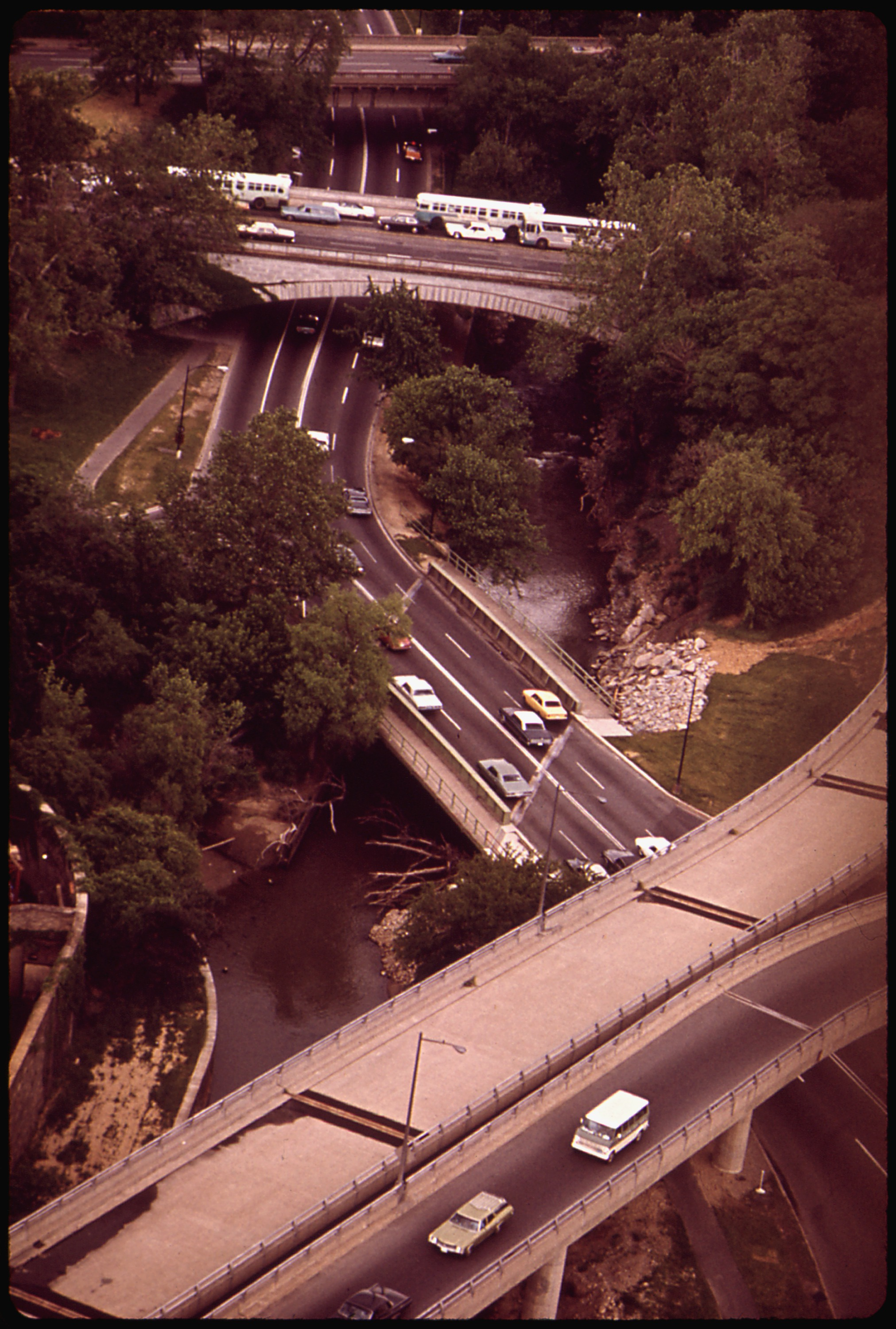
Aerial view of Rock Creek and Potomac Parkway Trail below the L Street Bridge, at center, 1973

The Rock Creek and Potomac Parkway Trail is a 1.91-mile-long trail from the Inlet Bridge in West Potomac Park to the Smithsonian Zoo. It consists of two pieces, the first – the Shoreline Trail or Promenade – extending from West Potomac Park at the Inlet Bridge along the DC shore of the Potomac River to Rock Creek, and a second along the Rock Creek and Potomac Parkway and Beach Drive to the Zoo Tunnel where it connects to the Rock Creek Park Trail.

The first part of the Shoreline section, between Memorial Bridge and Virginia Ave, NW, was constructed in 1964 as part of the Roosevelt Bridge construction. By 1990 it was extended south to the Inlet Bridge. The section between Memorial and Inlet bridges was completed sometime between 1964 and 1979.

The Rock Creek Parkway section got its start in 1971 after the Park Service set aside a lane of the Parkway north of Virginia Avenue for a week to promote commuting by bicycle. The experiment was a success at encouraging bike use, but caused traffic jams so the Park Service paved bridle paths immediately to the west of the creek. They paved the section from P Street to Calvert that had existed since the park was founded, except for the section of bridle path between P and Q streets was built in conjunction with the Pentagon in 1942 when that project needed dirt and the park service needed dirt removed. This included two bridges, the Lyon's Mill and Saddle Club footbridges, that were built in 1934 and a connection to the C&O Canal towpath. The trail was extended two miles to Bluff Bridge in 1972.

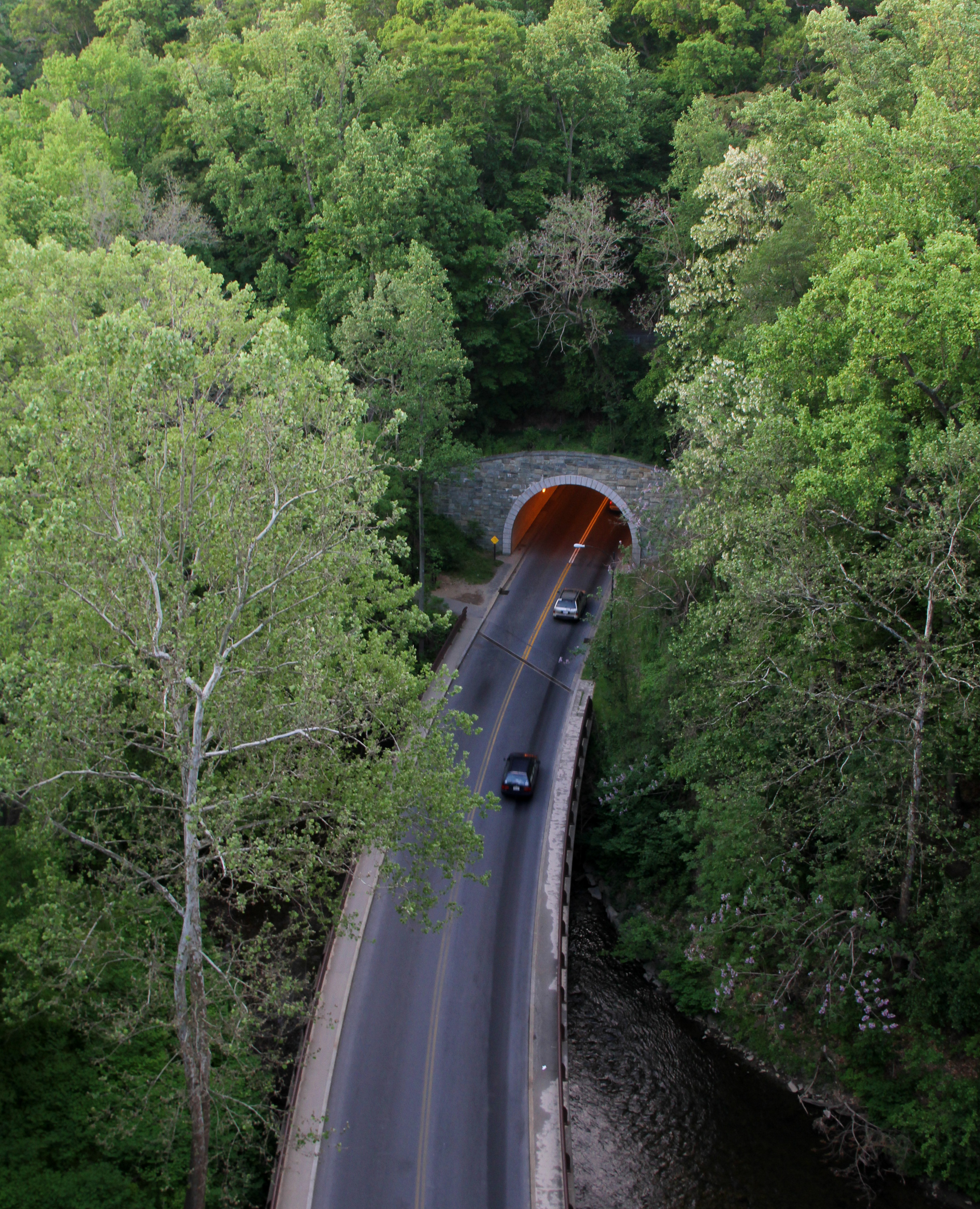
Beach Drive and the Rock Creek Trail over Rock Creek, 2010

Since its original completion in the 1970s, the trail has been improved and widened many times.

- In 1981–82 the parkway bridge over Rock Creek at L Street was replaced and as part of that project a separate trail bridge was built. The trail bridge replaced a narrow section of the old bridge that had served as part of the bike path.
- In 1997, the Shoreline Trail section was repaved and realigned.
- In 2007–08, the Park Service and Federal Highway Administration rehabilitated the Rock Creek Parkway between Virginia Avenue and P Street and at the same time widened and repaved the trail, and installed wooden barriers between the trail and roadway in places.
- In 2007, the connection between the trail and the Capital Crescent Trail was improved as part of Phase II of Georgetown Waterfront Park, with several blocks of sidepath constructed south of Water Street. This replaced a temporary connection built in 2000–01 following the handover of the land from the District to the NPS.
- In 2009, as part of phase III of the Georgetown Waterfront Park, the section of the trail between Virginia Ave and F Street was resurfaced, an existing unpaved social trail was paved and the nearby bridge over Rock Creek, connecting the trail to the waterfront, was resurfaced.
- In 2018, DDOT built a protected bikeway along Water Street that further connected the Rock Creek Parkway Trail to the Capital Crescent Trail's trailhead.
- From 2014 to 19, the Kennedy Center constructed a bridge over the Rock Creek Parkway from the trail to the Kennedy Center, as part of the center's expansion.
- On June 22, 2022, a tunnel opened through the north abutment of the Theodore Roosevelt Bridge, moving the trail from the narrow sidewalk through the parkway underpass.

At some point prior to 2000, NPS constructed a trail connection on Shoreham Hill to Calvert Street, as recommended by the Park Service's 1990 Plan for Paved Recreational Trails of the National Capitol Region (which also recommended adding a new connection at Massachusetts Ave; bypassing the Zoo Tunnel; widening the bridge south of the Zoo; and improving the ramp crossings at P and Pennsylvania) and paved a small parallel trail through Rose Park in Georgetown.

In the NPS's 2016 Paved Trails Study for the National Capitol Region, NPS identified several future improvements to the trail. These included widening the trail along Ohio Dr.; removing the stairs on the south side of the Inlet Bridge to extend the trail south; improving the trail at the Belvedere/Constitution Avenue extension; and creating new trail connections at F St NW and to the new bridge planned for near the railroad bridge.

As part of a rehabilitation of Beach Drive that started on September 22, 2016, part of the trail was rehabilitated. Much of the trail between Shoreham Drive and the Zoo Tunnel was widened to 8–10 feet, repaved and realigned; and the Shoreham Drive crossing, reworked in 2006, was again improved. Work was completed on January 8, 2018.

==== Rehabilitation ====
In March 2021, DDOT began a rehabilitation project on the section of the Parkway Trail from P Street to Shoreham Drive, and to build a new bridge over Rock Creek just south of the Zoo Tunnel. This work had been in planning for years and announced in 2018. The project also included a new connection to the Rose Park Trail and the rehabilitation of that trail. Rehabilitation of the Rose Park Trail was completed on July 2, 2021. During the rehabilitation of the Rock Creek Trail, workers disturbed land that was part of a protected historically black burial ground and work was paused for an archaeological study of two 200-year-old Black cemeteries that the trail might have passed over.

The new bridge over Rock Creek, south of the Zoo Tunnel opened on Oct 7, 2022. The full rehabilitation of the trail south of the Zoo Tunnel was complete on December 7, 2022.

=== Rock Creek Park Trail ===
The Rock Creek Park Trail is a 4.33-mile-long trail from the south entrance of the Zoo Tunnel on the Smithsonian Zoo property to Broad Branch Road in Rock Creek Park.

The trail through Rock Creek Park was first constructed in 1971 along a bridle path dating back to the early 20th century. After the September 1971 experimental closing of a lane of the Rock Creek Parkway for the use of cyclists showed the interests of bike commuters, NPS paved a parallel bridle path from Bluff Bridge, built in 1934, to P Street, NW. It opened on September 23. These first sections of trail were 4 to 8 feet wide with rough pavement, steep slopes, poor visibility and sharp curves. By 1976, the trail was extended to Broad Branch Road, crossing the creek at Bluff Bridge and twice on newly constructed "breakaway" bridges.

NPS continued to make small improvements to the trail. In 1982 they built a new bridge across Rock Creek between Pennsylvania Ave and K Street in conjunction with reconstruction of the roadway bridge. Prior to the project, the trail used a narrow section of the existing bridge. That same year one of the two low-water breakaway bridges just south of Pierce Mill that was washed away by Tropical Storm David in 1979 was replaced with a high water bridge. In 1991 the trail bridge beneath Porter Road, the other low-water breakaway bridge built in the 1970s, was replaced with a high-water bridge.

==== Closing the Gap ====
NPS has long sought a way to close the gap between the park trail, the loop and the section in Maryland. Following a 1973 proposal to extend the trail, NPS launched a study and then announced a plan to do so in 1983, but quickly retracted it. In 1980 NPS, inspired by road closures in New York's Central Park, prepared an assessment of alternatives for a Bicycle Trail Study of the park that analyzed nine alternatives including construction of a new bike trail and alteration of the existing road network. After a period of public comment, NPS proposed expanding the weekend closure; constructing an additional 3.5 miles of trail, designating Beach Drive north of Bingham a bicycle route and studying the suitability of a trail in that section. After years of additional study, public hearings and trial closures, NPS announced in February 1983 a plan to expand weekend closures and close Beach between Joyce and Broad Branch to automobile traffic. At first only one lane of Beach would be closed during rush hour, but after Metro's Red Line opened in Montgomery County in 1985, the section would be permanently closed. Six months later, under pressure from the American Automobile Association and the governments of DC and Montgomery County, NPS decided not to close the section of Beach. Instead, they decided to go ahead with the weekend closures and build a bicycle trail along a horse trail between Joyce and Broad Branch by 1986, but that trail was never built.

The prospect of completing a bike route across the park re-emerged in the 1990s when the Park was required to come up with a General Management Plan. The 1990 Paved Trails plan recommended completing the trail (as well as increasing the clearance below Klingle Road; widening and repaving the trail; adding new connections at Piney Branch and Blagden; and replacing the low-water crossing at Porter). In 1991, a loosely knit, cyclist-dominated group called "Auto-Free DC" renewed the push to ban automobile traffic on Beach Drive. They suggested limited road closures to discourage commuters, but allow access to most locations in the park by car. When NPS failed to take up their suggestion, the group led a series of "rolling road block" protests which aimed to peaceably draw attention to the cause by disrupting rush hour traffic. Nonetheless, the protests led to some confrontations and arrests, and at one point the Military Road Bridge was graffitied with anti-automobile slogans. In 1996 NPS initiated a federally-mandated General Management Plan for the park. In June 1997 NPS laid out several management alternatives, one of which would improve and expand the paved multi-use trails and add a new trail along Wise, with the police substation converted to a visitor center and bicycle rental facility. Another alternative suggested that sections of Beach Drive be permanently closed and converted into a wide multi-use trail and that Wise Road, Sherrill Drive, Bingham Drive, Grant Road, and Blagden Avenue be converted to paved trails. Both of these alternatives were less popular than the status quo. An additional alternative created by the People's Alliance for Rock Creek (PARC), a group consisting of the Washington Area Bicyclists Association, the Sierra Club, Friends of the Earth and 18 other advocacy groups, suggested making Beach Drive auto-free north of Broad Branch as a means of completing the trail envisioned in 1965. In 2003, in an attempt to appease both groups, NPS proposed extending the weekend closures of Beach Drive to weekdays from 9:30 am to 3:30 pm. The proposal was one of several, but was the "preferred alternative." The plan had popular support, but no political support. Mayor Anthony Williams who had supported closure as a candidate, opposed it as mayor, citing the need to evacuate in a post-9/11 world. In May 2004, NPS proposed instead to only close the section from Joyce to Broad Branch, but again found opposition among politicians. So, in November 2005, NPS finalized their management plan which included no further road closures, the prospect of lowering speed limits and adding speed bumps, and improvements to the trail south of Broad Branch. However, speed limits were never reduced and no traffic calming was ever implemented. The 2005 District of Columbia Bicycle Plan only called for "an improved bicycle connection" between Broad Branch and the Maryland line, but, despite this and the Park's management plan, the District's 2013 MoveDC Multi-modal transportation plan proposed a future trail on this section.

==== Rehabilitation ====
Completion of the Management Plan cleared the way for NPS and DDOT to rebuild Beach Drive and the trail. Despite planning that started in 2005, work on the project didn't begin until September 22, 2016. The project rebuilt both Beach Drive and the trail. Much of the trail between the Zoo Tunnel and Broad Branch was widened to 8–10 feet, repaved and realigned; the traffic lanes in the Zoo Tunnel were narrowed to widen the trail through it by 3 feet; a new access to Harvard Street was built and 1000 feet of new trail was constructed between the Porter Street Bridge and Bluff Bridge. In conjunction with the project, the trail through the Klingle Road intersection was redesigned to connect to the new Klingle Valley Trail, built on the washed out section of Klingle Road and opened on June 24, 2017. The work on the trail south of Broad Branch was completed on January 8, 2018.

On March 31, 2021, DDOT began the rehabilitating and expansion of the trail - first announced in 2018 - within both Rock Creek Park and outside of it. Within Rock Creek Park, the project would rehabilitate the Zoo Tunnel bypass (or Zoo Loop), a section between Klingle Ford Footbridge and Bluff Bridge called the Western Ridge Trail and a section on the west side of the creek south of Broad Branch Road. The project also built a new trail along Piney Ridge Road from Beach Drive to Arkansas Avenue. Work on the Western Ridge Trail section was completed in late 2021. The Zoo Loop rehabilitation was completed in 2022 and the trail reopened on Oct 8, 2002. The Piney Branch Trail was opened in 2023, with the intersection with Beach Drive completed in January 2024, and a few other changes at the intersection completed in April 2024.

==== Klingle Valley Trail ====
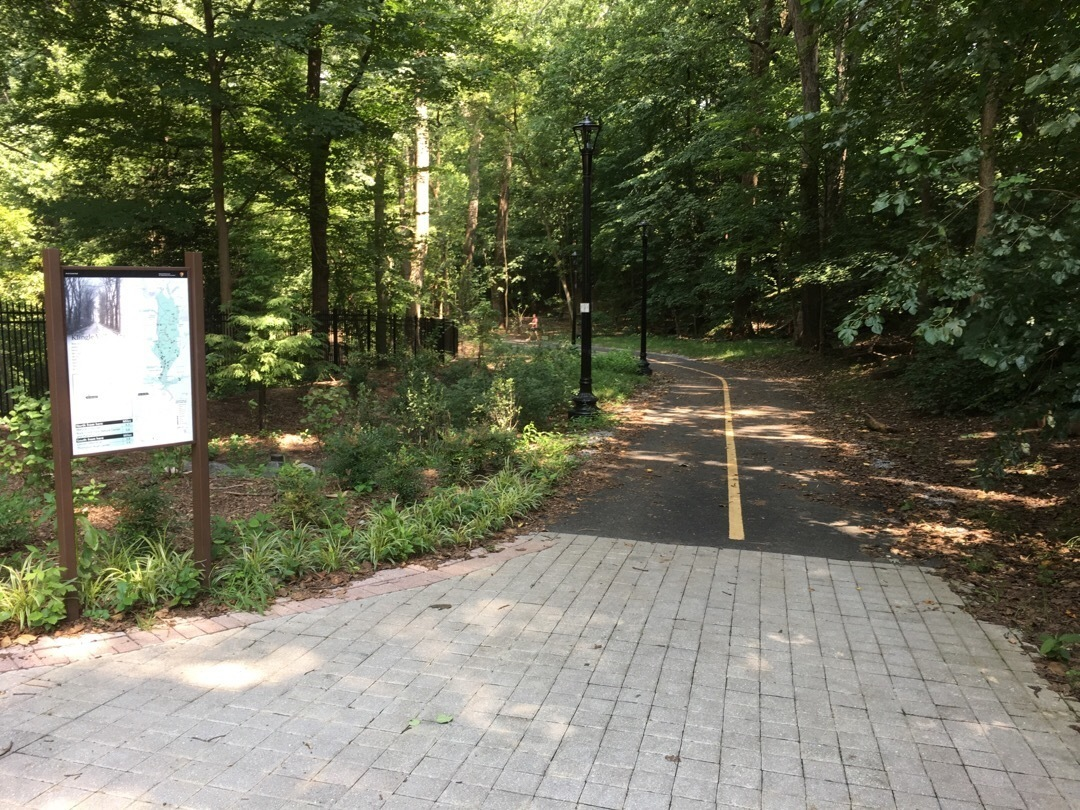
A view of the trail through the Klingle Valley

The Klingle Valley Trail is a 0.7-mile-long trail through the Klingle Valley built on the former right-of-way of Klingle Road along Klingle Creek. It connects the remaining portion of Klingle Road west of Rock Creek to the Rock Creek Trail at Porter Street. The road was closed due to water damage in 1990. After two decades of study and conflicting ideas of what to do with road – restore it or convert it to a trail – the District Council voted in 2008 to convert it to a trail, overruling Mayor Adrian Fenty. Work began in 2015 and was completed in 2017.

=== Rock Creek Loop ===
The Rock Creek Loop is a loop trail in the north part of Rock Creek National Park, it runs along Bingham Dr., Beach Dr., Military Road and Oregon Avenue. The 3.2-mile-long trail system includes spurs to Wise Rd. and the Nature Center.

The system started in January 1967 when NPS announced a plan to build a trail from Military Road to the District boundary. That trail, the first hiker-biker trail in Rock Creek park, was built in the summer of 1967. The crushed bluestone trail was constructed from the Nature Center, past Wise Road to a turnaround loop just southwest of Beach Drive and the DC boundary.

Over the next few months, NPS announced plans to add additional unpaved trails along Military Road from Oregon to Beach, along Wise to Fenwick Branch, beside Fenwick Branch to the District boundary and through Pinehurst Parkway Park (most of which were never constructed). In 1968 they built a second trail along Beach from Joyce to Bingham. By 1969, the two existing northern trails were connected with a trail along Bingham from Oregon to Beach. Later that year, NPS built the final section of the loop along Military between Oregon and Beach. By 1972, NPS had paved all of these trails except the section north of Wise to the DC Boundary. The section along Military Road was originally intended to serve as part of the Fort Circle Trail, passing by Fort DeRussy, but work on the Fort Circle Trail ended in the 1970s with only three parts, the one in Rock Creek, a section of the C&O Canal towpath and another from Fort Stanton to Fort Mahon, completed. Over time, the Rock Creek section ceased to be viewed as part of the Fort Circle Trail system. Between 1979 and 1981, the unpaved trail and turnaround loop north of Wise was abandoned.

As part of a 2016–2019 project to rebuild Beach Drive, the trail along it was widened to 8–10 feet, repaved and realigned. Work on the trail section between Joyce and Bingham was completed on September 27, 2019.

== Maryland ==
=== Rock Creek Stream Valley Trail ===
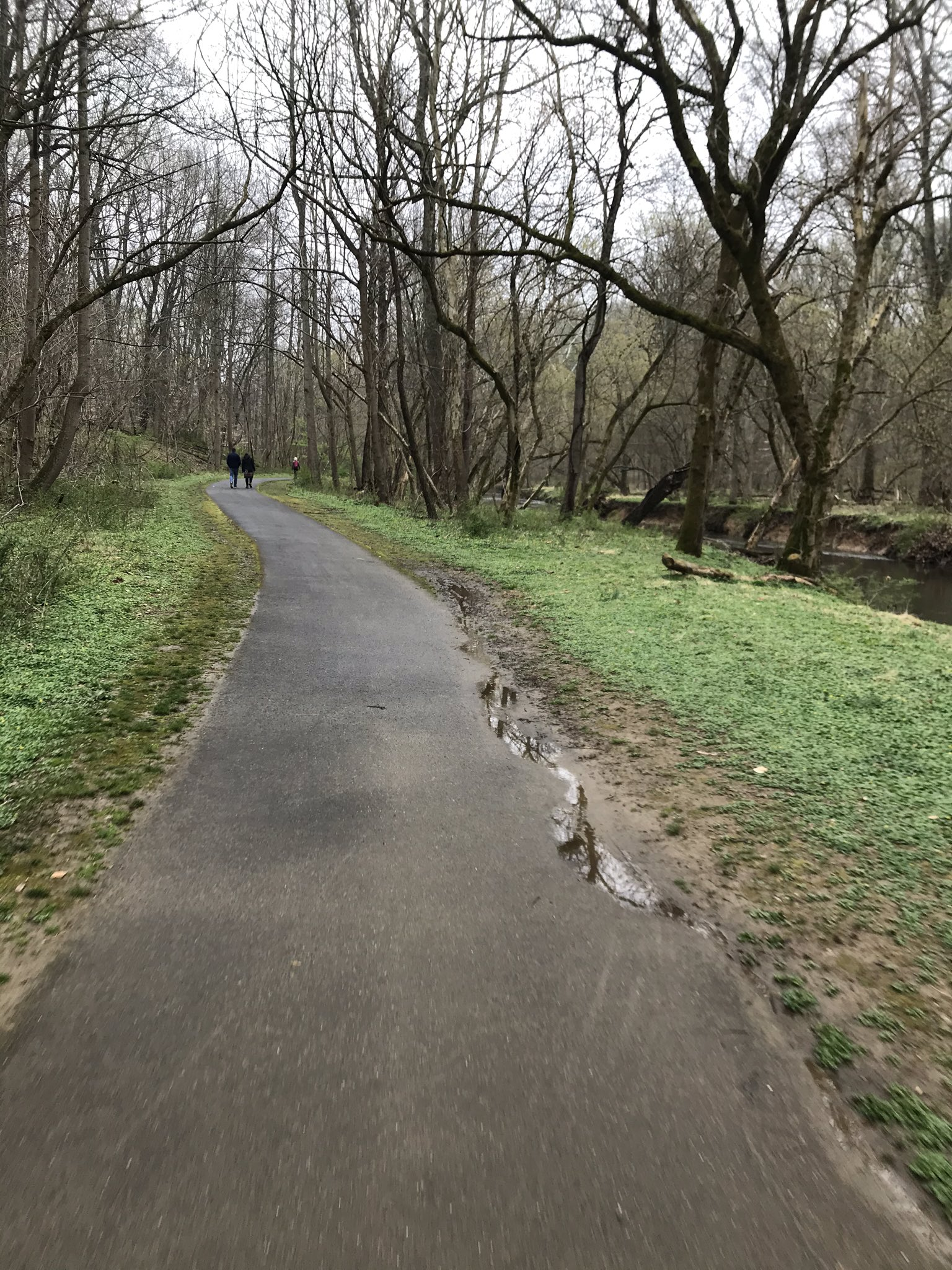
The Rock Creek Stream Valley Trail in the Rock Creek Manor Neighborhood

The Rock Creek Stream Valley Trail is a 14.4-mile-long multi-use trail in Montgomery County, MD from the District boundary to the Lake Needwood Parking lot. It runs through the Rock Creek Stream Valley Park and Rock Creek Regional Park, both purchased and preserved by the National Capital Park Commission starting in the 1920s. A separate trail, the Matthew Henson Trail, follows Turkey Branch Stream, a tributary of Rock Creek, and connects to the Rock Creek Stream Valley Trail. Several other smaller connections have been built to the trail as well.

Other connections were planned. The 1978 Montgomery County Master Plan of Bikeways proposed extending the trail along the North Branch of Rock Creek to Olney-Laytonsville Road and west along a tributary to Woodfield Road. Later plans echoed these in part or in whole and included a spur along Needwood Road; connections to a proposed I-270 trail and the ICC trail; and along Crabbs Branch. These proposals were controversial due to environmental concerns and have not been built.

Planning for the trail began in the late 1960s and faced strong opposition from the same groups who had opposed extending Beach Drive in 1968. In 1971, the Maryland-National Capital Park and Planning Commission (MNCPPC) began experimenting with bicycle-only use of sections of Beach Drive on Sundays similar to what the NPS was doing in Rock Creek Park, in order to build support for the trail. Construction began the following year when MNCPPC opened a fly-ash surfaced trail along Beach Drive in Kensington. That first section of trail ran from the Stoneybrook Road, in Rock Creek Stream Valley Unit 2, to Franklin Street, in unit 3. Ridership on the trail was light, so in 1974 they paved the trail.

Over the next few years, MNCPPC extended the trail. From 1975 to 1977 they extended the trail south to East-West Highway and north to Knowles Avenue with four connections to Parkwood, in Rock Creek Stream Valley unit 4, adding another 3.1 miles. By 1978, it was extended to Wexford Drive. By 1980, it went as far south as Meadowbrook Stables, where it became an unpaved trail to Wise Boulevard in DC. In 1979, MNCPPC began work to extend the trail from Veirs Mill north to Baltimore Road, which was completed by 1981. In 1980, MNCPPC built a connection to Linthicum Street and Edwin Broome Middle School (now Broome Athletic Park). Between 1981 and 1985, the trail section between Wexford Drive and Veirs Mill Road - which replaced a planned extension of Beach Drive north of Garrett Park Road - was constructed. They built two other connections to the east side, at Puller and Clearbrook, in 1984. Between 1985 and 1989 the trail was extended north to Lake Needwood. It was extended 1.2 miles south from East-West Highway to the District boundary by 1998.

Even before the trail was completed, the county began making numerous new connections to the trail. In 1980 the county, with help from NIH and the federal government, built a trail along Elmhirst Parkway to connect the NIH hospitals to the trail. In 1981, the planning board authorized three new connections to the section of trail between Veirs Mill and Baltimore Roads; one to Oriental Street, one to Russett Street and one to Greenspan Lane at Drake Drive Park. None of these were constructed until sometime between 1994 and 2009. In 1987, the National Capitol Planning Commission approved connections to Weymouth Road, Saul Road and along Beach and Grovesnor to Rockville Pike, but only the latter two were built. The connection to Weymouth had faced opposition from residents of Bethesda's Parkside Condominiums since it was first proposed in 1983, and had to be rerouted to avoid wetlands, but despite the rerouting it was never built. In 2008, developers of the old National Park Seminary constructed trail connections from Ament Street and Stephen Sitter Avenue to the "Ireland Trail", which predated the Rock Creek Stream Valley Trail and connected the Seminary to the Creek via Ireland Creek. On July 23, 2011, Montgomery County Parks and the Maryland State Highway Administration opened the $5.8 million trail bridge over Veirs Mill that had been in planning since at least 2004. In the same year they completed the Ceder Lane Bridge reconstruction project, which included a trail connection between the Stream Valley Trail and the Bethesda Trolley Trail via the Elmhirst Parkway Trail. In 2016 the County started work on the Twinbrook Connector, a 4500 foot long connector trail between the trail near Veirs Mill Road and Rock Creek Mill Road, but ran out of funding before completing it. They plan to complete it in the future.

From the opening of the Georgetown Branch Trail in 1997 to the completion of the Rock Creek Trestle in 2003, the section between Susanna Lane and Freyman Drive served as the interim Georgetown Branch Trail.

In 2007, a section of trail was repaved from East-West Highway to just north of the newly repaired Capital Crescent Trail trestle. The retaining wall under the CCT trestle was also rebuilt, to improve the choke point at the curve directly below the trestle by increasing the sight distance.

In 2021, Montgomery County began the work of replacing the Beach Drive Bridge over Silver Creek just east of Kensington Parkway. The trail had used the wide sidewalk on that bridge to cross Silver Creek, but the project moved the trail north and created a new trail bridge over the creek along with a widened and improved trail.

=== Upper Rock Creek Trail ===
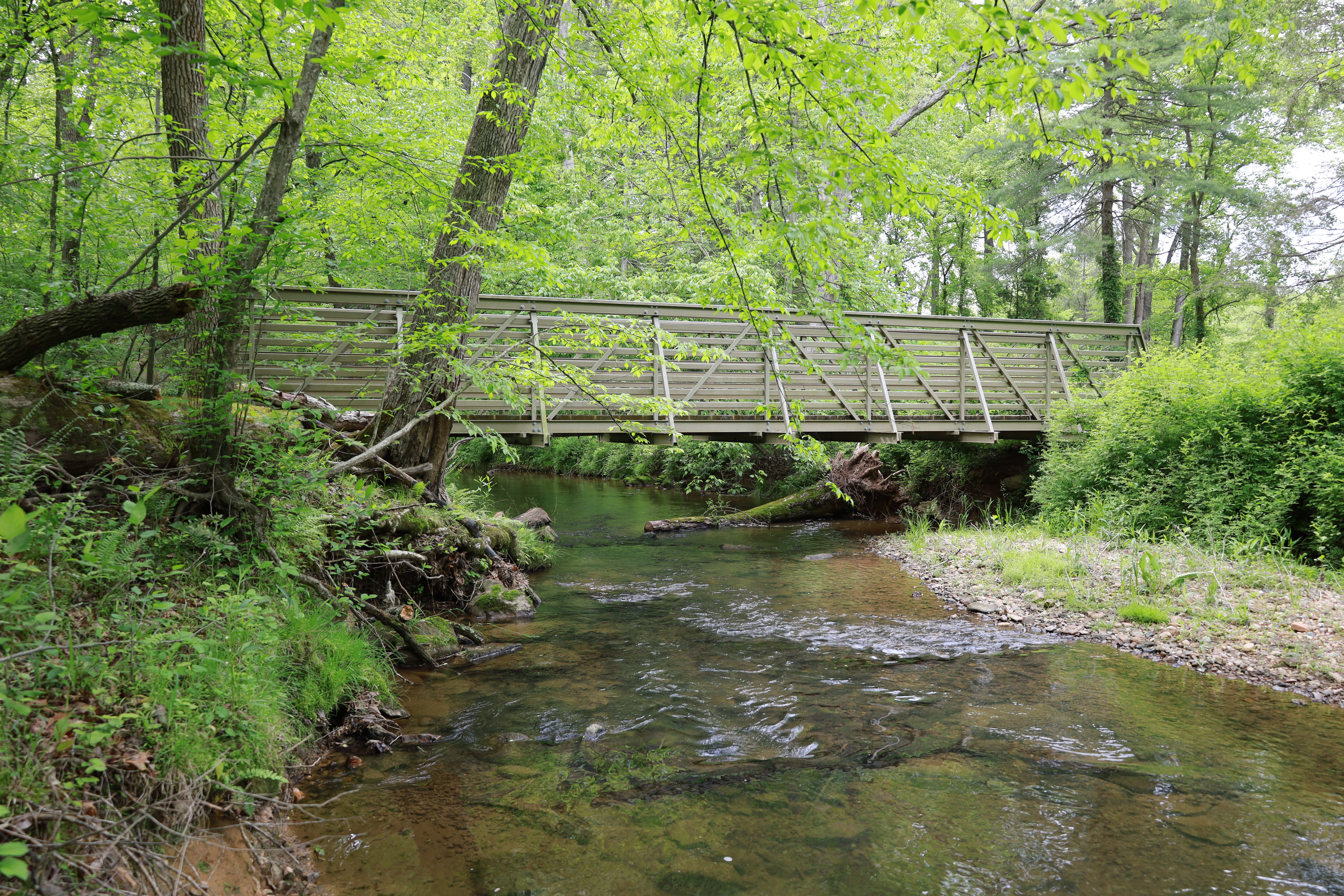
Upper Rock Creek Trail crossing Rock Creek near the Muncaster Mill Road intersection

The Upper Rock Creek Trail begins at the northern entrance to Rock Creek Regional Park near the Needwood Road crossing of Lake Needwood. It travels upstream, passes through Agricultural History Farm Park, and ends at Olney Laytonsville Road.

== Connecting trails ==
=== North Branch Trail ===
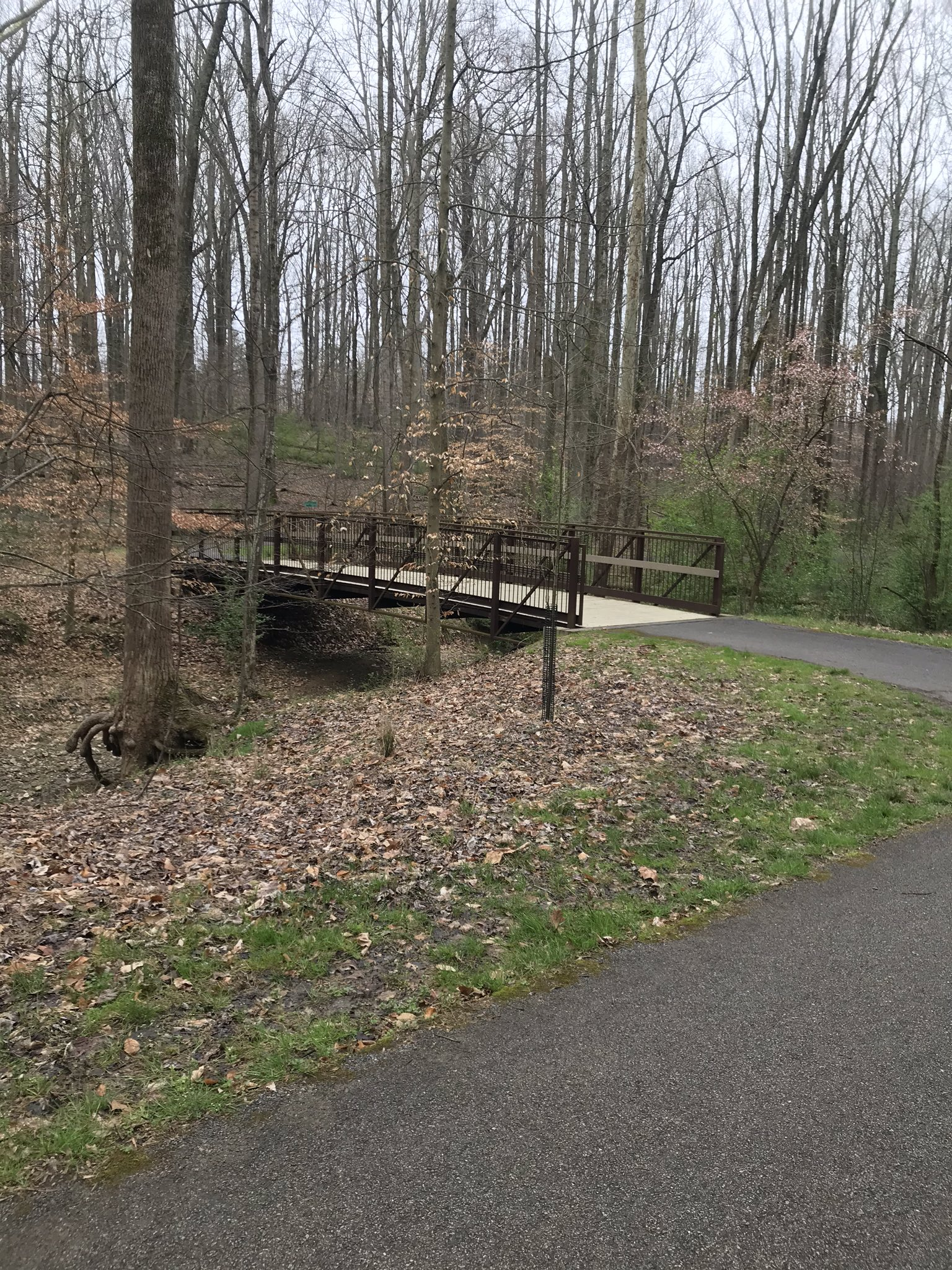
The North Branch Connector Trail in Rockville, MD

The North Branch Trail is a partially constructed trail along the North Branch of Rock Creek from the Rock Creek Stream Valley Trail to the ICC Trail and on to Olney, MD. A connector from the Rock Creek Stream Valley Trail to Lake Frank, the Lakeside Trail, trails along Muncaster Mill and Emory Lanes, the ICC Trail and trails within North Branch Stream Valley Park form the existing portions of the North Branch Trail. The trail was first proposed as part of the 1978 Montgomery County Bicycle Masters Plan and repeated in several plans since then. It will ultimately extend from the Rock Creek Stream Valley to the Olney-Laytonsville Road.

Within North Branch Stream Valley Park the North Branch Trail runs parallel to the natural surface Kengla Trail. Both make up a significant portion of the 13-mile long Mid County Loop.

The first section of the trail to be constructed was the 1.6-mile-long "Wickham Road Bike Path", (part side-path and partially on-road) in Olney which was constructed in 2002. It connected Olney-Laytonsville Road to the trails planned along the North Branch as part of the Norbeck Grove development, which were constructed shortly thereafter.. The mostly-paved Norbeck Grove Bike Path extends 1.8 miles from Bowie Mill Road to Olney Mills Road with connections to Wickham Road in 3 places, including the Wickham Road Bike Path; Rushbrooke Drive; Tothill Drive; Weston Place and Brightwood Road. A natural surface North Branch Trail connects to the paved trail just south of Rushbrooke Drive and follows the North Branch north to Muncaster Road where it connects to the Upper Rock Creak Trail.

In 2016–17 a 1.8-mile-long section of trail located north of the ICC on Park and Planning property was constructed as part of the Preserve at Rock Creek project. It includes connections to Harbinger Road and Heartwood Drive.

Montgomery County plans to build a small connection from the Preserve at Rock Creek trail section under the ICC to the ICC Trail, and a bridge across the North Branch at the ICC to be part of the natural surface Kengala Trail. As of March 2021, work on the connection was to start in Fall 2021 and complete in Summer of 2023, but the project was delayed. The County approved funding in 2026 and construction was anticipated to start in September 2026.

The Bowie Mill Local Park section between the Preserve at Rock Creek and Bowie Mill Road, meanwhile, is in the 2016 Countywide Park Trails Plan as a future project, but there is no design or schedule for this section. A natural surface trail between the two does exist.

=== Upper Rock Creek Trail ===
The Upper Rock Creek Trail is a 5.5 mile long natural surface trail running north from Lake Needwood along Rock Creek and one of its tributaries to Muncaster Road just south of Olney Laytonsville Road. It passes through the Rock Creek Stream Valley Park and the Agricultural History Farm Park in Laytonsville, MD.

==== Lakeside Trail ====
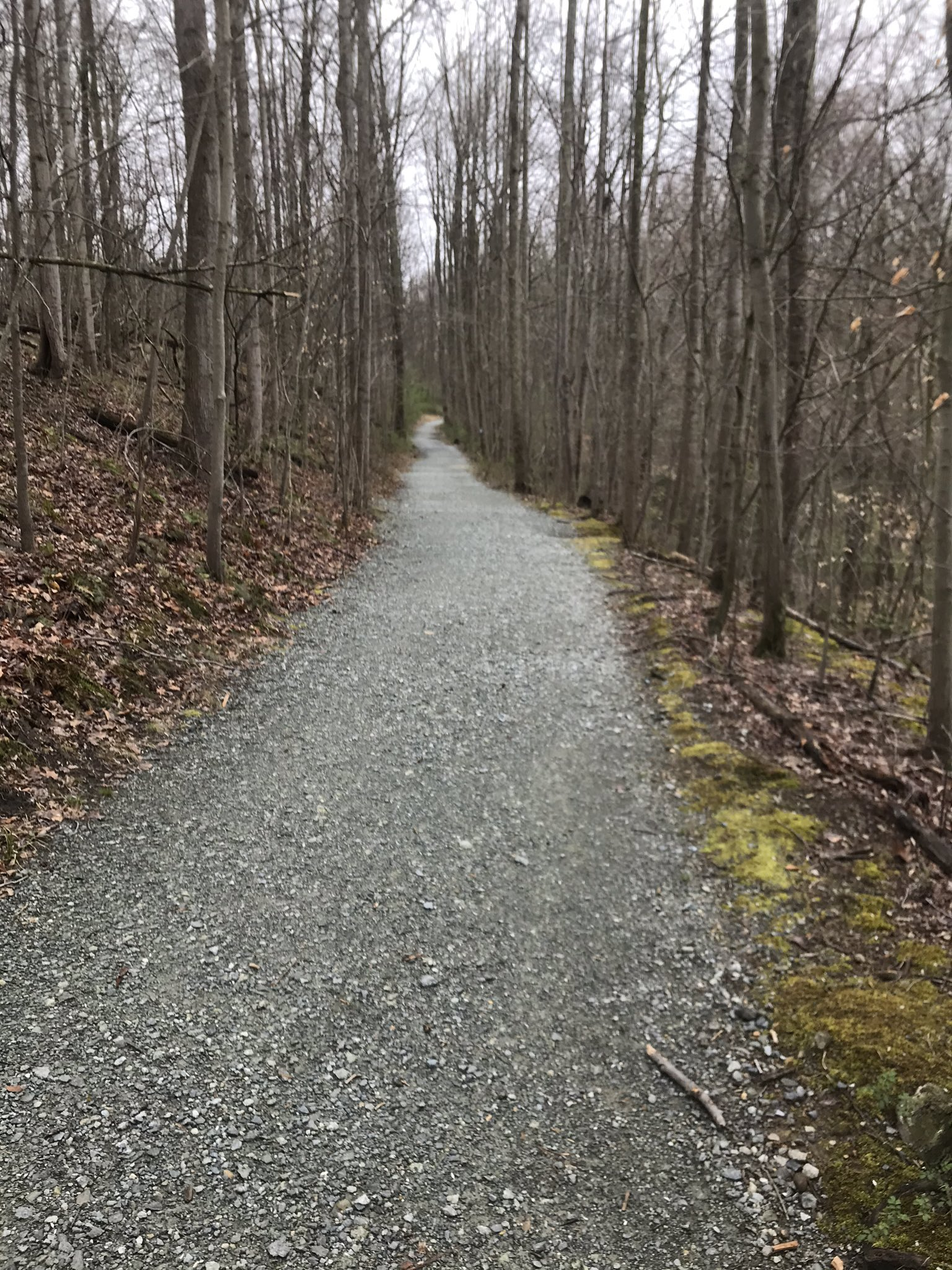
The unpaved Lake Side Trail next to Lake Frank in Maryland

The Lakeside Trail is a trail system along the south and east side of Lake Bernard Frank, with a connector to the Rock Creek Stream Valley Trail. It consists of 1.8 miles of paved trail and another 1.1 miles of shared-use natural surface trail. The Lakeside trail stretches from the Avery Road trailhead, around the lake and then north to Muncaster Mill Road with a connection to Trailway Drive. The northernmost section is unpaved.

MNCPPC constructed the trail in the early 1980s and then connected it to the Rock Creek Trails in 2012. The county constructed a half-mile (0.8 km) long trail to connect it to the Rock Creek Stream Valley Trail as part of the ICC mitigation program. Preliminary design work on the connector trail began in 2006 when it was selected for funding by the Compensatory Mitigation and Environmental Stewardship fund for the Inter-County Connector (ICC). After a year-long controversy, during which the Manor Lake Civic Association fought the connector trail on grounds that a "bike highway" would drastically change the area around the lake, work began in 2010 and was completed in 2012. The connector was built atop an existing hiking trail.

Montgomery County is planning to build an additional extension of this trail. Planning began in 2005 and the design was approved in 2017. The project would've extended the paved trail north - at times using an existing abandoned road alignment, bridge the North Branch and connect with Muncaster Mill Road at both the east end of the existing Muncaster Mill Bikeway and near the intersection with Emory Road. As of March 2024, the project was in limbo.

=== Muncaster Mill and Emory Road Bikeways ===
The Muncaster Mill and Emory Road Bikeways might someday connect the North Branch trail to the ICC Trail.

A 0.7-mile section of the Muncaster Mill Road bikeway from Avery Road to Meadowside Lane was constructed by the county between 2002 and 2008 when the road was redesigned following a fatal bus crash. The bikeway was extended west to the ICC Trail when that trail opened in July 2011. Montgomery County had plans in 2021 to extend the North Branch Trail along two paths, with one of them ending at the eastern terminus of this bikeway but that plan was delayed when bids came in higher than expected.

Montgomery County built a bikeway along Emory Lane between Georgia Avenue and Holly Ridge Lane between 2005 and 2008 and in 2011 it was connected to the ICC Trail. In 2023 the Emory Lane/Muncaster Mill Shared Use Bikepath opened. It extended the Emory Lane bikepath south to Muncaster Mill and then east to the edge of Rock Creek Regional Park. It is to be connected to the Lakeside Trail by a path from the current Lakeside Trail but that project, also part of the North Branch Trail project, was also delayed by high costs. After working with the state, the County created a new funding plan and if that is approved, work could begin in 2026.

=== ICC Trail ===
The section of the ICC Trail, from Muncaster Mill Road to Emory Lane, that serves as part of the North Branch Trail opened on July 30, 2011. The section is 1.4 miles long, crosses the North Branch and runs directly adjacent to Maryland Route 200. With it, connections to both the Muncaster Mill Road and Emory Lane bikeways were created.

=== Matthew Henson Trail ===
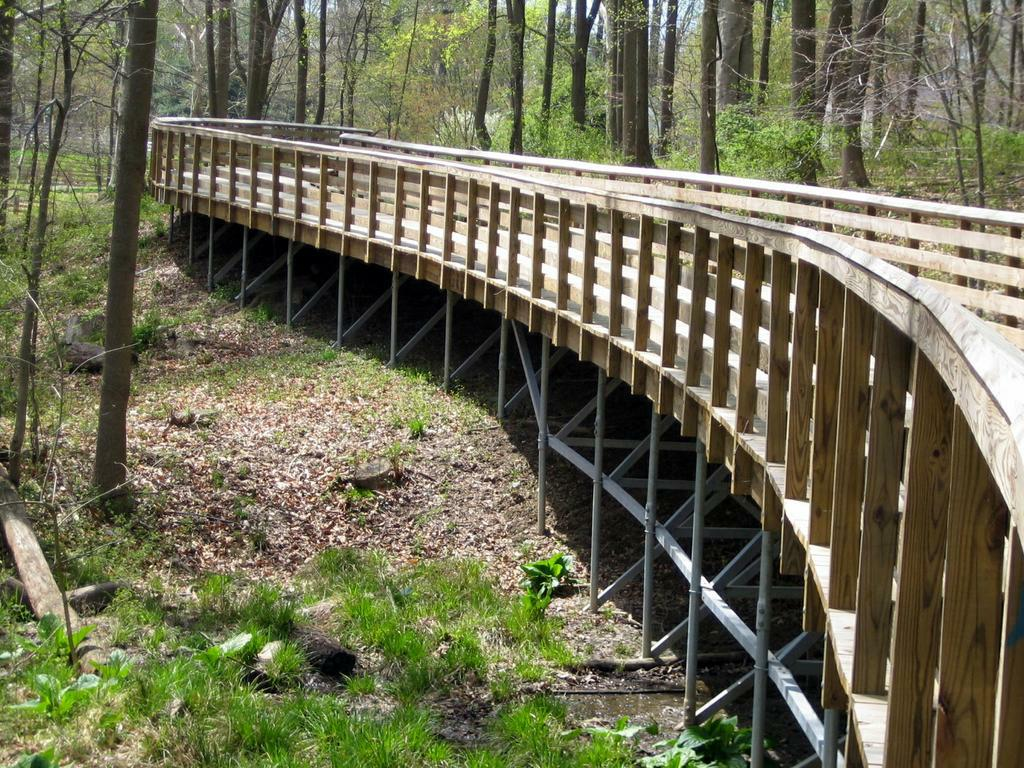
Boardwalk section of Matthew Henson Trail

The Matthew Henson Trail is a 4.2-mile-long paved trail through Matthew Henson State Park from Rock Creek to Alderton Road in Silver Spring along a corridor originally intended to serve as a highway. It starts out following Turkey Branch but then crosses over to the Anacostia Basin, crossing over Bel Pre Creek and ending near the Northwest Branch of the Anacostia River. It includes multiple connections near Bel Pre Neighborhood Park and Layhill Village Neighborhood Park.

== See also ==
- Capital Crescent Trail
- Matthew Henson Trail
- Maryland Route 200
- Civil War Defenses of Washington
