= List of rivers of Washington =

List of rivers of Washington may refer to:

- List of rivers of Washington (state)
- List of rivers of Washington, D.C.
