= Lake Bernard Frank =

Reservoir in Derwood, Maryland, United States

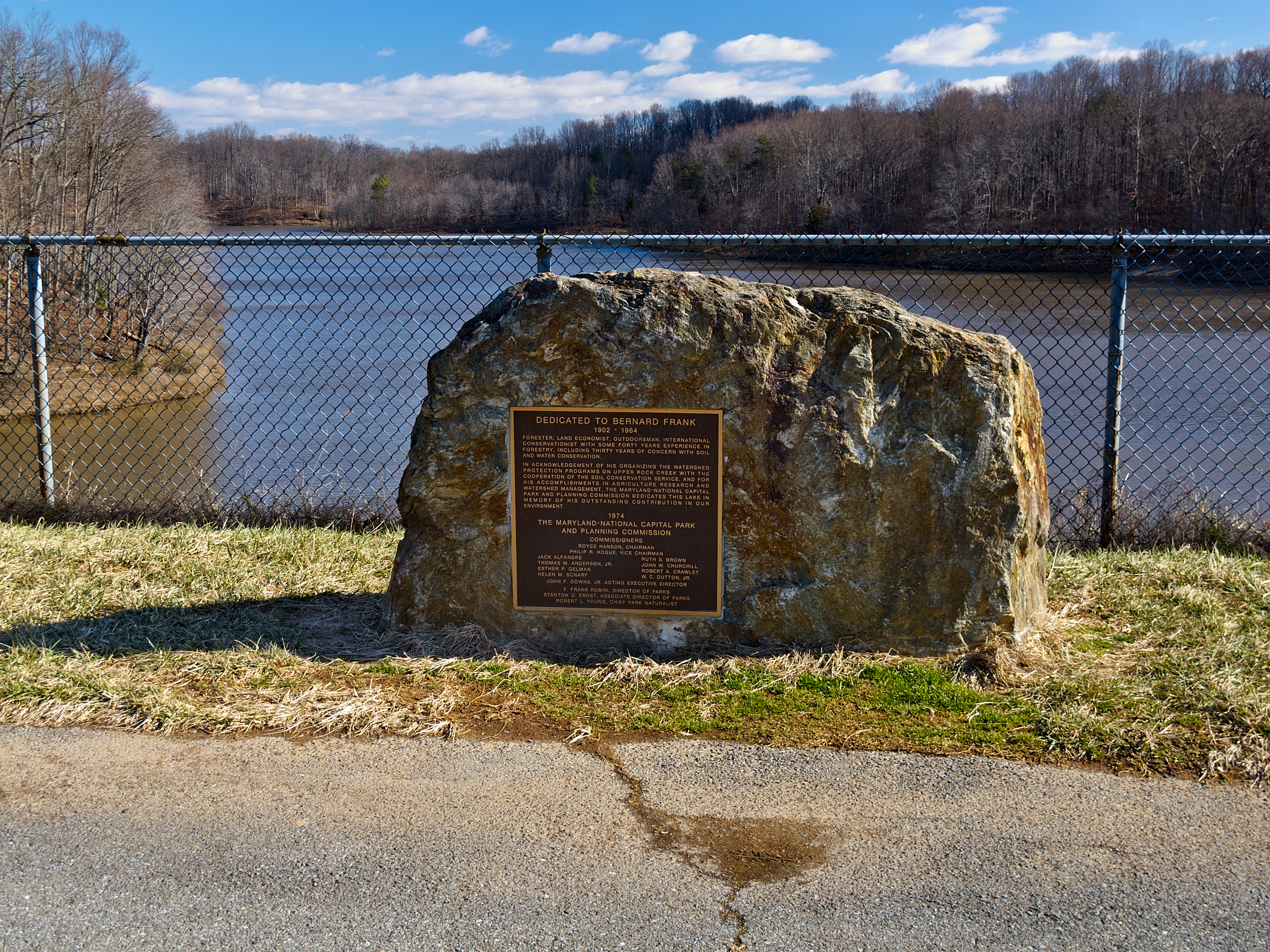
- Dedication stone at Lake Bernard Frank

- Location within Maryland Location within the United States
- Location: Derwood, Maryland
- Coordinates: 39°06′23″N 77°06′48″W
- Type: reservoir
- Primary inflows: North Branch of Rock Creek (Potomac River)
- Primary outflows: North Branch of Rock Creek (Potomac River)
- Catchment area: 12.2 sq mi (32 km^{2})
- Basin countries: United States
- Managing agency: Montgomery Parks, M–NCPPC
- Built: 1966
- Construction engineer: Natural Resources Conservation Service
- Max. length: 0.85 mi (1.37 km)
- Max. width: 950 ft (290 m)
- Surface area: 54 acres (22 ha)
- Average depth: 12.8 ft (3.9 m)
- Max. depth: 26.5 ft (8.1 m)
- Water volume: 233,000,000 US gal (880,000 m^{3})
- Surface elevation: 299 feet (91 m)
- Website: www.montgomeryparks.org?p=7127

Lake Bernard Frank (also Lake Frank), is a 54-acre (220,000 m^{2}) reservoir on the North Branch of Rock Creek in Derwood, Maryland, U.S., just east of Rockville. In the late 1960s it was renamed after Bernard Frank, a wilderness activist and a co-founder of The Wilderness Society. The lake's boundaries are, approximately, Route 28, East Gude Drive, Avery Road, and Muncaster Mill Road. Lake Frank was created in 1966 as Lake Norbeck to aid in flood and sediment control, as well as to provide recreation. It has an earthen dam, installed in 1967, on its southern side. It was created as a sister lake to Lake Needwood. Lake Frank is owned by the Maryland-National Capital Park and Planning Commission (M–NCPPC).

The lake's secluded location within Rock Creek Regional Park is another of its assets. Visitors to the lake must bike or walk about 1/4 of a mile from all parking lots to get to the lakeshore. The Lake Frank & Meadowside Trails surround the lake, making it a favorite hiking spot. Also, locals enjoy fishing from the shoreline, though a license is needed to do so. However, swimming, boating, and ice skating are prohibited.

The main trail around Lake Frank, the Lakeside Trail, is a 3 1/4 mile long loop. Approximately 2/3 of the trail is unpaved and traverses the woods surrounding the lake. The other part of the trail is wider and paved. At the approximate half-way point of the trail, there is a creek that must be crossed. Though there are a group of rocks which form a bridge-like path across, the creek may be impassable depending on the water level.

== Water quality ==
In 1998, the Maryland Department of the Environment (MDE) identified Lake Frank as "impaired by nutrients" on its list of impaired surface waters. Eutrophic conditions in the lake were described at that time, evidenced by excessive algal growth and low dissolved oxygen levels. In 2002, MDE prepared a report based on more recent monitoring data which indicated improved conditions. The 2002 report proposed that the lake be removed from the impairment listing.

In 2017-2019, the Maryland-National Capital Park and Planning Commission warned of the lake water contamination with microcystin. Microcystin is a toxic substance produced by some species of blue-green algae (cyanobacteria) and is toxic to the liver.
