= Pope Branch =

Coordinates: 38.878723°N 76.971642°W

Location
- Country: United States
- Federal district: District of Columbia

Physical characteristics
- Mouth
  - location: Anacostia River
- Length: 1 mi (1.6 km)
- Basin size: 0.4 mi^{2} (1.0 km^{2})

Pope Branch is a tributary stream of the Anacostia River in Washington, DC, United States. The headwaters of the stream originate near Fort Davis Drive, and the branch flows roughly northwest for about 1 mile (1.6 km) to the Anacostia, which drains to the Potomac River and the Chesapeake Bay. The watershed area of Pope Branch is about 0.4 square miles (1.0 km^{2}).

== Water quality issues ==
Pope Branch is in a highly urbanized area and the stream has been polluted by urban runoff (stormwater) and leaking sewer pipes.

The District of Columbia Department of Energy and Environment has conducted stream restoration projects in Pope Branch Park. Regenerative stormwater conveyances were installed to capture runoff from adjacent streets. The restoration work is designed to reduce erosion and pollutant discharges to the stream.

The District of Columbia Water and Sewer Authority (DC Water) completed repairs on the sewer line in 2014. It began stream restoration in the sewer line area in January 2016 and the work was scheduled for completion in October 2016.

== See also ==
- List of District of Columbia rivers
