= Twinbrook (Rockville, Maryland) =

- Subdivision
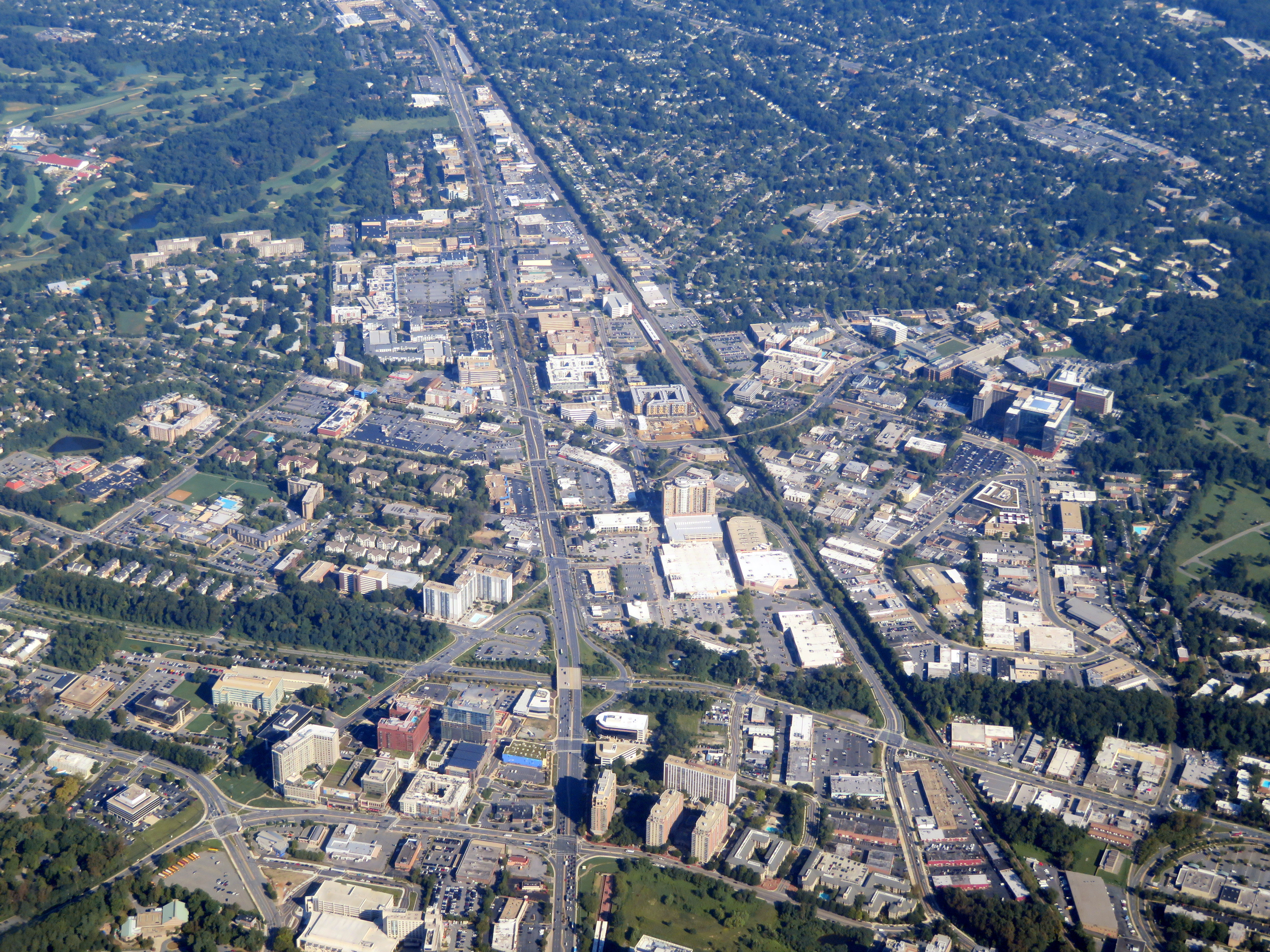
- Aerial view of Twinbrook in September 2018

- Location within Maryland
- Coordinates: 39.0746°N 77.12°W
- Country: United States
- State: Maryland
- County: Montgomery
- City: Rockville
- Established: October 18, 1946
- Founder: Joseph L. Geeraert, Roland Simmon, Wesley Sauter, and Donald Gingery

Area
  - Land: 2.36 sq mi (6.1 km^{2})
- Elevation: 341 ft (104 m)

Population
  - Estimate (2010): 15,000
- Zip Code: 20851, 20852
- Area codes: 301, 240, 227

Twinbrook is a large residential subdivision in the city of Rockville, Maryland. The name Twinbrook or Twin-Brook came from the four developers, Joseph L. Geeraert, Roland Simmon, Wesley Sauter, and Donald Gingery, who originally established the new subdivision on October 18, 1946. The name was a reference to the two streams that traversed the original 200 acres of the development, both eventually feeding into Rock Creek, which is the namesake feature of Rock Creek Park, a unit of the National Park Service.

The older south section of Twinbrook is roughly bounded by First Street on the west, Veirs Mill Road on the north, Halpine Road and Twinbrook Parkway on the east and the B&O railroad and Washington Metropolitan Area Transit Authority tracks to the southwest. And, with some exceptions, the smaller north section is bounded by Veirs Mill Road to the south, Old Broadwood to the west, Old Baltimore Road to the North and Twinbrook Parkway to the east.

== History ==
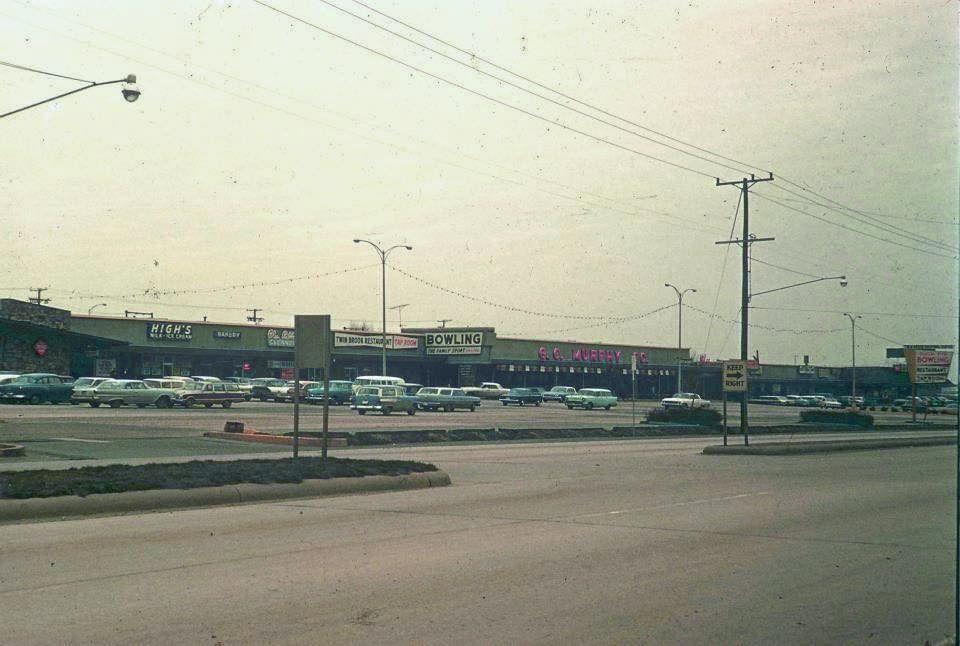
Twinbrook in 1959

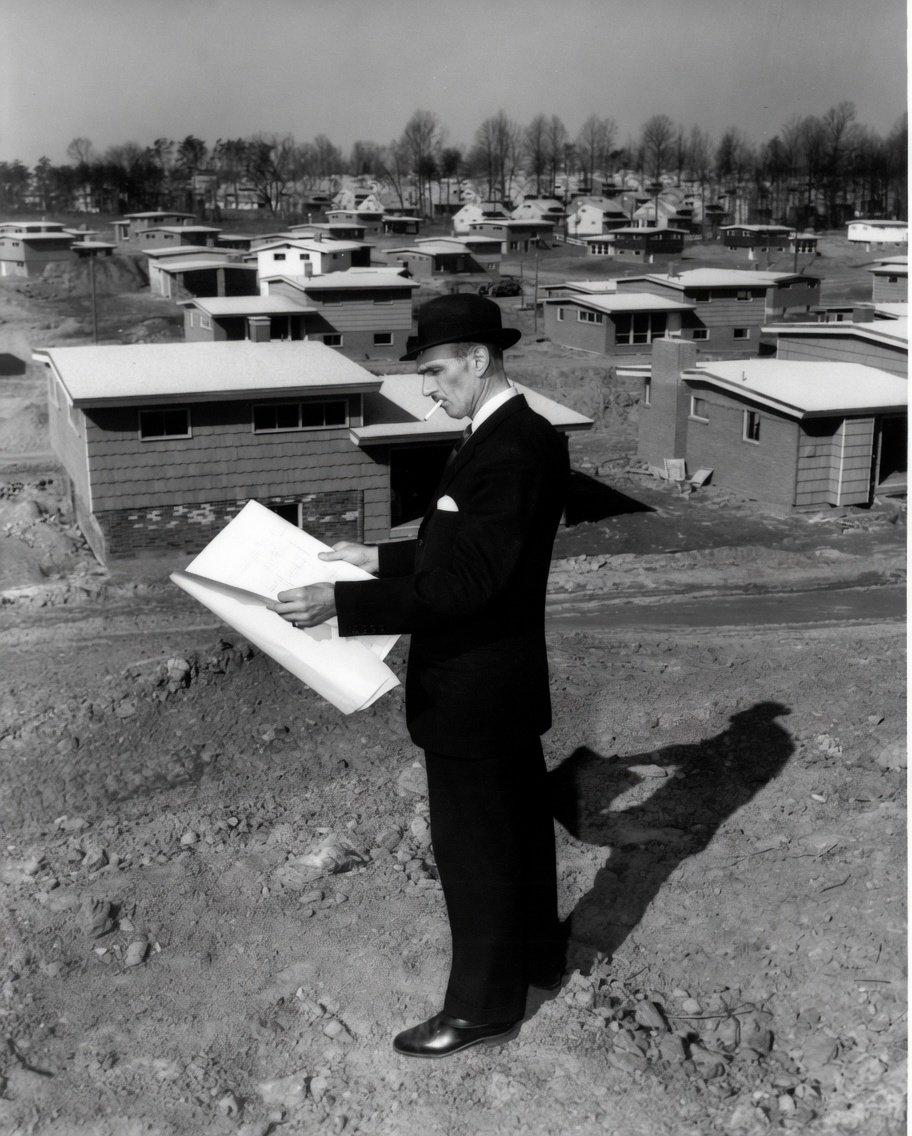
The father of Twinbrook, Joseph Geeraert standing on a hill in 1966 above rows of newly-constructed homes at the new neighborhood he developed; it is a large neighborhood of affordable single family homes in Rockville.

=== Pre-subdivision ===
Though originally home to Native American tribes, by the early 18th century the land that now makes up Twinbrook was being provided as land grants to individuals who performed services respective to the Great Britain or through early purchases and donations. Including Caleb Litton who settled the Autrey Park area and later local tavern owner Adam Robb, who would acquire most of the current Twinbrook area. In 1873 John Hillaery Bogley purchased around 200 acres of the land that Adam Robb had acquired and subsequently in 1925 Washington, DC native Lillian M. Small purchased the land from Bogley's heirs, which was described as having come from Litton's original grant from Lord Baltimore around 1720. While Small never permanently lived at the farm, she did frequently visit and spend time there before selling it to the Twinbrook developers for $94,000.

=== Creation ===
In the years following World War II it became obvious that affordable homes were needed to meet the needs of the influx of young families the peace years had created. This need was especially noteworthy in the suburbs of Washington, DC, a city that had rapidly expanded during the war years. To meet this need, Twinbrook developers Geeraert and Gingery looked to the planned communities of Levittown, New York and Oak Ridge, Tennessee for guidance and incorporated the ideas of Frank Lloyd Wright's Usonian homes, which were simple and affordable but comfortable and technologically advanced homes. Additionally, the lots and streets were designed to respect that natural topography of the area, resulting in irregular lot sizes and curving streets.

The first section of Twinbrook to be developed was the area south of Veirs Mill Road, with construction starting shortly after the original 1946 purchase of the property and the first owners taking possession of their home in September 1948. In a nod to the World War II veterans who would largely occupy the homes, the names of the streets of the southern section were largely taken from World War II engagements and related locations. There were multiple styles of homes in the development, though the most readily identified were the Cape Cod style homes identified as the "Famous Five" in the initial marketing and all featured large picture windows and finished first floors and unfinished second stories, which lowered the price for buyers and allowed them to finish the upstairs space to their own specifications.

The homes were initially offered at prices ranging from $9,250 to $11,500 and the government backed the mortgages 100 percent. Veterans were able to purchase a home with only a $50 down payment. By 1952 more than 300 houses had been built and in 1949 Rockville officially annexed Twinbrook into the city. Twinbrook, like other local residential developments, included racial restrictive covenants between 1947 and 1949. These covenants, designed to keep racial minorities from owning property in the neighborhood, fell in line with language from the Federal Housing Association, which encouraged or even required racial covenants in communities. The Federal Housing Association removed the language in December 1949 and by the 1950s Twinbrook's racial restrictive covenants had disappeared.

=== Twinbrook Forest ===
By 1952 Joseph Geeraert saw that build-out of the initial south section of Twinbrook was about to be reached, so he introduced his Twinbrook Forest addition in the section on the north side of Veirs Mill. Using similar designs and layouts, the second Twinbrook development proved to be an equally successful venture.

== Amenities ==
=== Schools ===
Filling one of the most urgent needs of the new community, an eight-room Twinbrook Elementary School opened in 1952, with an additional 12 classrooms added the following year and more than doubling the capacity to 550 students. And Meadow Hall Elementary School, which serves the Twinbrook Forest area opened in 1956. Additionally, Edwin W. Broome Junior High School (later Broome Middle School) was constructed in the Twinbrook Forest area to serve the larger subdivision. High school students attended Richard Montgomery High School, Robert E. Peary High School, and, starting in 1968, Rockville High School.

=== Shopping ===
Twinbrook Mart was the first retail center built to directly serve the residents of the subdivision. Built on the south side of Veirs Mill Road near the intersection of Atlantic Avenue in 1956, it originally included an A&P grocery store, Peoples Drug Store and other retail establishments. The Twinbrook Library, a branch of Montgomery County Public Libraries, was initially housed in the basement of the drugstore starting in 1959, it would be 1976 before the community library would move across Veirs Mill Road into its current stand-alone building.

In 1958 the Twinbrook Shopping Center, located on the opposite side of Veirs Mill Road from the Twinbrook Mart would open. This second center more than doubled the retail space for the community and its opening even featured future United States Vice President Hubert Humphrey.

=== Recreation ===
Shortly after residents began settling into the Twinbrook subdivision, the need for recreational amenities developed. The Twinbrook Swimming Pool was among the first and most popular of these amenities. Opened in 1955, the pool was literally dug by volunteers who actually lived in the community on formerly church-owned land that Catholic Archbishop Patrick A. O’Boyle had generously sold to the Twinbrook Swimming Pool Corporation for $10. At its peak, membership at the pool was around 700 families. Today it is about half that, but it remains a popular place.

Twinbrook Park, now Twinbrook Community Recreation Center, was originally established as a green space with limited amenities in 1953, but in the decades since it has greatly expanded, adding basketball courts, tennis courts and a children's playground. And in 1999 the city built a new building to house the recreation center, a space large enough to hold a community room, gym, exercise room, and computer lab.

== Transportation ==
Though the subdivision came to life at the dawn of the golden age of the automobile, public transit was still an important to help the influx of families get around and to work, which often included commuting into Washington, DC. Though street car service between Rockville and Georgetown ended in 1935, bus service to the Twinbrook neighborhood was established in the early 1950s and the 1980s saw a major advancement for public transit as the Metro system was extended out into the Maryland suburbs.

On December 15, 1984, the Twinbrook Metro stop opened for general use. It was part of a seven-mile expansion of Metro's Red Line northwest of the Grosvenor-Strathmore stop, which had opened on July 25, 1984. This new metro stop, located near the southwestern edge of the subdivision, greatly improved the accessibility of living in Twinbrook.

== Today ==
Following several years of flux, with home values not keeping pace with the majority of Rockville's neighborhoods, the last decade has seen improvement in the subdivision, as more families are turning to the neighborhood for relatively affordable single-family homes. The owner to renter ratio has shifted back in favor of owner-occupied homes and the development around the Twinbrook Metro stop is also spurring increased interest in the 60+ year old subdivision.

The major redevelopment taking place at the Twinbrook Metro station will include replacing the large, underutilized parking lots attached to the station and replacing them with Metro parking structures and high-density retail and residential development in the essence a town square. Some development has already taken place, for additional slated for the near future. Additionally, the revitalization of the dated and somewhat degraded Twinbrook Mart and Twinbrook Shopping Center retail developments on Veirs Mill Road has also been planned.
