= List of rivers of Washington, D.C. =

This is a list of rivers and creeks of Washington, D.C., the capital of the United States.

- Anacostia River
- Barnaby Run
- Bennings Branch (historical)
- Bingham Run
- Broad Branch
- Davis Branch (historical)
- Deep Branch (historical)
- Duck Creek (historical)
- Dumbarton Oaks
- Fenwick Branch
- Fletchers Run
- Fort Chaplin Tributary
- Fort Dupont Tributary
- Fort Stanton Tributary
- Foundry Branch
- Gallatin Run
- Gillam Branch (historical)
- Hickey Run
- James Creek (historical)
- Klingle Run
- Lost Stream
- Lower Beaverdam Creek
- Luzon Branch
- Maddox Branch
- Melvin Hazen Valley Branch
- Milkhouse Run
- Nash Run
- Normanstone Creek
- Oxon Creek
- Oxon Run
- Pinehurst Branch
- Piney Branch
- Piney Run
- Pope Branch
- Portal Branch
- Potomac River
- Reedy Branch (historical)
- Rock Creek
- Soapstone Branch
- Stickfoot Branch
- Texas Avenue Tributary
- Tiber Creek (Goose Creek)
- Watts Branch
- Winkle Doodle Run

== See also ==
- Boundary Channel
- Chesapeake and Ohio Canal
- Washington Channel
- Washington City Canal
