= Hickey Run =

Coordinates: 38.908142°N 76.957469°W

Location
- Country: United States
- Federal district: District of Columbia

Physical characteristics
- Mouth
  - location: Anacostia River
- Length: 2.3 mi (3.7 km)
- Basin size: 2.08 mi^{2} (5.4 km^{2})

Hickey Run is a tributary stream of the Anacostia River in Washington, D.C.

== Course ==
The historic headwaters of the stream originate in the Langdon area in Northeast Washington (in the southwest corner of the Langdon Park Community/Recreation Center), however at present this portion of the stream and its tributaries are enclosed in underground pipes and culverts. The daylight portion of the stream can be seen south of New York Avenue, in the National Arboretum, and the stream continues southeast about 1 mile (1.6 km) to the Anacostia, which drains to the Potomac River and the Chesapeake Bay. The watershed area of Hickey Run is about 2.08 mi^{2} (5.4 km^{2}).

In the 19th century, before urbanization, the stream network consisted of the Hickey Run main stem and 15 tributaries, totaling over 5 miles (8.0 km). Today there are 6 tributaries along with the main stem, totaling 2.3 mi (3.7 km).

== Water pollution ==
Hickey Run is in a highly urbanized area and its water quality has been rated as poor by government agencies. The watershed has a large amount of impervious surfaces, which along with the piped tributaries, has led to large amounts of urban runoff (stormwater) pollution in the stream, including oil and grease, and bacteria. The D.C. Department of the Environment has ongoing monitoring and public education activities for Hickey Run, and has plans for stream restoration projects. Other agencies assisting in Hickey Run improvements include the Anacostia Watershed Restoration Partnership, the National Arboretum and the U.S. Fish and Wildlife Service.

== See also ==
- List of District of Columbia rivers
