= Pinehurst Branch =

Location
- Country: United States
- Federal district: District of Columbia

Physical characteristics
- Mouth
  - location: Rock Creek
  - coordinates: 38°58′16″N 77°2′38″W
  - elevation: 154 ft (47 m)

Pinehurst Branch is a tributary stream of Rock Creek in Washington, D.C., United States. The watershed of the stream is 619 acres (2.51 km^{2}).

As of 2025 the District of Columbia Department of Energy and Environment is planning a stream restoration project on Pinehurst Branch, to improve wildlife habitat and wetlands, and improve water quality.
