= Rock Creek (Potomac River tributary) =

Tributary of the Potomac River in Maryland and Washington, D.C., United States

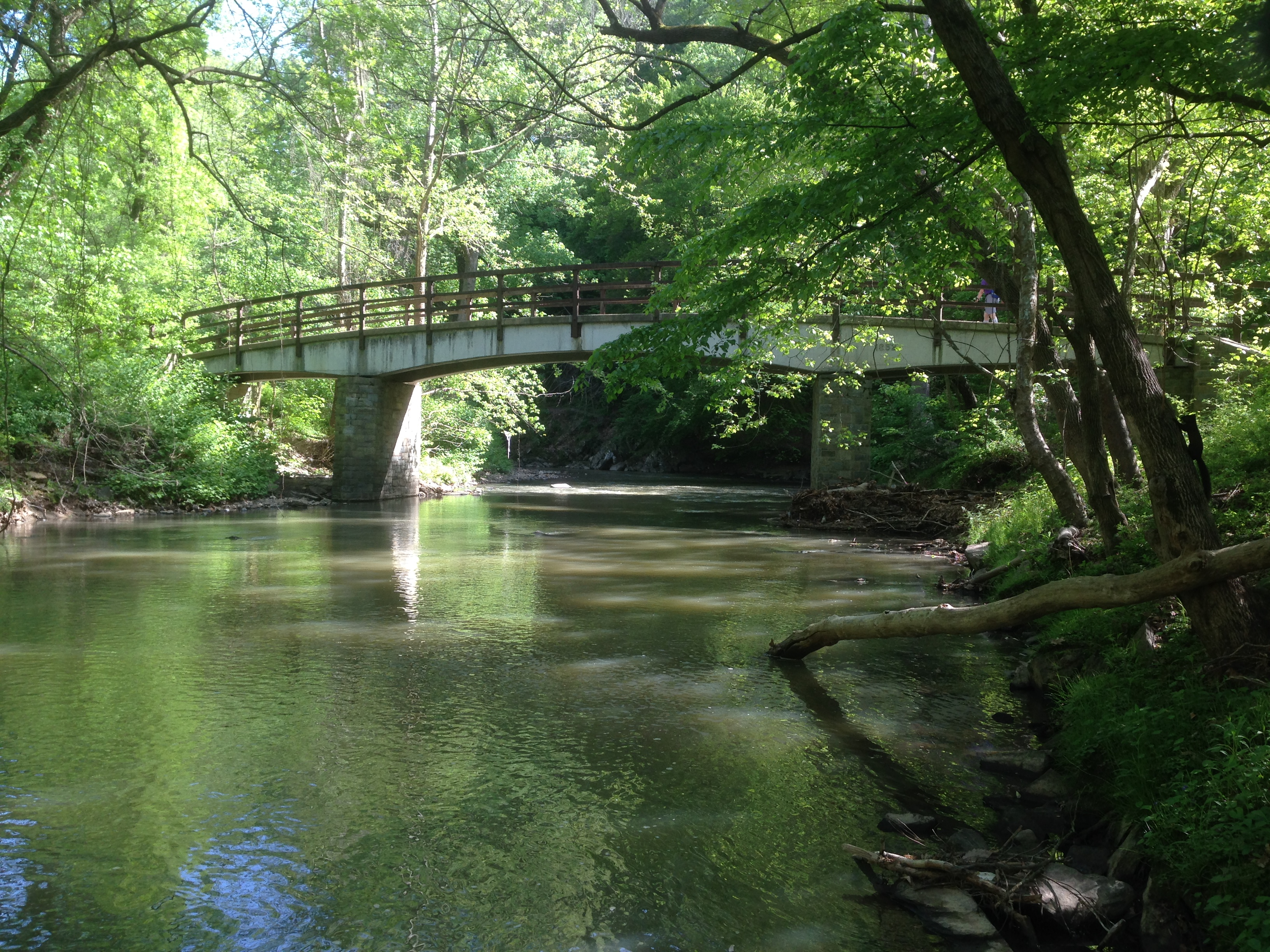
- Rock Creek in Washington, D.C., in 2015

Location
- Country: United States
- States: Maryland, District of Columbia
- Counties: MD: Montgomery; DC: City of Washington

Physical characteristics
- Source
  - location: Laytonsville, Maryland
  - coordinates: 39.1990012°N 77.1388044°W
  - elevation: 560 feet (170 m)
- Mouth
  - location: Potomac River
  - coordinates: 38.899556°N 77.0572°W
  - elevation: 0 feet (0 m)
- Length: 32.6 mi (52.5 km)
- Basin size: 76.5 mi^{2} (198 km^{2})
- Discharge
  - average: 63.7 cu ft/s (1.80 m^{3}/s)

Basin features
- Landmarks: Rock Creek Park
- Waterbodies: Lake Needwood

Rock Creek is a tributary of the Potomac River, in the United States, that empties into the Atlantic Ocean via the Chesapeake Bay. The 32.6-mile (52.5 km) creek drains about 76.5 square miles (198 km^{2}). Its final quarter-mile (400 m) is affected by tides.

== Geography ==
=== Course ===
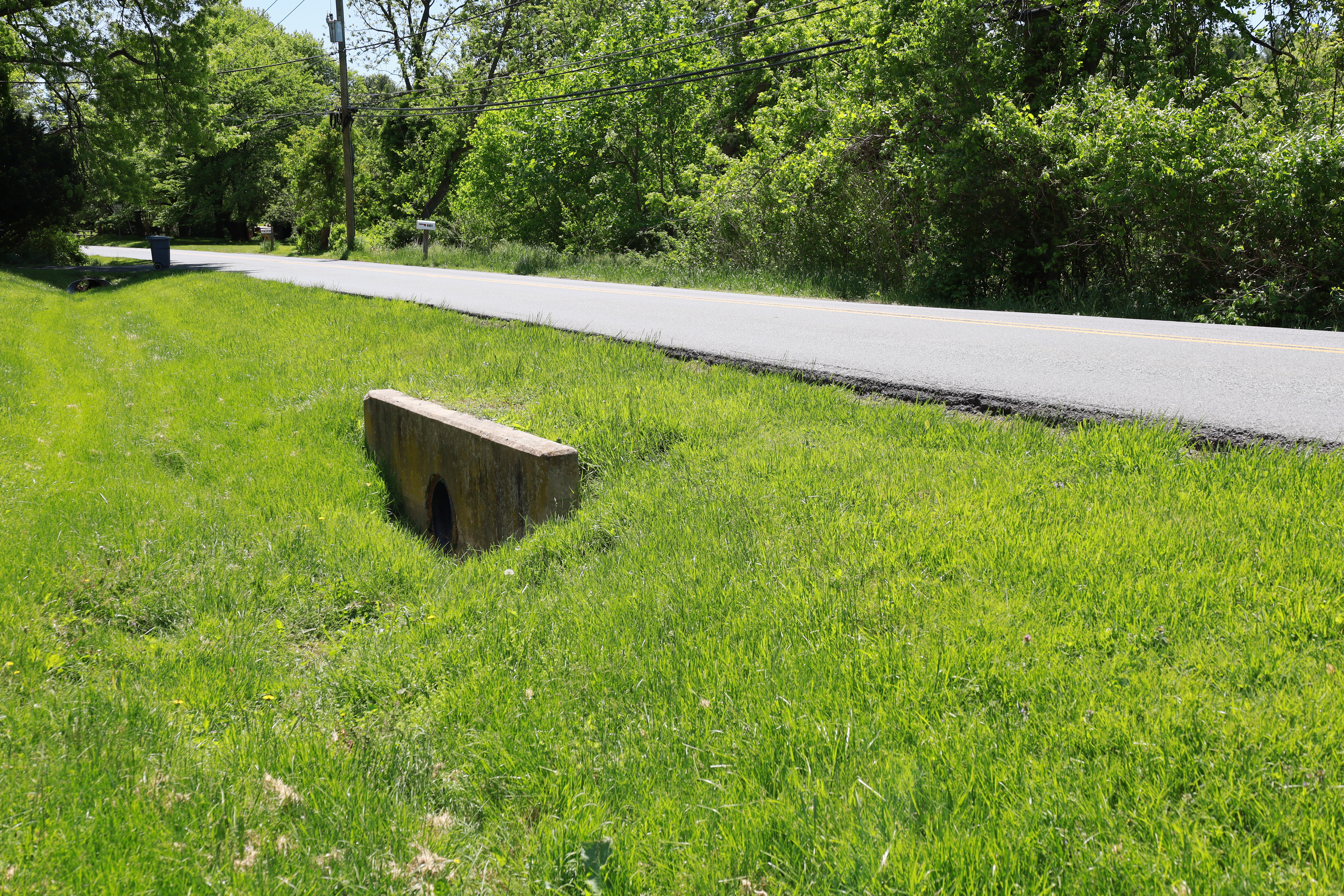
The culvert at the source of Rock Creek

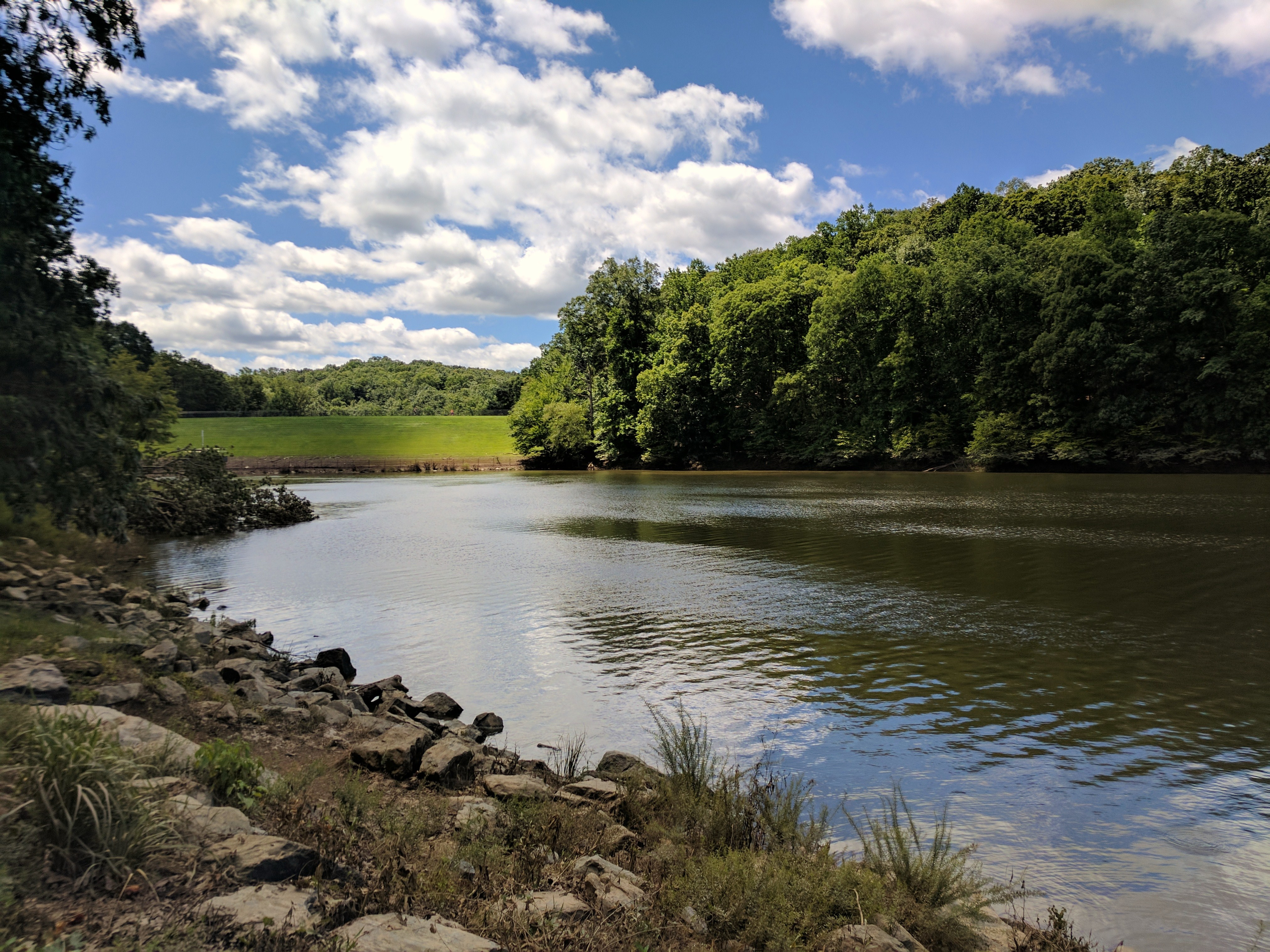
Lake Needwood

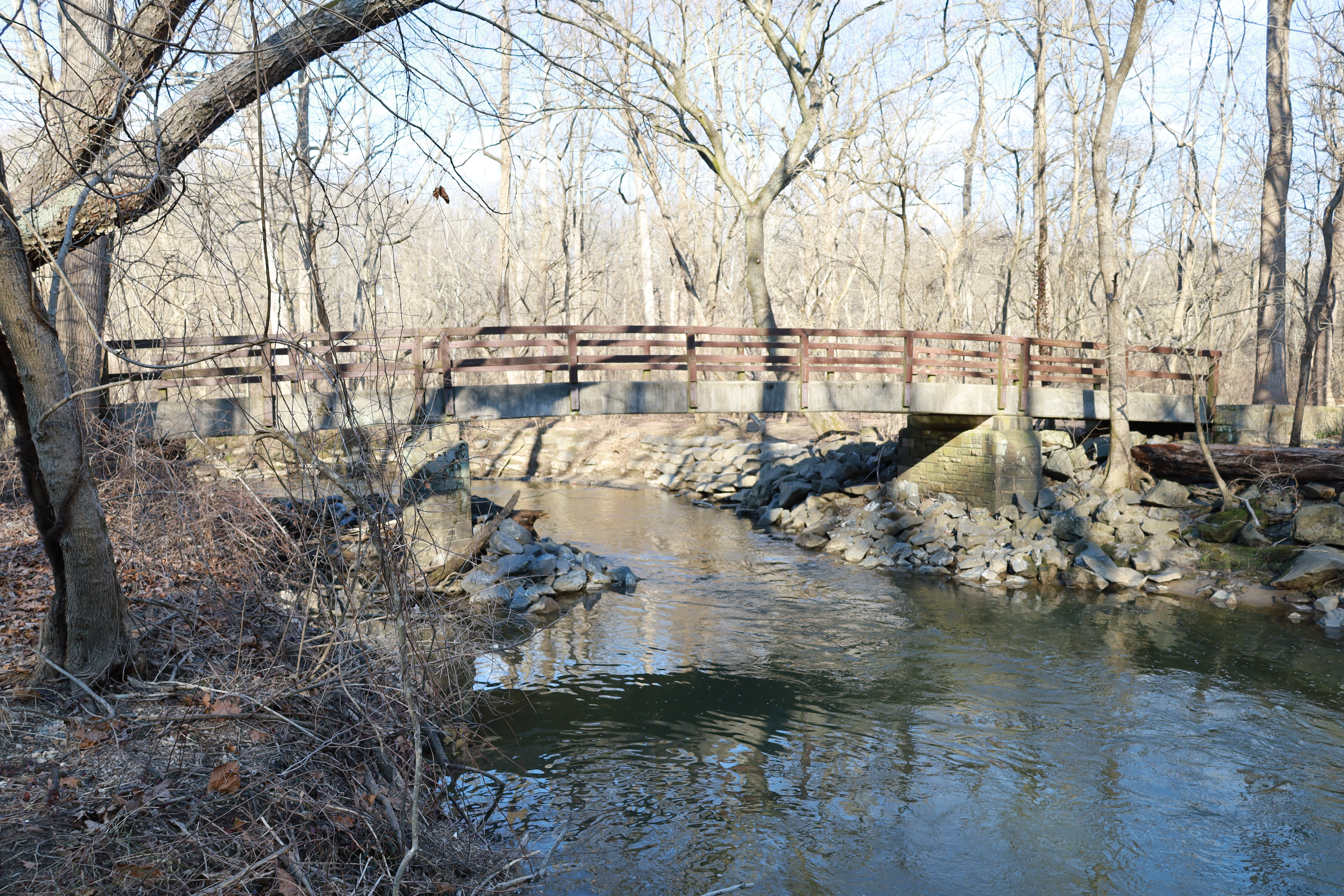
The Boundary Footbridge crosses Rock Creek at the Maryland–D.C. border

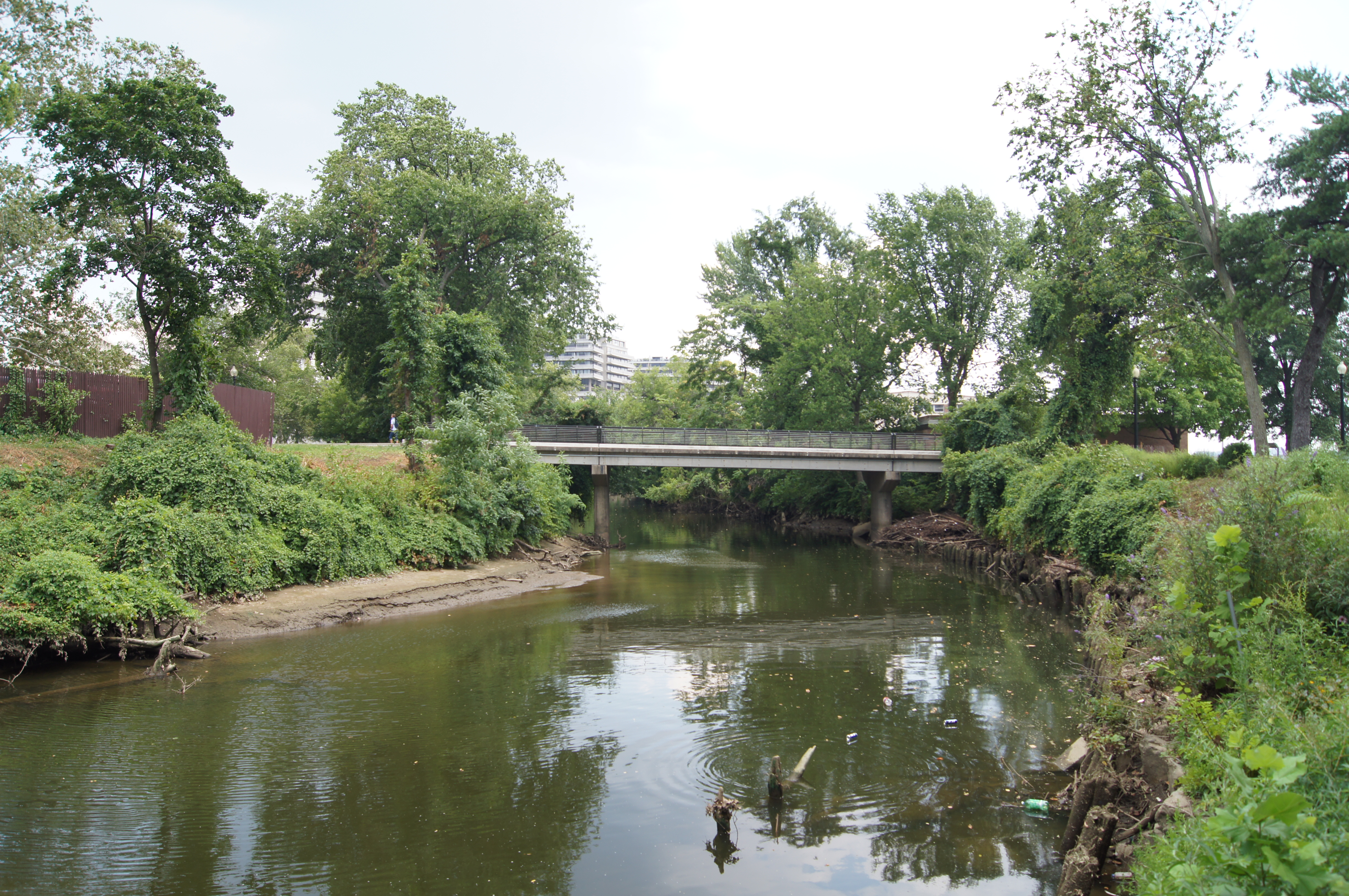
Rock Creek near its terminus at the Potomac River in Georgetown

The creek rises from a culvert under Dorsey Road at the north edge of Laytonsville Golf Course in Montgomery County, Maryland. A dam forms a small lake near its source. After exiting the golf course, Rock Creek flows between residential developments until it meets Agricultural History Farm Park, where the Upper Rock Creek Trail starts. It flows underneath the Intercounty Connector, which crosses it on a large arch bridge visible from the trail.

It then flows into Lake Needwood at Rock Creek Regional Park in Maryland's Derwood–Rockville area. South of the Lake Needwood Dam, Rock Creek flows in a deep gorge and is paralleled by the main Rock Creek Trail, and is joined by the North Branch Rock Creek. It exits the gorge near the Twinbrook neighborhood of Rockville and the Parklawn Memorial Cemetery.

At North Kensington, Beach Drive begins to parallel the creek. The creek eventually crosses the Capital Beltway and later reaches the Washington, D.C., border.

The creek flows for about 9 miles (14 km) through Rock Creek Park in Washington, where it is fed by several small creeks (Piney Branch, Pinehurst Branch, Broad Branch, Soapstone Branch, and Luzon Branch) and numerous storm sewers.

The Chesapeake and Ohio Canal joins Rock Creek in Georgetown; the creek's mouth is the canal's eastern terminus. Just below this confluence, the Canal Company in 1831 completed a mole, causeway, and waste weir. This area, which the company dubbed "Rock Creek Basin", silted up and was dredged several times for the Canal's use. The creek (and the canal) empty into the Potomac River at the Tidewater Lock near the Watergate complex.

=== Watershed ===
The Maryland portion of the watershed comprises the second-largest watershed in Montgomery County, about 60 sq mi (160 km^{2}). About 21 percent of the creek's watershed is in Washington. Total land usage in the watershed is 896 acres (3.63 km^{2}) of wetlands or water, 22,272 acres (90.13 km^{2}) of residential and commercial areas, 15,488 acres (62.68 km^{2}) of forest or grasslands, and 10,304 acres (41.70 km^{2}) of agricultural areas. The creek has a fairly steep gradient, with rapid changes in elevation. The man-made Lake Needwood is located on the creek, north of Rockville.

The conditions of Rock Creek are monitored by the United States Geological Survey.

== Water quality and restoration ==
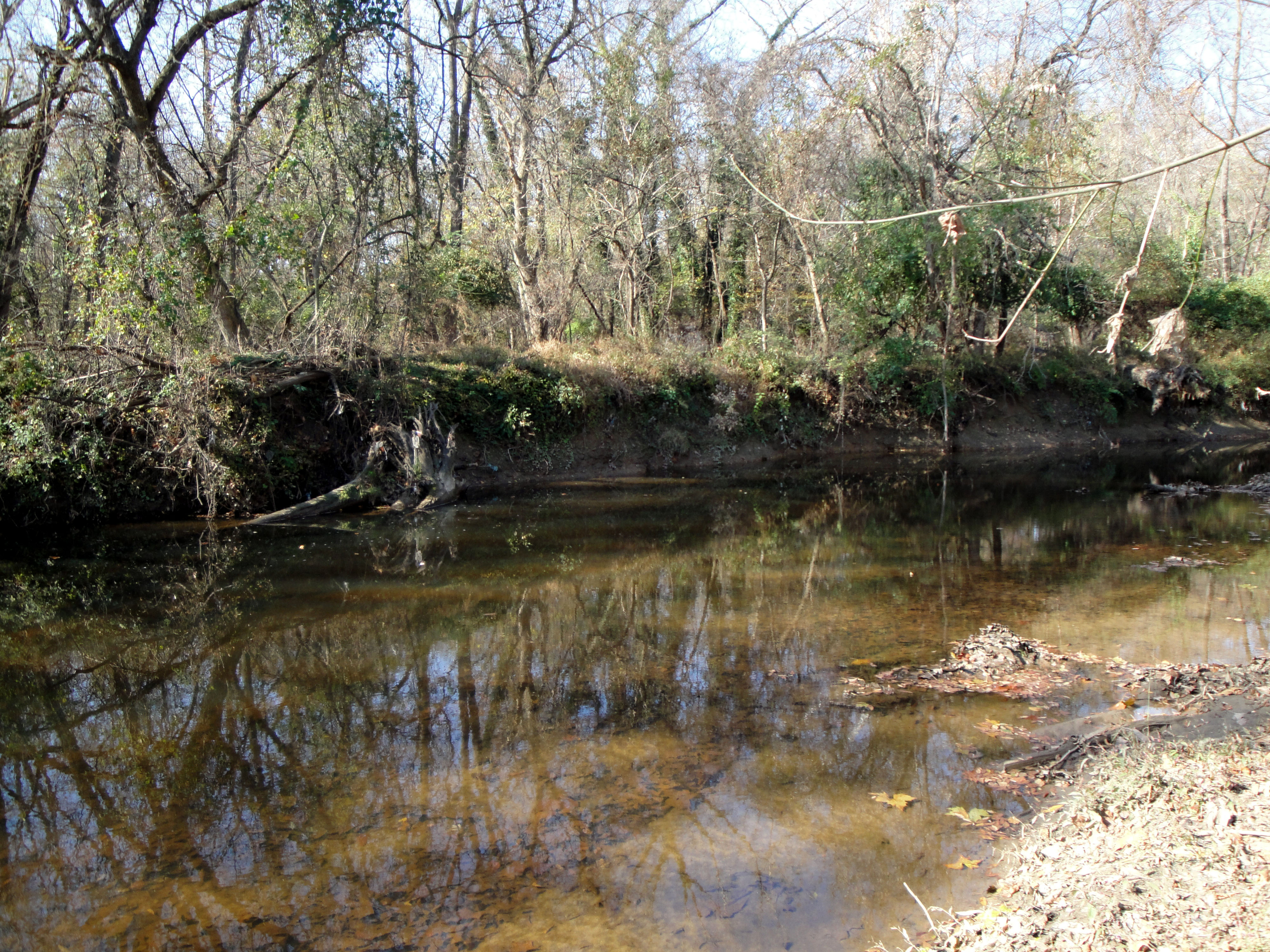
Rock Creek in Chevy Chase, Maryland. The stream bank shows downcutting (vertical erosion) due to stormwater runoff.

In Maryland, most of the northern Rock Creek watershed has good to excellent water quality, according to studies conducted by the Montgomery County government. In 2004, to preserve water quality in partially developed areas, the county imposed restrictions on development (i.e., designation of "Special Protection Areas") in parts of this sub-watershed. The southern portion of the Maryland watershed is highly urbanized. Most of this portion of the creek and its tributaries have poor water quality. Between 1995 and 2023 the county completed 25 stream restoration projects on the Rock Creek main stem or tributaries. As of 2025 the county is planning for 7 additional projects.

The D.C. segment of Rock Creek also has poor water quality. In addition to typical urban stormwater pollution problems such as runoff from streets and other impervious surfaces, the creek has high bacteria levels due to leaking sewer pipes and combined sewer overflows (CSOs). The D.C. government, which has a stormwater discharge permit from the United States Environmental Protection Agency, is improving its stormwater management to raise water quality in Rock Creek. In 2009, the District of Columbia Water and Sewer Authority began a planned two-year effort to replace portions of the combined sewer with separate storm sewers, and so eliminate CSO-related problems in the creek.

As of 2021, the bacteria levels in the creek remained dangerously high due to the leaking sewer pipes, even during dry weather, and the public has been warned not to wade into the creek.

In May 2025, Health and Human Services Secretary Robert F. Kennedy Jr. swam in Rock Creek with his grandchildren.

Fish species observed in Rock Creek and its tributaries include eastern blacknose dace, bluntnose minnow, yellow bullhead, satinfin shiner, swallowtail shiner, longnose dace, and American eel.

=== Restoration projects ===
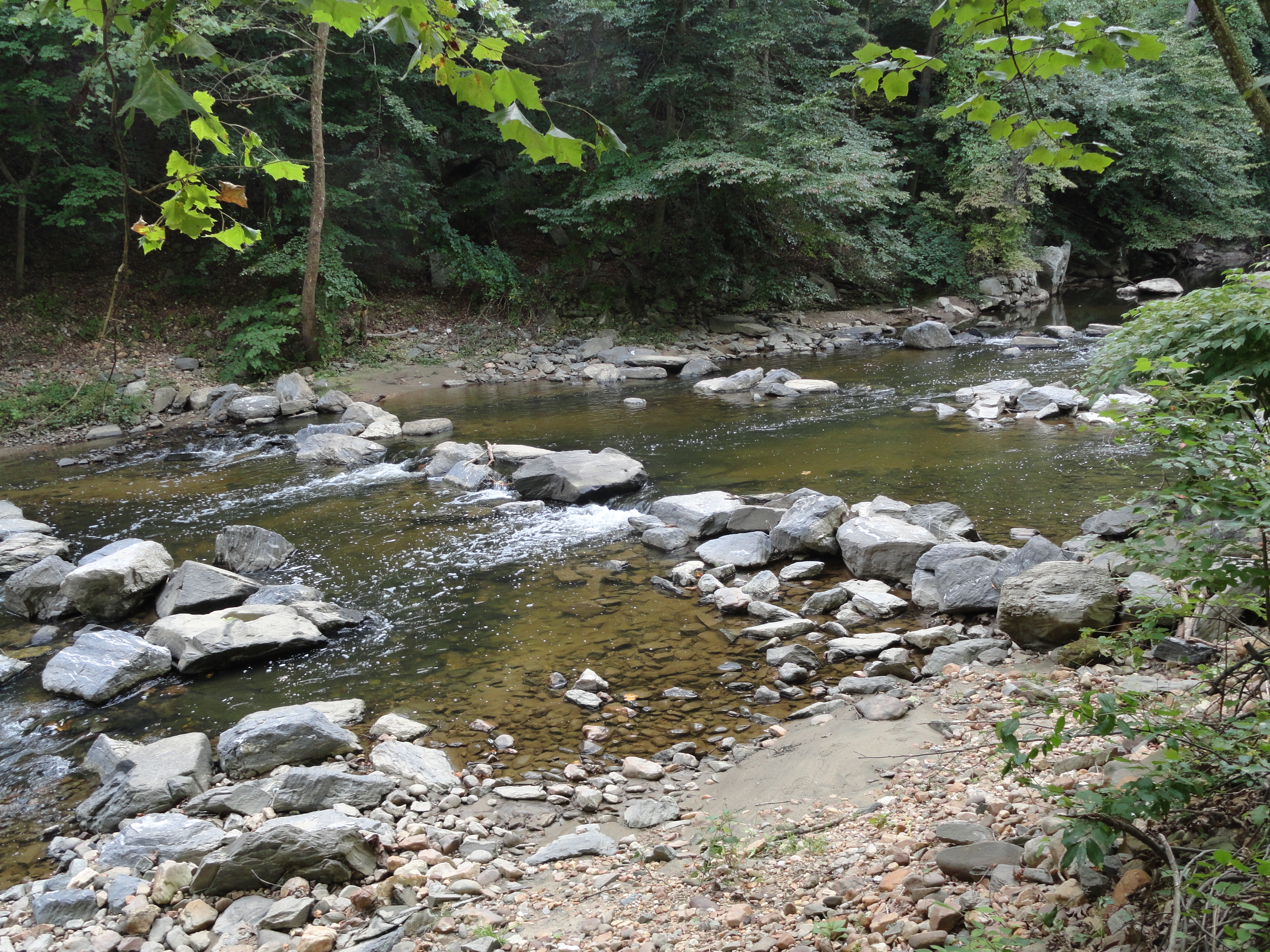
Boulder step pools were installed in a Rock Creek Park stream segment. The pools raise the water level and allow fish to swim over a partially-submerged sewer pipe that crosses the creek.

In 2006, the National Park Service finished a project to remove or bypass eight fish barriers in the creek by adding a fish ladder to bypass the 1905 Peirce Mill Dam, modifying historic fords, and removing abandoned sewage lines and fords. The effort was designed to restore American shad, river herring, and other migratory fish to the creek and their historic upriver spawning grounds. An estimated two million fish migrate up the creek each year.

The D.C. government completed a restoration project on the Milkhouse Run and Bingham Run tributaries in 2013. As of 2014, ongoing restoration projects in the watershed include the Broad Branch and Klingle Run tributaries.

== Tributaries ==
(Listed in order from the mouth upstream)

In D.C.

- Dumbarton Oaks
- Normanstone Creek
- Klingle Valley Creek (also called Klingle Creek, Klingle Run)
- Piney Branch
- Melvin Hazen Valley Branch
- Broad Branch
  - Soapstone Branch
- Luzon Branch
- Milkhouse Run
- Bingham Run
- Pinehurst Branch
- Fenwick Branch
  - Portal Branch

In Maryland

- Donnybrook Tributary
- Coquelin Run
- Capitol View Tributary
- Kensington Heights Branch
- Stoney Creek
- Alta Vista Tributary (formerly Bethesda Run)
- Luxmanor Branch
- Stoneybrook Tributary
- Josephs Branch
- Turkey Branch
- Sycamore Creek
- Croydon Park Tributary
- Southlawn Branch
- Williamsburg Run
- North Branch (Lake Bernard Frank)
- Lake Needwood (in-line on Rock Creek)
- Crabbs Branch
- Mill Creek
- Pope Farm Branch
- Airpark Road Branch

== See also ==
- List of crossings of Rock Creek
- List of rivers of Washington, D.C.
- List of rivers of Maryland
- Rock Creek and Potomac Parkway
- Tidewater Lock
