= Derwood, Maryland =

- Census-designated place
- Location within Maryland Location within the United States
- Coordinates: 39°06′49″N 77°09′03″W
- Country: United States
- State: Maryland
- County: Montgomery

Area
  - Total: 0.63 sq mi (1.62 km^{2})
  - Land: 0.63 sq mi (1.62 km^{2})
  - Water: 0 sq mi (0.00 km^{2})
- Elevation: 453 ft (138 m)

Population (2020)
  - Total: 2,535
  - Density: 4,045.7/sq mi (1,562.07/km^{2})
- Time zone: UTC−5 (Eastern (EST))
  - Summer (DST): UTC−4 (EDT)
- FIPS code: 24-22775
- GNIS feature ID: 2583607

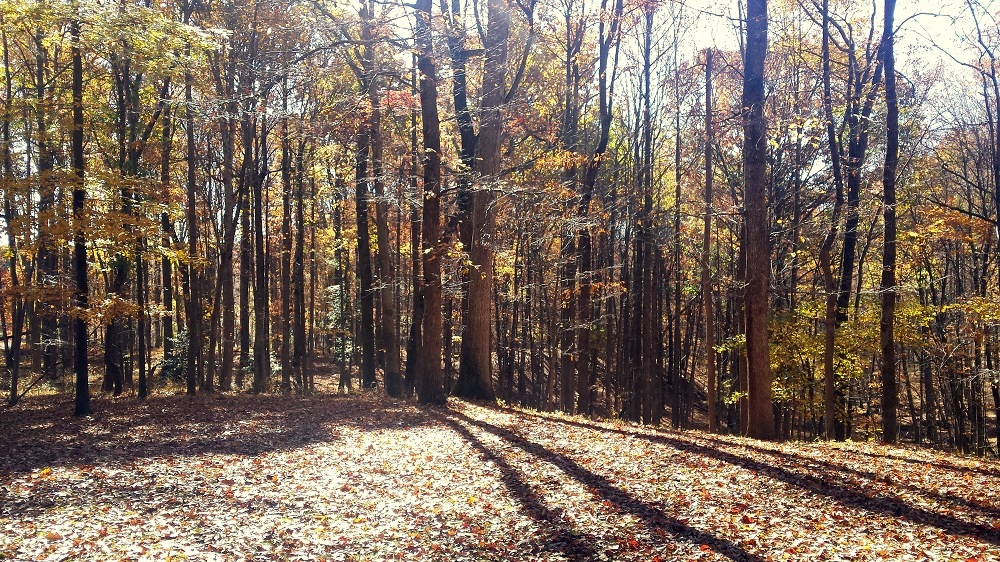
Autumn in Derwood

Derwood is an unincorporated area and census-designated place in east-central Montgomery County, Maryland, United States. It lies just north of Rockville, southeast of Gaithersburg, southwest of Olney, and northwest of the greater Silver Spring area. Derwood was originally "Deer Park" and was then "Deer Wood" before getting its current name.

The unincorporated area of Derwood includes the neighborhoods of Derwood Heights, Derwood Station, Mill Creek Towne, Needwood Estates, Muncaster Manor, Muncaster View, Hollybrooke, Granby Woods, Park Overlook, Preserve at Rock Creek, Redland Crossing, Candlewood Park, Cashell Estates, Avery Forest, Avery Lodge, Avery Village, Bowie Mill Estates, Bowie Mill Park, Winters Run, Redland Station, Rolling Knolls, Emory Grove, and Shady Grove Crossing, but the census-designated place consists of a far smaller area.

Between 2009 and 2011, Maryland Route 200 (also known as the Intercounty Connector or ICC) was constructed directly through central Derwood, affecting Cashell Estates and areas near Shady Grove Road.

== History ==
Derwood was first recognized in the 1880s as a train stop on the B&O Railroad, which is now the intersection of Indianola Drive and Maryland Route 355 in Derwood Station. A second, larger railroad station was built in Derwood from 1886 to 1889. In the early 1900s, a small community grew up around the station.

On January 7, 1954, Schwartz Mill caught fire and both it and the Derwood railroad station were destroyed. Derwood station was never rebuilt, since there were not enough passengers traveling through the area.

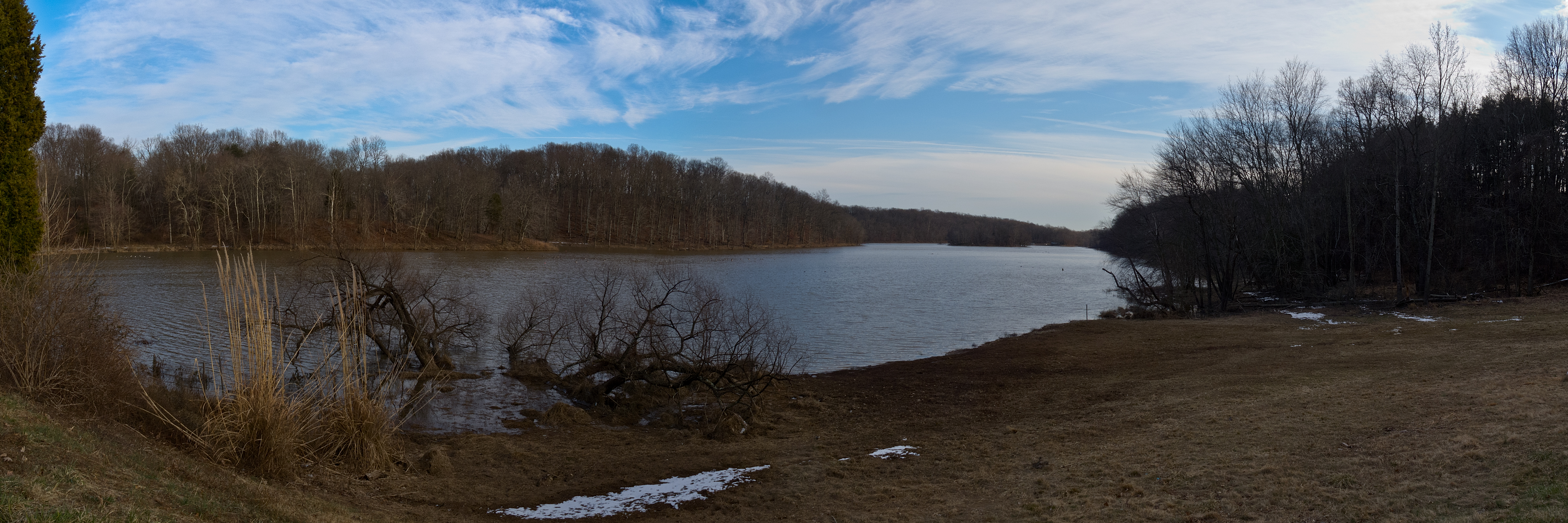
Lake Needwood

In 1965, the man-made Lake Needwood was created by impounding Rock Creek.

In 1974, the Derwood post office relocated to Redland Shopping Center. It kept the name "Derwood Branch," and designated the entire 20855 zip code area as Derwood, greatly increasing its size. The community's population expanded with the establishment of Shady Grove Metro station in 1984.

== Geography ==
According to the United States Census Bureau, Derwood has a total area of 0.628 square miles (1.63 km^{2}), of which, 0.627 square miles (1.62 km^{2}) is land and 0.01 square miles (0.03 km^{2}) is water.

Derwood is located in the north central part of Montgomery County, in the Atlantic coastal plain. The community is near the start of the Appalachian highlands.

Derwood has a humid subtropical climate similar to nearby Washington D.C. It lies in hardiness zone 7a, with chilly winters, where the daily maximum temperatures are mostly above freezing, and the minimum are generally below freezing.

== Demographics ==
Historical population
Census	Pop.	Note	%±
2020	2,535		—
U.S. Decennial Census; 2010

=== 2020 census ===
As of the 2020 census, Derwood had a population of 2,535. The median age was 42.6 years. 21.5% of residents were under the age of 18 and 20.5% of residents were 65 years of age or older. For every 100 females there were 87.6 males, and for every 100 females age 18 and over there were 82.6 males age 18 and over.

100.0% of residents lived in urban areas, while 0.0% lived in rural areas.

There were 966 households in Derwood, of which 33.0% had children under the age of 18 living in them. Of all households, 56.7% were married-couple households, 14.5% were households with a male householder and no spouse or partner present, and 26.5% were households with a female householder and no spouse or partner present. About 23.7% of all households were made up of individuals and 11.5% had someone living alone who was 65 years of age or older.

There were 979 housing units, of which 1.3% were vacant. The homeowner vacancy rate was 0.0% and the rental vacancy rate was 1.9%.

Racial composition as of the 2020 census
Race	Number	Percent
White	1,055	41.6%
Black or African American	310	12.2%
American Indian and Alaska Native	9	0.4%
Asian	676	26.7%
Native Hawaiian and Other Pacific Islander	0	0.0%
Some other race	168	6.6%
Two or more races	317	12.5%
Hispanic or Latino (of any race)	378	14.9%

=== 2010 census ===
Derwood first appeared as a census designated place in the 2010 U.S. census formed from part of Redland CDP and additional area.

=== Demographic estimates ===
Derwood households' median annual household income in 2026 is $57,486. However, 3.4% of households in Derwood are in poverty. Derwood residents are 39.9 years old on average.

== Economy ==
Goodwill Industries is based in Derwood.

== Public schools ==
Residents are zoned to Montgomery County Public Schools.

Students who are residents of Derwood are either in the Magruder or Richard Montgomery cluster and attend the following schools, some of which are outside of Derwood:

- Elementary schools
  - Washington Grove Elementary School
  - Mill Creek Towne Elementary School
  - Sequoyah Elementary School
  - Candlewood Elementary School
  - College Gardens Elementary School
  - Judith A Resnik Elementary School
- Middle schools
  - Redland Middle School
  - Shady Grove Middle School
  - Julius West Middle School
- High schools
  - Colonel Zadok A. Magruder High School
  - Richard Montgomery High School
