= 2026 Potomac River sewage spill =

Sewage spill in the United States

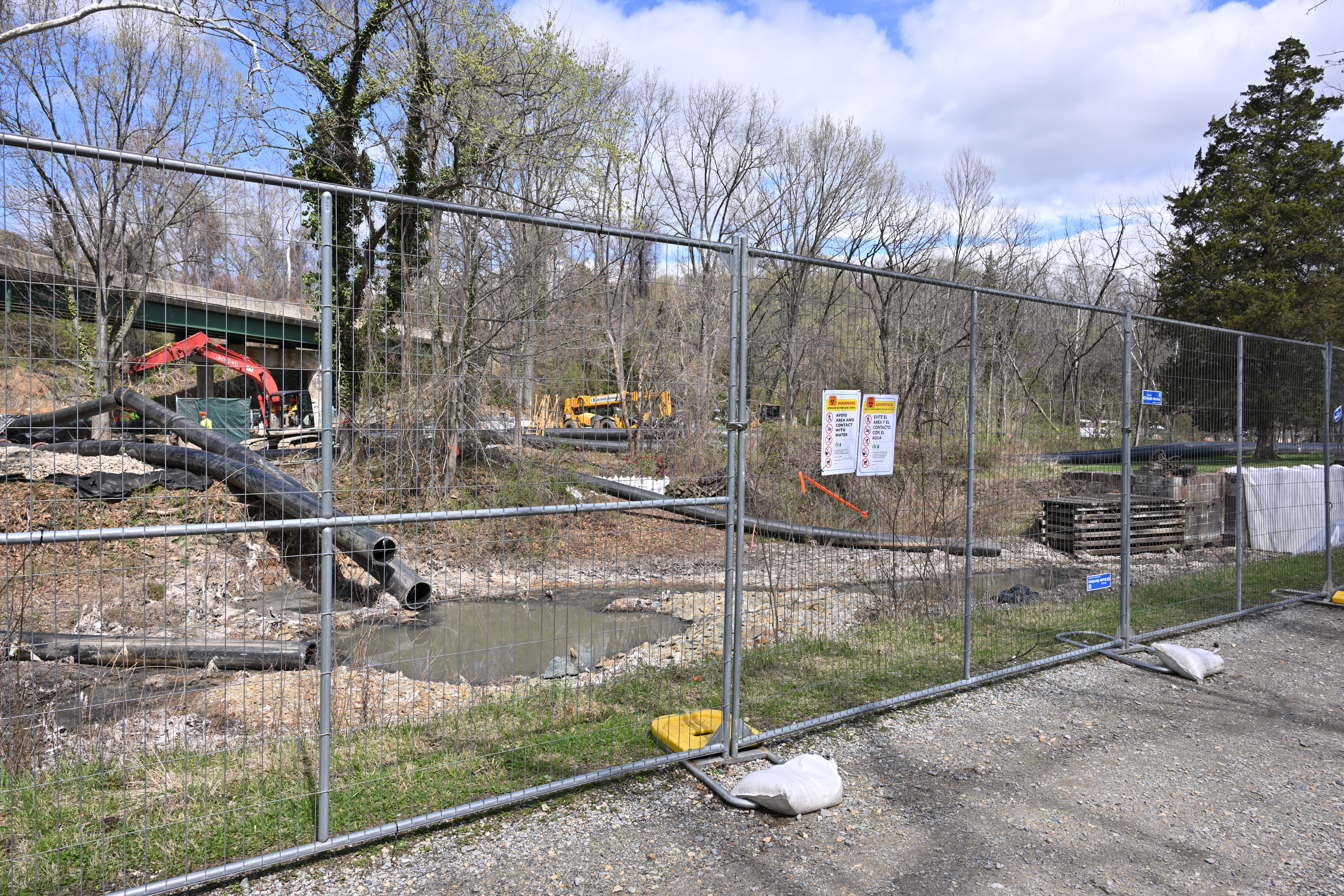
- Temporary sewer pipes at C&O Canal Lock 12
- Location of the spill along the Potomac River
- Date: January 19, 2026
- Location: Potomac River, near Potomac, Maryland; 38.972412°N 77.168784°W
- Type: Sewage spill

On January 19, 2026, a section of the 72-inch-diameter Potomac Interceptor (PI) sewer line collapsed near the Clara Barton Parkway in Montgomery County, Maryland, approximately 5 miles (8.0 km) upstream of Washington, D.C. An estimated 240 million to 300 million gallons (910 million to 1.1 billion liters) of untreated wastewater was spilled into the Potomac River. According to the University of Maryland School of Public Health, the sewage spill is one of the largest in U.S. history.

== Background ==
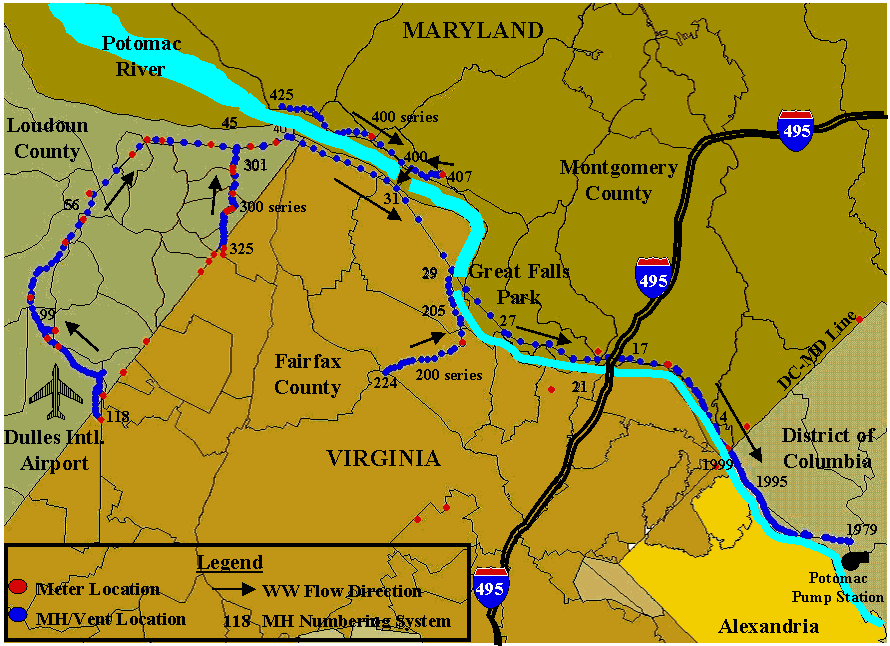
Potomac Interceptor map

The Potomac Interceptor sewer, principally constructed in 1962, originates in the Virginia and Maryland suburbs, and transports wastewater from Dulles International Airport, surrounding communities in Virginia, and parts of Montgomery County to the Blue Plains Advanced Wastewater Treatment Plant in Washington, which is owned by District of Columbia Water and Sewer Authority (DC Water). This large piping system is constructed of reinforced concrete pipe, and one section of the system is located within the Chesapeake and Ohio Canal National Historical Park. DC Water is responsible for managing most of the PI sewer infrastructure. The Washington Suburban Sanitary Commission (WSSC) manages a section of the PI in the Maryland suburbs.

== Emergency response and repair efforts ==
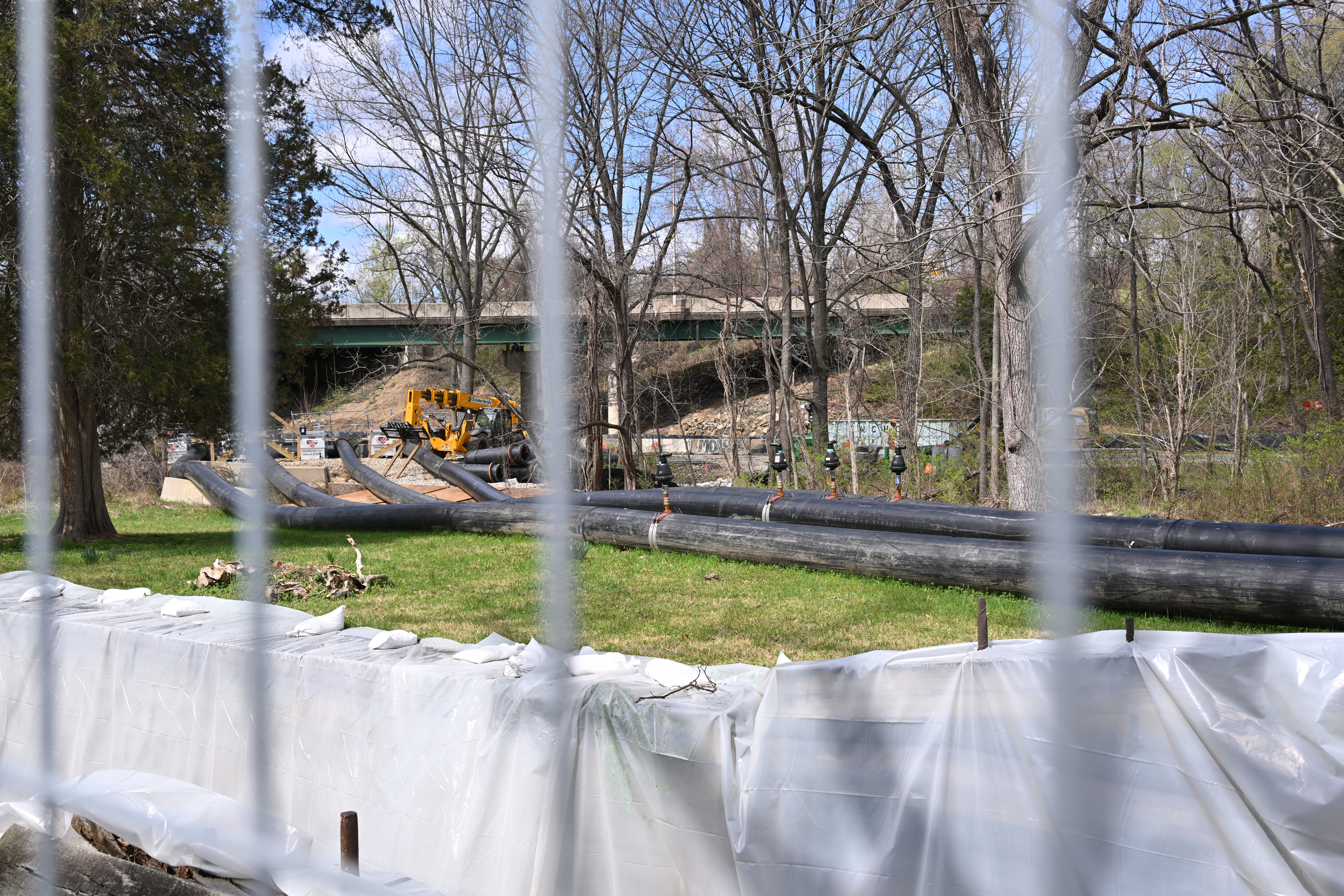
Sewer pipes near canal lock 12

After a section of the 72-inch-diameter Potomac Interceptor (PI) sewer line collapsed near the Clara Barton Parkway on January 19, 2026, DC Water installed a bypass system in cooperation with the National Park Service (NPS) that diverted sewage upstream of the collapse into a quarter-mile dry stretch of the C&O canal and carried the wastewater 2,700 feet (820 m) before the water entered a non-damaged part of the Potomac Interceptor downstream. The canal was dammed at lock 14 to prevent snowmelt from entering the bypass section, and wastewater was returned to the PI near lock 10.

DC Water activated the bypass on the evening of January 24 and started capturing the majority of the wastewater. Later, the bypass was enhanced with additional pumps bringing water into the canal to add capacity and redundancy.

Video inspection of the PI showed significant blockage inside the collapsed sewer line, including a large rock dam about 30 feet beyond the initial collapse location. Crews were able to reach the damaged pipe section by February 19, once a steel bulkhead gate was installed to block sewage from entering it.

On February 16, 2026, President Donald Trump announced that the federal government would respond to the spill, while blaming Democratic leaders of local authorities, particularly Maryland Governor Wes Moore. A spokesman for Moore stated, "The President has his facts wrong — again", explaining that the Trump administration is "actually supposed to be in charge here". The Maryland Department of the Environment (MDE) does not regulate DC Water but monitors water quality in the river. DC Water managed the PI repairs and issued daily updates. The District of Columbia Department of Energy and Environment (DOEE) also began issuing weekly updates about the PI, pertaining to water quality monitoring and related information.

DC Water estimated the repair and remediation costs to be $20 million. On February 18, DC Mayor Muriel Bowser declared a public emergency. Bowser requested federal assistance and reimbursement, and a presidential disaster declaration. On February 19, Trump announced that the federal government was responding to Bowser's request, with the U.S. Environmental Protection Agency (EPA) leading the response, along with the Federal Emergency Management Agency. The US Army Corps of Engineers began providing assistance at the spill site on February 21. On February 28, the National Park Service issued a special-use permit for the repair and environmental restoration of the Potomac Interceptor and the C&O Canal National Historical Park at the area of the PI collapse between Locks 10 and 14.

New clay lining on the canal in November, 2026

On March 14, the emergency repair efforts were completed, and full flow returned to the interceptor. All bypass pumps were turned off. DC Water began new long-term work to rehabilitate and strengthen the pipe, which was expected to take nine to ten months.

After the spill was contained, DC Water started working on environmental restoration. In the spring and summer crews sampled and scraped the canal bed, removing nearly 8,500 tones of contaminated topsoil. In October, crews started lining the canal trench with 2,500 tons of clay to form a new protective seal.

== Environmental impact ==
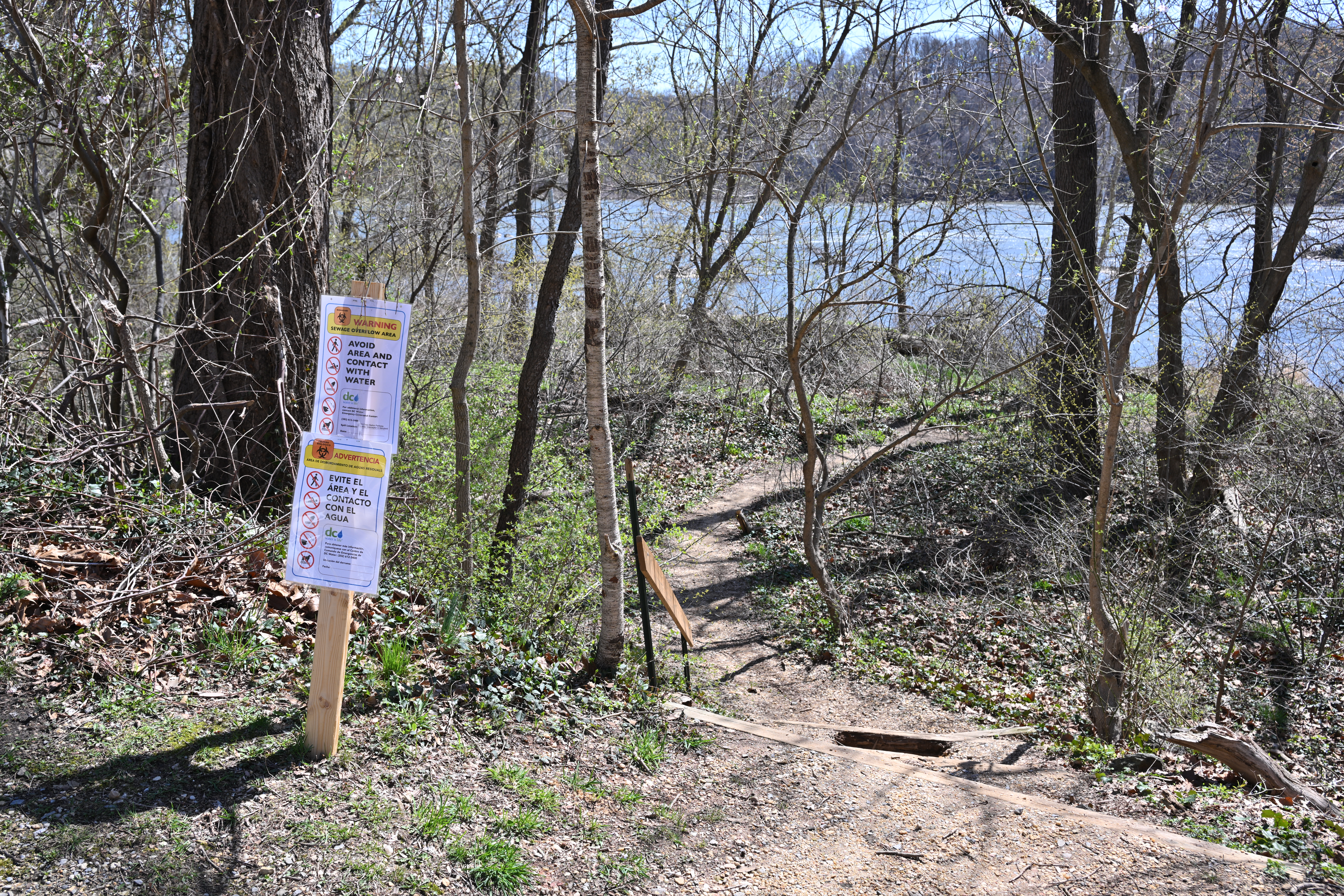
"Avoid Area and Contact with Water" warning sign near the Potomac River

On January 29, 2026, DC Water began daily bacteria monitoring at six locations, with four additional locations added later. The wastewater had a significant impact on the bacteria levels in the Potomac. E. coli bacteria levels were hundreds of times higher than the EPA's safety levels when the water was tested. Because the river was frozen over, downstream water in Georgetown was within safety limits published by the U.S. Environmental Protection Agency (EPA).

The Maryland Department of the Environment (MDE) stated, "All active Maryland drinking water intakes are upstream and unaffected." On January 25, the agency closed one downstream shellfish harvesting area in Charles County as a precautionary measure. MDE conducted several inspections at the spill site jointly with EPA. Three Maryland counties (Montgomery, Prince George's and Charles County) issued health advisories recommending avoiding recreational activity in the river.

On February 17, the government of Arlington County, Virginia, released an announcement that the county's drinking water was safe for human consumption. The announcement repeated the advice of the Virginia Department of Health, which had issued a recreational activity advisory encouraging people to avoid being in the Potomac due to concerns regarding the spread of illness.

The drinking water systems in Maryland and Washington were also not affected by the spill. The principal drinking water intake for Washington and Arlington is located upstream of the spill at Great Falls. While a smaller, supplemental intake for the Washington Aqueduct system is located at Little Falls, downstream of the spill, it had been shut off before the January spill. The Potomac River water intake for the Montgomery County system, operated by WSSC, is also located upstream of the spill.

DC DOEE stated that they plan to conduct surveys in spring 2027 to examine the long-term impacts of the sewage spill on fish and wildlife.

In October 2026 D.C. Water officials declared that the river had returned to normal based on testing water samples five times at six different spots upstream and downstream of the spill.

== Litigation ==
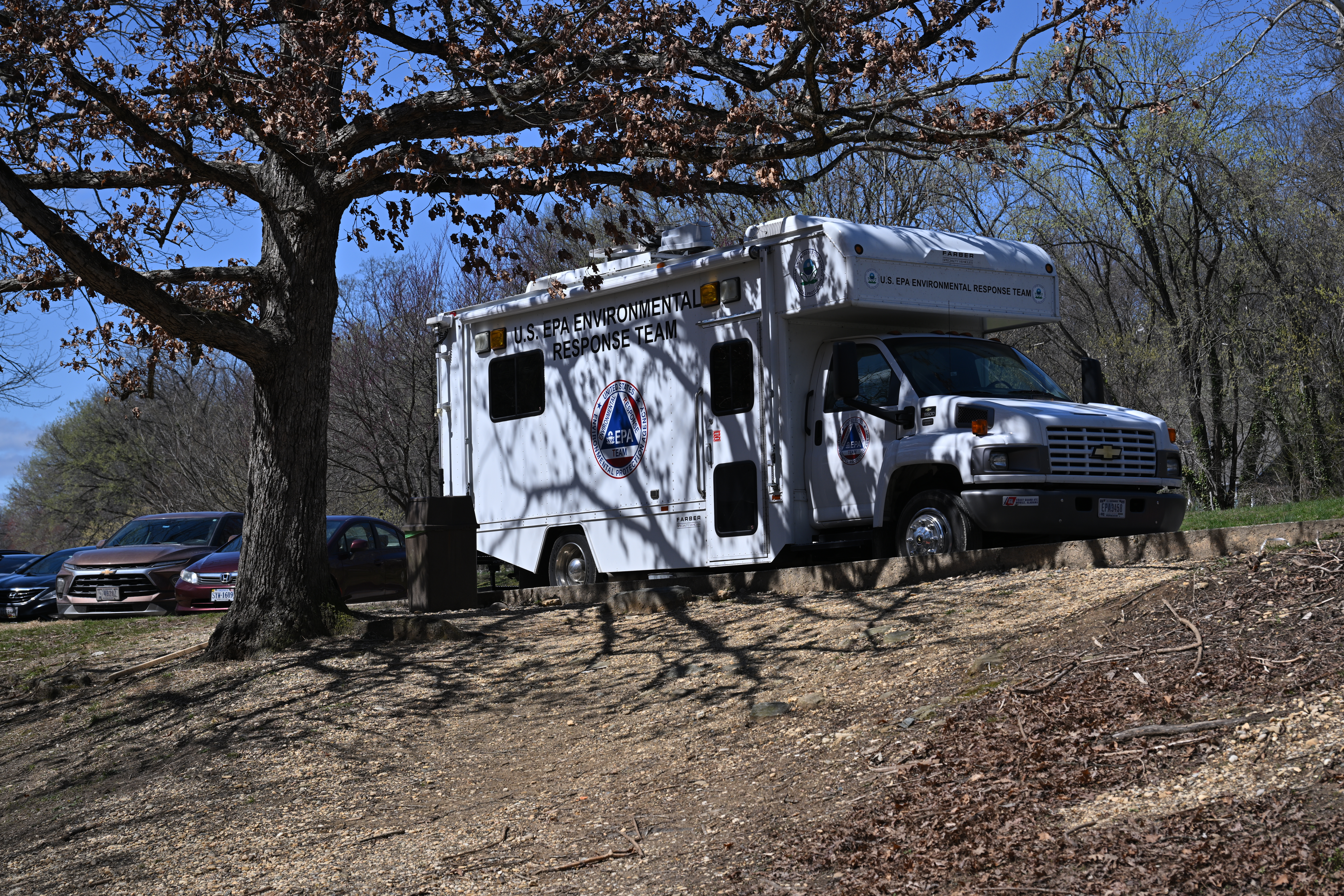
United States Environmental Protection Agency (EPA) truck at the site of the sewage spill

On March 6, 2026, a group of land and vessel owners filed a class action lawsuit against DC Water for damages from the sewage spill, including property contamination and business interruptions. The lawsuit included claims of negligence, private nuisance, and trespass.

On April 20, 2026, lawsuits against DC Water were filed by the United States Department of Justice on behalf of the United States Environmental Protection Agency, and jointly by the Maryland Attorney General and the Maryland Department of the Environment. The DOJ's civil complaint claimed that DC Water had violated the Clean Water Act and, among other things, asked that DC Water develop an enhanced operations and maintenance plan for each of its sewer lines. The Maryland complaint requested civil penalties of up to $10,000 per day for each violation of state water pollution laws and ordered DC Water to pay for all environmental testing and cleanup costs and to cover damages for any lost value of the state's natural resources.
