= George S. Hawkins (lawyer) =

American lawyer

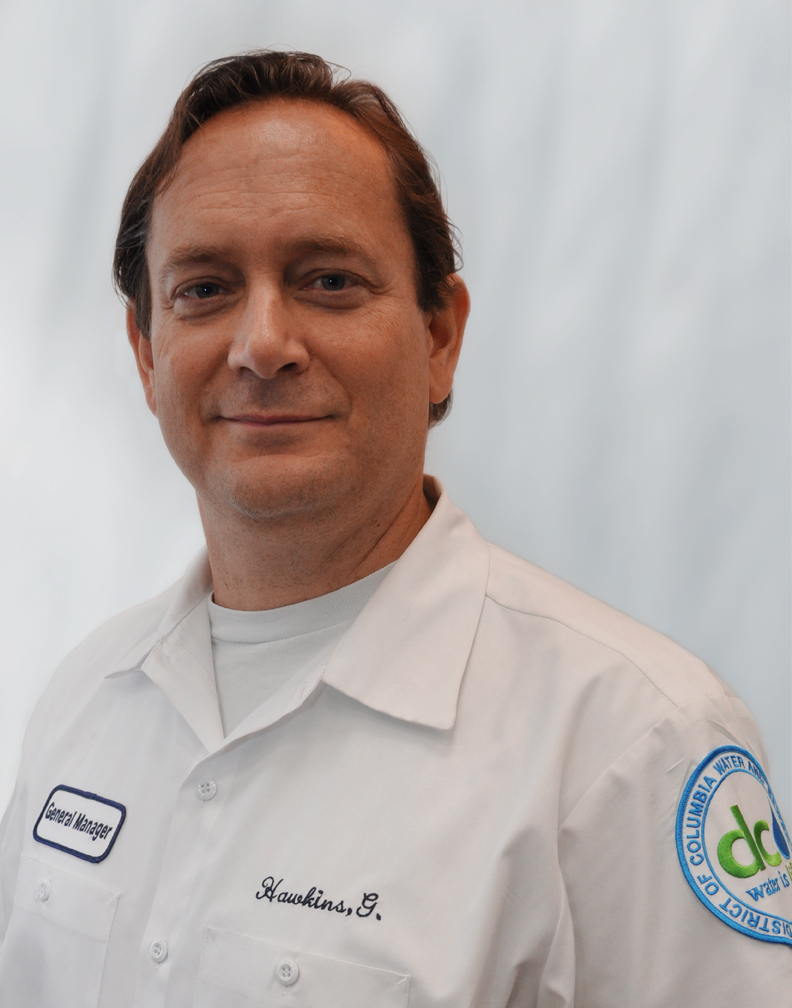
George S. Hawkins

George S. Hawkins is an American lawyer, college professor and environmentalist. He served as general manager of the DC Water and Sewer Authority (DC Water) from 2009 to 2017. Hawkins has worked in the environmental industry, as a corporate lawyer and as a regulator.

He was named to his post at DC Water in a unanimous vote September 3, 2009 by the board of directors. With an operating and capital budget of nearly $800 million, DC Water provides drinking water delivery and wastewater collection and treatment for a population of more than 600,000 in the District of Columbia, as well as the millions of people who work in or visit the District. DC Water also treats wastewater for a population of 1.6 million in Montgomery and Prince George's counties in Maryland, and Fairfax and Loudoun counties in Virginia. The Authority operates the world's largest advanced wastewater treatment plant at Blue Plains.

== Education ==
George Sherman Hawkins was born to Edward Jackson Hawkins and Barbara Rollo Hawkins in Cleveland, Ohio. He graduated summa cum laude from Princeton University in 1983 and cum laude from Harvard Law School in 1987. Since 1999, Hawkins has taught Environmental Law and Policy for the Princeton Environment Institute at Princeton University.

== Career ==
Hawkins began his career practicing law for the Boston firm Ropes & Gray, and is a member of the Bar in both Massachusetts and the District of Columbia.

Early in his career, Hawkins served as Executive Director of the Stony Brook-Millstone Watershed Association and held senior posts with the United States Environmental Protection Agency (U.S. EPA) including Senior Assistant Regional Counsel and Special Assistant to the Regional Administrator. He served Vice President Al Gore on the National Performance Review, and worked in environmental protection programs at the United States Environmental Protection Agency and the US Occupational Safety and Health Administration (OSHA).

Hawkins was Executive Director of New Jersey Future, a non-profit organization which, under his leadership, advocated earnestly for smart growth. While there, Hawkins worked with Governor Jon Corzine's office to develop transit stations in urban areas.

He then moved to the District of Columbia to head the District Department of the Environment. Hawkins led a project by the District to reduce childhood exposure to lead hazards. He negotiated and oversaw the implementation of the nation's most stringent federal permit to reduce pollutants from stormwater runoff. He managed the nation's a low-income energy assistance program, including energy conservation and home weatherization. Hawkins launched and chaired the Mayor's Green Team, which coordinates the District Government's internal sustainability program across more than 40 agencies. He also launched the Mayor's Green Summer Job Corps, a program serving several hundred District youth providing summer jobs in environmental cleanups and public education.

Hawkins served as the Chair of the Green Building Advisory Council, which oversees the implementation of the District's green building law. He was also a member of the Mayor's Green Collar Jobs Advisory Committee. Since September 2009, Hawkins has been the general manager for the District of Columbia Water and Sewer Authority (DC Water). At DC Water, Hawkins launched an agenda to improve aging infrastructure and comply with newer, more stringent regulatory requirements. DC Water is designing and implementing a $2.6 billion program, the Clean Rivers Project, to nearly eliminate overflows of sewage and stormwater to the Anacostia, Potomac and Rock Creek DC Water is also investing $950 million to achieve the next level of nutrient reductions to help restore the Chesapeake Bay.

In addition, DC Water is implementing a $400 million digester program to help manage solids being removed from reclaimed water that will become the region's biggest source of renewable energy, reduce the volume of biosolids by almost half. The digester project will be the first in North America to use the thermal hydrolysis in the treatment process, and the largest installation in the world to use CAMBI's thermal hydrolysis process. Finally, general manager Hawkins has gained approval from the board of directors to triple the rate of DC Water's program to replace water and sewer infrastructure, much of which was installed generations ago.

At DC Water, he launched the "Team Blue" improvement program, connected to the "BlueStat" process to evaluate business processes with benchmarks and performance statistics. Hawkins is also working with local and national environmental advocates to achieve the water quality improvements.

On the subject of Hawkins' selection, DC Water Board chairman William M. Walker said, "We needed someone who can think strategically, who understands the significant environmental issues that [DC Water] faces." "Who better than a general manager who has a law degree from Harvard, who has worked for the EPA, and has run the [city environment department]?"

== Honors and awards ==
- 2016 – Public Official of the Year, Water Environment Association
- 2015 – George W. Fuller Award for Leadership and Innovation, American Water Works Association
- 2014 – Public Official of the Year Award, Governing Magazine
- 2014 – Business Leader, DC Chamber of Commerce
- 2014 – Public Leader Award, DC Building Industry Association
- 2010 – Best New Hire, Washington City Paper
- March 2005 – Jack Gleeson Award for Conservation Service, Friends of Hopewell Valley Open Space
- April 2004 –New Jersey Planning Officials "Achievement in Planning" Award
- April 2002 – "Ruth Patrick" Award for Excellence in Environmental Education, Water Resources Association
- December 2000 – Statewide Watershed Excellence Award, New Jersey Department of Environmental Protection
- February 1997 – U.S. EPA Silver Medal Award for work on RESULTS performance tracking system
- December 1996 – Vice President Al Gore's Hammer Award for work on StarTrack
- December 1996 – U.S. EPA Bronze Medal Award for assistance to the metal finishing industrial sector
- December 1996 – U.S. EPA Office of Environmental Stewardship "Team of the Year" for StarTrack
- September 1996 – Featured in "The Best Kept Secrets in Government" by Vice President Gore and the National Performance Review
- June 1996 – U.S. EPA Community-Based Environmental Protection Champion Award
- November 1995 – U.S. EPA Region Employee of the Month for work on the HADCO XL Proposal
- October 1995 – U.S. EPA Environmental Educator Award for outreach and educational efforts
- August 1995 – Regional Administrator's Achievement Award for managing Reinvention Initiatives
- October 1993 – U.S. EPA Special Act Award for Superfund Case Development for the Shaffer Landfill

== Publications ==
- Hawkins, George, "The Race for Open Space," Policy Research Institute for the Region, Princeton University, 2006.
- Hawkins, George, "Speaking Out, Publicity and Driving Change," River Voices, River Network, Volume 14 – Number 3, Dec 2004
- Hawkins, George, "A Municipal Stormwater Rule Primer," New Jersey State League of Municipalities, April 2004.
- Hawkins, George, "The Theory and Practice of Environmental Change," Essay cited by graduate student at the Yale School of Forestry as the best recent essay on environmental change, Fall, 2003.
- Hawkins, George, (and Robert K. Tucker, Peter R. Jaffe, Kerry Kirk Pflugh, and Branden B. Johnson), "Integrating Models of Citizens' Perceptions, Metal Contaminants, and Wetlands Restoration in an Urbanizing Watershed," Society for Wetland Scientists, 2001 EPA STAR/NSF/USDA Water and Watersheds Progress Review Proceedings, San Francisco CA, April 19–21, 2001, US EPA Office of Research and Development EPA/600/R-01/014.
- Hawkins, George and Carnegie, John, "The Changing Currents of Water Quality Protection," New Jersey Planners Journal, Volume 5, No. 1, Summer 1999.
- Hawkins, George, "From Smokestack to Watershed: Safeguarding Water Quality," NJ Municipalities, June 1999.
- Hawkins, George, "The Changing Face of Compliance and Enforcement" (Natural Resources and the Environment, ABA Section on Natural Resources, Energy and Environmental Law, Spring, 1997).
- Hawkins, George, "The Eagle Agenda – An Agenda for the Future of Environmental Protection" Unpublished manuscript, cited by authors Lawrence Susskind and Joshua Secunda.
- Frequent lecturer at law schools, universities, community groups, municipal boards and other organizations on issues in watershed management, community action, land use and environmental law. Featured on regional and statewide media, including NJN, Comcast, DC local news, NY Times, Washington Post, The Times of Trenton and The Star Ledger.
