= R. Bradford Malt =

American lawyer

- Born: August 1, 1954 (age 72); Boston, Massachusetts, U.S.
- Other name: Brad
- Education: Harvard College; Harvard Law School
- Occupations: Corporate Lawyer, Chairman of Ropes & Gray
- Employer(s): Ropes & Gray
- Parent(s): Ronald A. Malt, Geraldine Malt

Ronald Bradford ("Brad") Malt (born August 1, 1954) is a prominent corporate lawyer and the former chairman of Ropes & Gray LLP, whose practice focused on private equity transactions.

== Early life and education ==
Ronald Bradford Malt was born in 1954 in Boston, Massachusetts. He is the son of Geraldine and Ronald A. Malt. Malt graduated from Harvard College (1976) with a degree in applied mathematics and from Harvard Law School (1979).

== Career ==
Malt joined Ropes & Gray LLP in 1979. He became a member of the firm's management committee in 1993 and has served as Chair of the firm from 2004 through 2019 .

Malt is a corporate lawyer who was founder of the private equity practice at Ropes & Gray. He has been called "one of the top lawyers in the country for handling leveraged buyouts and private equity deals."

In 2003, when Mitt Romney was elected Governor of Massachusetts, Malt became trustee of the blind trusts holding Governor Romney's assets. He continued to serve as sole trustee of the trusts during Governor Romney's presidential campaigns in 2008 and 2012.
