= Frederick Charles Lough =

US Army brigadier general

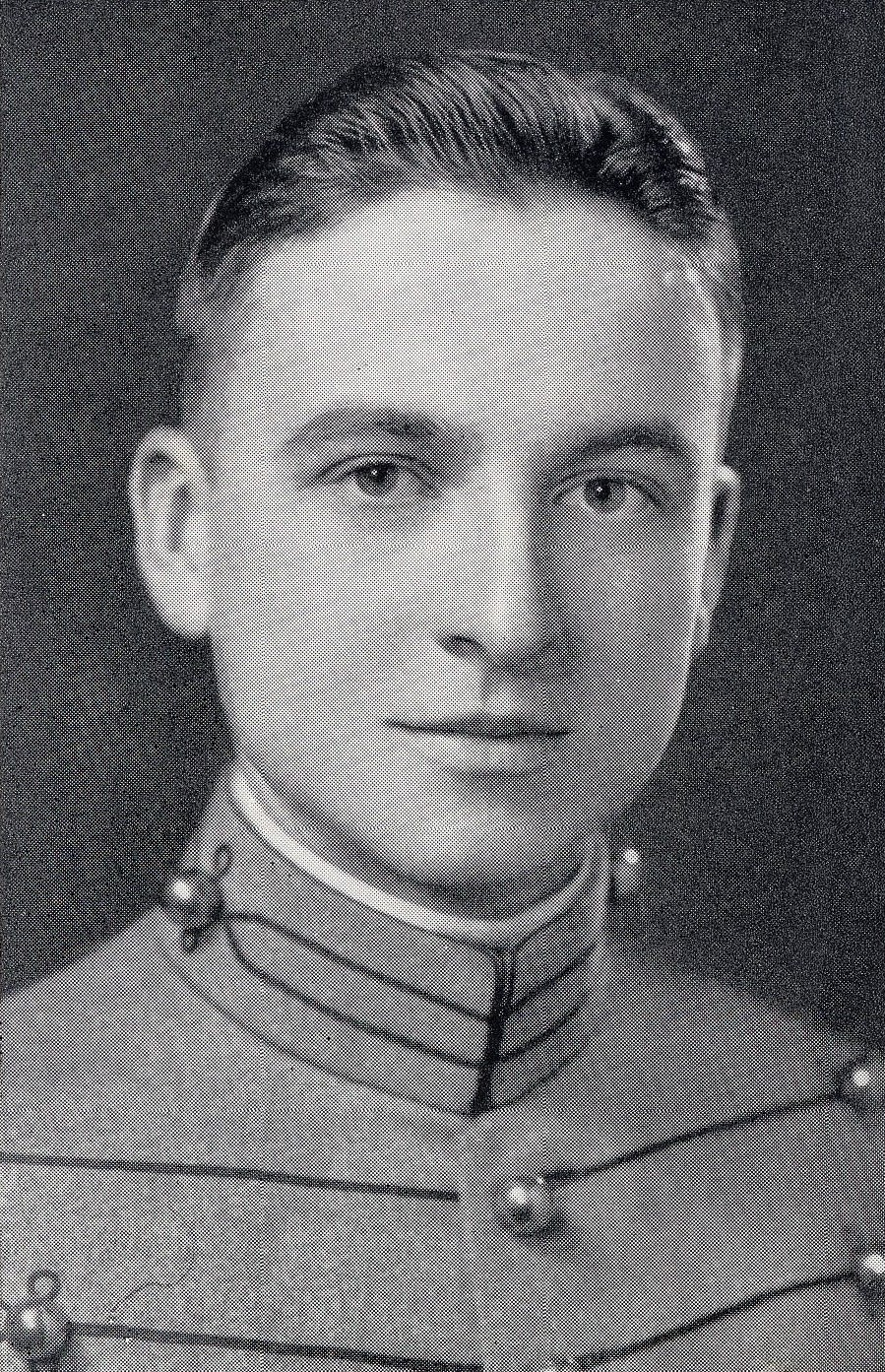
- Lough as a Cadet in 1938
- Born: March 6, 1916; Fall River, Massachusetts
- Died: May 30, 2002 (aged 86); Hyannis, Massachusetts
- Burial place: U.S. Military Academy Post Cemetery in West Point, NY.
- Spouse: Marguerite Lough
- Military career
- Allegiance: United States of America
- Branch: United States Army
- Service years: 1938–1977
- Rank: Brigadier General
- Conflicts: World War II: Italian Campaign; Operation Avalanche; Battle of Anzio
- Awards: Legion of Merit (2); Distinguished Service Medal
- Other work: Associate Professor of Law

Frederick Charles Lough (1916–2002) was a U.S. Army Brigadier General. He was a Lieutenant Colonel (Signal Corps) during World War II and received a Legion of Merit award for exceptionally meritorious conduct. He was also a recipient of the Distinguished Service Medal.

== Education ==
- Durfee High School in Massachusetts
- Graduated from the U.S. Military Academy at West Point with a B.S. degree in 1938.
- In 1949, Lough earned an LL.B. degree from Columbia University.
- In 1959, he graduated from the Industrial College of the Armed Forces.

== Career ==
On June 14, 1938, Lough was commissioned as a second lieutenant in the Signal Corps. In 1941, he was sent to London where he later joined General Dwight D. Eisenhower's staff planning for the Africa campaign.

In 1943, Lough assumed command of the 63rd Signal Battalion in Italy. He was awarded the Legion of Merit with one oak leaf cluster for his World War II service. After earning his law degree, Lough transferred to the Judge Advocate General's Corps on March 29, 1951.

=== Teaching ===
- Associate Professor of Law at West Point (1960)
- Head of the Law Department West Point (1963)

After retiring from the Army as a brigadier general in 1977, he joined the law firm of Ropes and Gray in Boston.

== Awards and decorations ==
- Legion of Merit
- Distinguished Service Medal

== Personal ==
Frederick Lough, born in Massachusetts. He attended Durfee High School in Massachusetts. Lough was married to Marguerite and together they had two children: Frederick and Elizabeth. They lived in Osterville, Massachusetts in his later years. After his death at Cape Cod Hospital in Hyannis, he was buried at the West Point Cemetery.
