= Theodore Ruger =

American lawyer

Academic background
- Education: Williams College (BA); Harvard University (JD)

Academic work
- Discipline: Law
- Sub-discipline: Constitutional law Health law
- Institutions: Washington University in St. Louis; University of Pennsylvania

Theodore W. Ruger is an American legal scholar specializing in constitutional law, judicial authority, health law, and the regulation of therapeutic goods. He is the Bernard G. Segal Professor of Law and immediate past dean of the University of Pennsylvania Law School.

== Education ==
Ruger earned a Bachelor of Arts degree from Williams College and a Juris Doctor from Harvard Law School.

== Career ==
Ruger served as a law clerk for Stephen Breyer and Michael Boudin. Ruger worked in private practice at Ropes & Gray and Williams & Connolly. For three years, he was an associate professor at the Washington University School of Law. Ruger joined the faculty at the University of Pennsylvania Law School in 2004. He was promoted to deputy dean of the law school in 2013 and dean in 2015, succeeding interim dean Wendell Pritchett.
