= John Chipman Gray =

American lawyer and legal scholar (1839–1915)

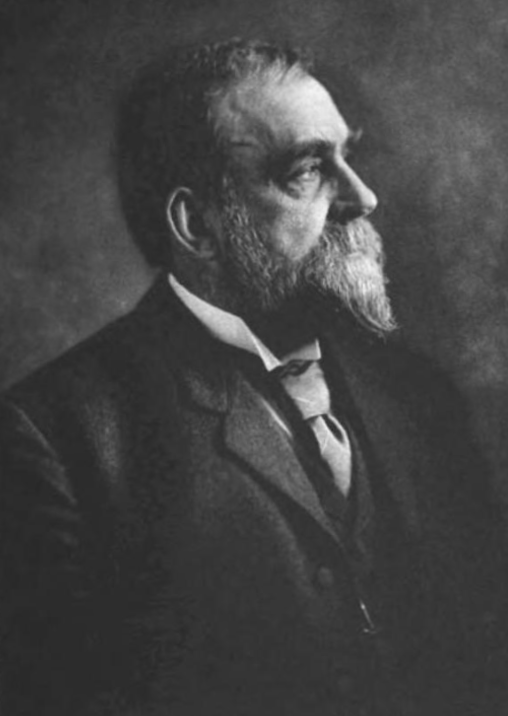
- Born: July 14, 1839; Brighton, Massachusetts, U.S.
- Died: February 25, 1915 (aged 75); Boston, Massachusetts, U.S.
- Education: Harvard University (BA, LLB)

John Chipman Gray (July 14, 1839 – February 25, 1915) was an American scholar of property law and professor at Harvard Law School. He also founded the law firm Ropes & Gray, with law partner John Codman Ropes. He was half-brother to U.S. Supreme Court associate justice Horace Gray, and a grandson of merchant and politician William Gray.

== Early life ==
Gray was born in Brighton, Massachusetts to Horace and Sarah Russell (Gardner) Gray, and graduated from Boston Latin School. From there, he went on to Harvard University, where he earned his Bachelor of Arts degree in 1859, and Harvard Law School, where he earned his law degree in 1861. Gray's politics, prior to the Civil War tended toward the Whig Party. However, he transited into the Know-Nothing Party when the Whigs collapsed. Although he became a Republican, he opined, while serving as a judge advocate, that President Abraham Lincoln did not possess the constitutional authority to issue the Emancipation Proclamation. However, when the Civil War began, he argued that the defeat of slavery was imperative for the survival of the nation.

He was admitted to the bar in 1862, and thereafter served in the Union Army in the American Civil War. He enlisted from Boston as a 2nd lieutenant in Company B, 4th Battalion, Massachusetts Infantry on May 27, 1862, was mustered out a few days later, and commissioned into Company H, 3rd Massachusetts Cavalry on October 7, 1862. He left that unit to accept a commission as a major in the U.S. Volunteers Adjutant General Department on July 25, 1864. Gray was wounded at the Third Battle of Winchester on September 19, 1864, and resigned from the Army on July 14, 1865.

Gray had narrow views on the service of African-American soldiers in the Army. Although he thought highly of his classmate, Robert Gould Shaw, when Shaw's Fifty-Fourth Massachusetts Regiment was decimated at the Battle of Fort Wagner, Gray wrote his mother "with long and careful discipline I suppose a regiment of negroes might do as well as a white regiment, but negroes disciplined no better than many of our white units would be worthless."

== Legal career ==
In 1865, after the end of the Civil War, Gray established his law practice in Boston, Massachusetts, which would eventually evolve into the modern firm of Ropes and Gray. In 1869, he began teaching at Harvard Law School, first as a lecturer, and became a full professor in 1875. In 1883, he was named Royall Professor of Law (a chair named for Isaac Royall, Jr.), a position he would hold for 20 years. He received honorary Doctor of Laws degrees from Yale University in 1894, and from Harvard in 1895.

Two years after retiring from teaching, he died at Boston on February 25, 1915.

== Works written by Gray ==
Gray wrote two books on future interests, Restraints on the Alienation of Property (1883), and The Rule against Perpetuities (1886). His best known work is his survey of the common law, The Nature and Sources of the Law (1909). Gray's writings were so influential that they are still used in American law schools and cited in law journals to this day.

== See also ==
- Restraint on alienation
- Rule against perpetuities
