= District of Columbia Department of Energy and Environment =

DC government agency

- DC DOEE logo

Agency overview
- Formed: February 15, 2006; 20 years ago
- Preceding agencies: Environmental Health Administration; Energy Office
- Jurisdiction: District of Columbia
- Headquarters: 1200 First Street NE, Washington, DC
- Employees: 553
- Annual budget: $337,860,430 (FY 2025)
- Agency executives: Richard Jackson, Director; Michael Somersall, Senior Deputy Director
- Website: doee.dc.gov

The District of Columbia Department of Energy and Environment (DOEE), formerly the District Department of the Environment, serves as an agency within the Executive Branch of the District of Columbia (DC) government to consolidate the administration and oversight of environmental and energy programs, services, laws, and regulations. Under the authority of [DC Law 16-51], DOEE was formed in 2006 through a merger of the DC Government's Environmental Health Administration, the DC Energy Office, policy functions of the Tree Management Administration and policy functions of the Office of Recycling. In 2015, the department was renamed to its current title.

== Background ==
DOEE is a "one-stop shop" for programs and services that protect human health and the environment and address energy efficiency issues for all sectors of the city. DOEE programs are designed to facilitate cleaner air and water, add greenery to neighborhoods and building space, and assist with the management of hazardous and toxic waste disposal. Additionally, DOEE conducts community and educational outreach to increase public awareness of environmental and energy related issues.

== Program areas ==
=== Utilities ===
DOEE operates the District's utility payment assistance programs, intended for help poorer residents pay bills which often contain extra markups to help pay for programs which lessen the impact on the environment from utility operations. Flagship programs include the District's implementation of the federal Low Income Home Energy Assistance Program, the Low Income Household Water Assistance Program, the Clean Rivers Impervious Area Charge Residential Relief Program, and the Utility Discount Programs.

The department also operates programs to clean up both utility distribution networks and utilities within residences under the Energy Efficiency & Conservation Branch and the Lead Hazard Reduction Branch.

=== Green Energy ===
The 'Energy' portion of the department covers initiatives to implement and grow the production of renewable energy as well as efficiency and regulatory programs.

Regulatory programs include the District's Building Energy Performance Standards and District Appliance Efficiency Standards as well as ensuring compliance with bills such as the Healthy Homes and Residential Electrification Amendment Act of 2023

Agency initiatives to promote the growth of renewable energy include administration of the Clean Energy DC Plan, the Energy Assurance Plan, the Transportation Electrification Roadmap, the Solar for All Program, Sustainable DC and Carbon Free DC,

== Administration ==
=== Organization ===
The agency is organized as follows, headquartered at 1200 First street NE:

- Director
  - Senior Deputy Director
    - Operations Services Administration
    - Natural Resources Administration
    - Utility Affordability Administration
    - Environmental Services Administration
    - Urban Sustainability Administration
    - Energy Administration

=== Directors ===
Current director Richard Jackson was appointed by mayor Muriel Bowser in 2022. Former directors include:

| Commissioner | Term | Appointed by | References |
|---|---|---|---|
| George Hawkins | 2007-2009 | Adrian Fenty | |
| Christophe Tulou | 2010-2012 | Adrian Fenty | |
| Keith Anderson | 2012-2014 | Vincent C. Gray | |
| Tommy Wells | 2014-2022 | Muriel Bowser | |
| Richard Jackson | 2022-Present | Muriel Bowser | |
