= Burnt Mills, Maryland =

Place in Maryland, United States

- Census-designated place
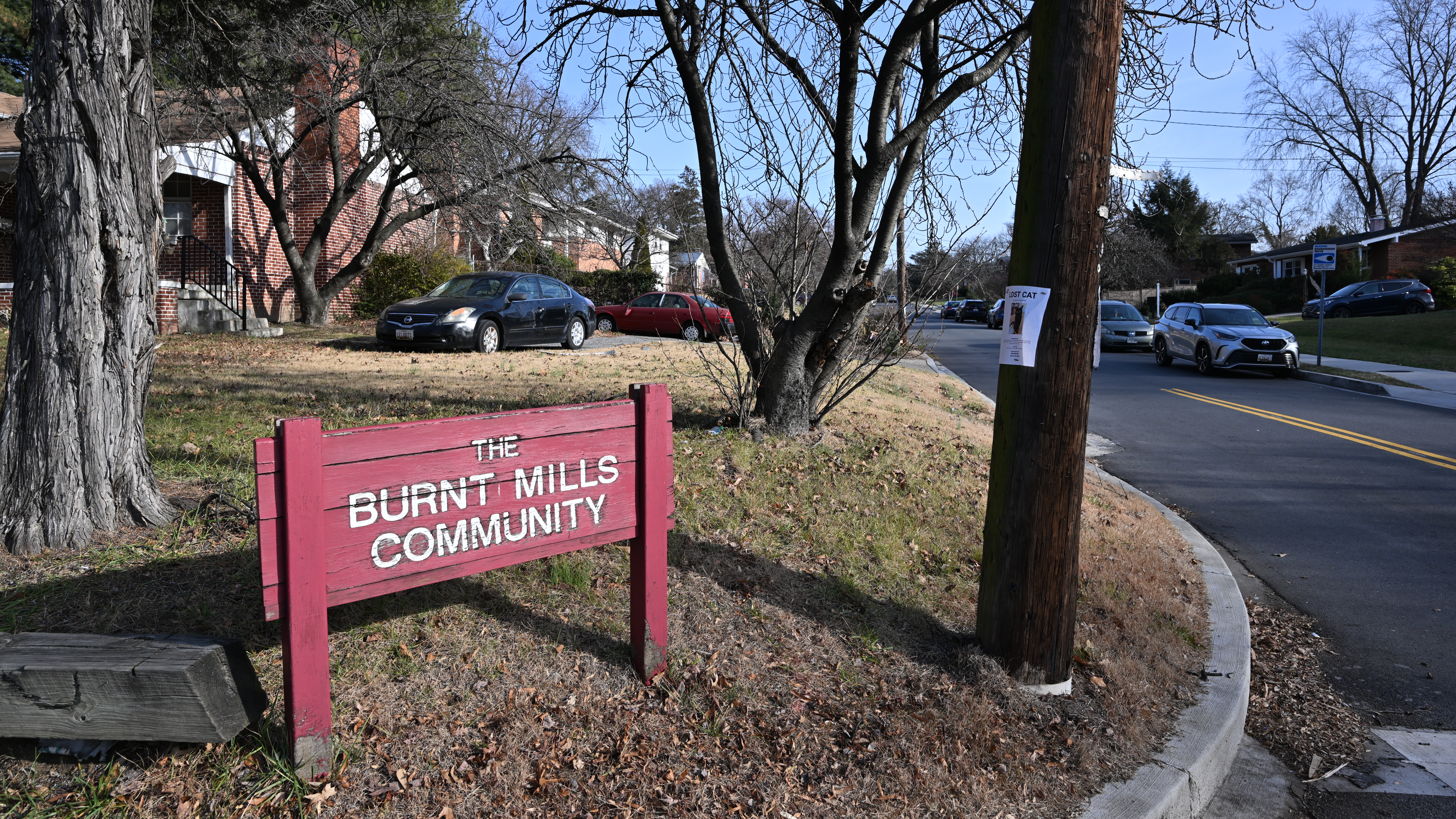

- Location within the state of Maryland Burnt Mills, Maryland (the United States)
- Coordinates: 39°02′04″N 77°00′05″W
- Country: United States of America
- State: Maryland
- County: Montgomery

Area
  - Total: 0.83 sq mi (2.16 km^{2})
  - Land: 0.83 sq mi (2.16 km^{2})
  - Water: 0 sq mi (0.00 km^{2})
- Elevation: 328 ft (100 m)

Population (2020)
  - Total: 3,592
  - Density: 4,303.9/sq mi (1,661.73/km^{2})
- Time zone: UTC-5 (Eastern (EST))
  - Summer (DST): UTC-4 (EDT)
- FIPS code: 24-11550
- GNIS feature ID: 2807038

Burnt Mills is a census designated place in Montgomery County, Maryland, United States. Per the 2020 Census, the population was 3,592.

== History ==
The site of a grist mill that burned down before 1788, Burnt Mills became an important source of clean drinking water for Montgomery and Prince George's Counties in 1929 when the Washington Suburban Sanitary Commission (WSSC) built a water filtration plant here along the Northwest Branch Anacostia River near Silver Spring, Maryland.

At the time of its construction in 1929, the water filtration plant at Burnt Mills was considered a landmark achievement by Robert B. Morse, chief engineer, and the WSSC, reflecting public awareness "of the importance of managed water systems to public health." The plant's office and pumping station were housed inside two Georgian Revival style houses at 10700 and 10701 Colesville Road (also known as Columbia Pike). A steel and concrete hollow deck Ambersen style dam was built across the river.

The Robert B. Morse Filtration Plant ceased operation in 1962 when it was replaced by water filtration plants on the Patuxent and Potomac Rivers. Its water filtration and pumping facilities were removed, but the two Georgian Revival buildings and the dam remain. A historical marker identifies the location of the filtration plant and the site of the former Bealle's Mill at Burnt Mills.

Burnt Mills is home to a large population Orthodox and Conservative Jews. The Silver Spring Eruv Association includes parts of Burnt Mills / White Oak and the nearby neighborhoods of Kemp Mill and Colesville. Burnt Mills is home to an Orthodox synagogue, the Southeast Hebrew Congregation. Southeast Hebrew was originally founded by Orthodox Eastern European immigrants in 1909 on Capitol Hill in Washington, D.C. Many Jews began to move out of Southeast Washington beginning in the 1930s and Southeast Hebrew was relocated to White Oak in 1971.

== Demographics ==
Historical population
Census	Pop.	Note	%±
2020	3,592		—
U.S. Decennial Census; 2020

Burnt Mills first appeared as a census designated place in the 2020 U.S. census.

=== Racial and ethnic composition ===
Burnt Mills CDP, Maryland – Racial and ethnic composition Note: the US Census treats Hispanic/Latino as an ethnic category. This table excludes Latinos from the racial categories and assigns them to a separate category. Hispanics/Latinos may be of any race.
Race / Ethnicity (NH = Non-Hispanic)	Pop 2020	% 2020
White alone (NH)	1,069	29.76%
Black or African American alone (NH)	1,390	38.70%
Native American or Alaska Native alone (NH)	13	0.36%
Asian alone (NH)	253	7.04%
Native Hawaiian or Pacific Islander alone (NH)	1	0.03%
Other race alone (NH)	35	0.97%
Mixed race or Multiracial (NH)	88	2.45%
Hispanic or Latino (any race)	743	20.68%
Total	3,592	100.00%

=== 2020 census ===
As of the 2020 census, Burnt Mills had a population of 3,592. The median age was 38.7 years. 22.4% of residents were under the age of 18 and 15.1% of residents were 65 years of age or older. For every 100 females there were 100.3 males, and for every 100 females age 18 and over there were 97.4 males age 18 and over.

100.0% of residents lived in urban areas, while 0.0% lived in rural areas.

There were 1,088 households in Burnt Mills, of which 37.4% had children under the age of 18 living in them. Of all households, 55.1% were married-couple households, 13.1% were households with a male householder and no spouse or partner present, and 26.7% were households with a female householder and no spouse or partner present. About 20.1% of all households were made up of individuals and 9.3% had someone living alone who was 65 years of age or older.

There were 1,117 housing units, of which 2.6% were vacant. The homeowner vacancy rate was 0.2% and the rental vacancy rate was 2.7%.
