= John Codman Ropes =

American historian and lawyer (1836–1899)

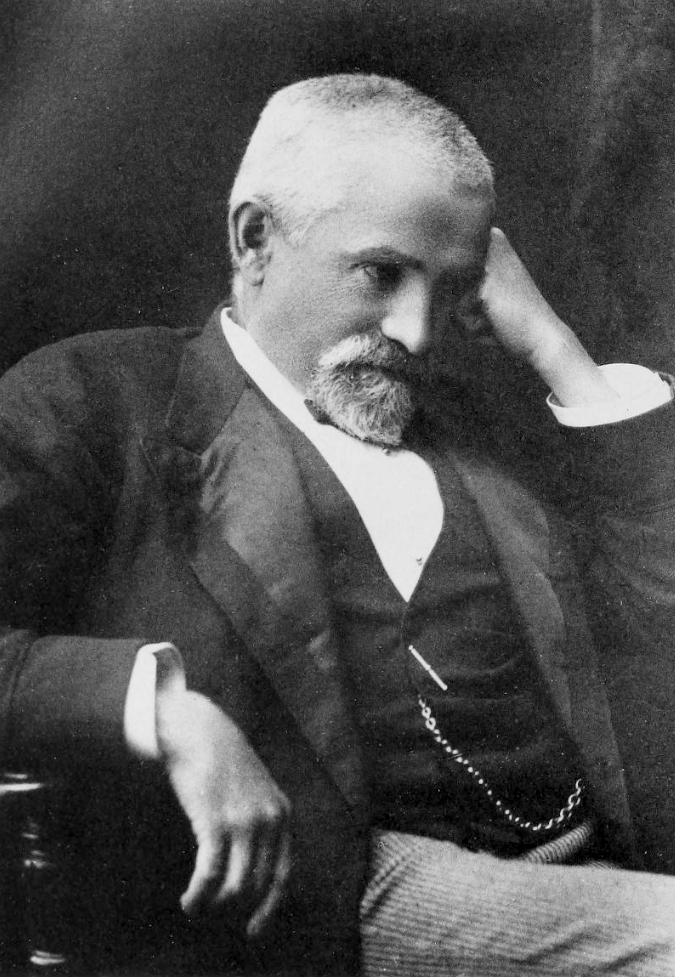
- Born: April 28, 1836; Saint Petersburg, Russia
- Died: October 28, 1899 (aged 63); Boston, Massachusetts, U.S.
- Education: Harvard University
- Occupations: Lawyer, historian

Signature
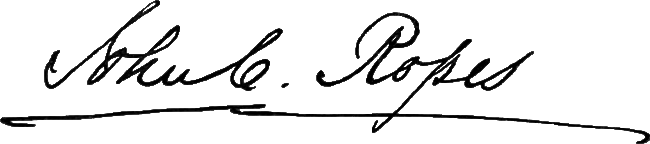

John Codman Ropes (April 28, 1836 – October 28, 1899) was an American military historian and lawyer, and the co-founder of the law firm Ropes & Gray.

== Early life ==
Ropes was born on April 28, 1836, in Saint Petersburg, the son of a leading merchant of Boston who was engaged in business in Russia. At the age of fourteen, his family having returned to Massachusetts, he developed an infection of the spine which eventually became a permanent deformity.

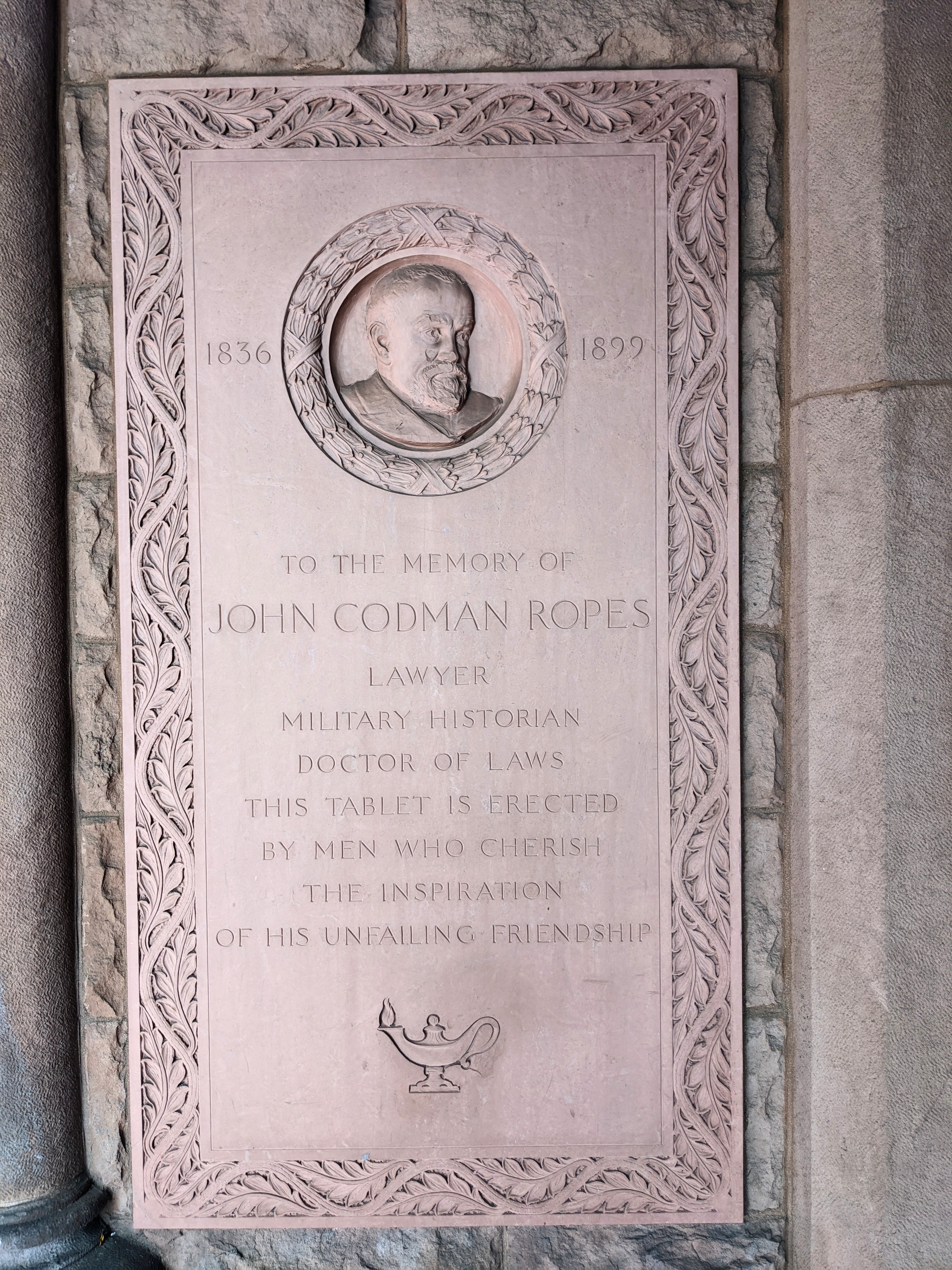
John Codman Ropes memorial plaque at Trinity Church in Boston

He entered Harvard in 1853 and graduated in 1857. During his time at Harvard, he was an early member of the Fly Club. His interests as a young man were chiefly religious, legal and historical, and these remained with him throughout life, his career as a lawyer being conspicuous and successful. But it was the outbreak of the American Civil War in 1861 which fixed his attention principally on military history. He ceaselessly assisted with business and personal help and friendship the officers and men of the 20th Massachusetts regiment, in which his brother, Henry Ropes, was killed in action at Gettysburg, and after the war he devoted himself to the collection and elucidation of all obtainable evidence as to its incidents and events. In 1865, he co-founded the Boston-based law firm Ropes & Gray with John Chipman Gray.

== Work ==
In this work his clear and unprejudiced legal mind enabled him to sift the truth from the innumerable public and private controversies, and the ill-informed allotment of praise and blame by the popular historians and biographers. The focus of his work was the Military Historical Society of Massachusetts, which he founded in 1876. The work of this society was the collection and discussion of evidence relating to the great conflict. Although practically every member of his society except himself had fought through the war, and many, such as Hancock and W. F. Smith, were general officers of great distinction, it was from first to last maintained and guided by Ropes, who presented to it his military library and his collection of prints and medals. He died at his home in Boston on October 28, 1899.

His principal work was an unfinished Story of the Civil War, to which he devoted most of his later years; this covers the years 1861–62. The Army under Pope is a detailed narration of the Virginia campaign of August–September 1862, which played a great part in reversing contemporary judgment on the events of those operations, notably as regards the unjustly-condemned General Fitz John Porter. Outside America, Ropes is known chiefly as the author of The Campaign of Waterloo, which is one of the standard works on the subject.

The greater part of his studies of the Civil War appears in the Military Historical Society's publications. Papers on the Waterloo campaign appeared in the Atlantic Monthly of June 1881, and in Scribner's Magazine of March and April 1888. Among his miscellaneous works is a paper on "The Likenesses of Julius Caesar" in Scribner's Magazine (February 1887).

== See also ==
- Ropes & Gray, law firm co-founded by Ropes
