= Marta Belcher =

American technology attorney

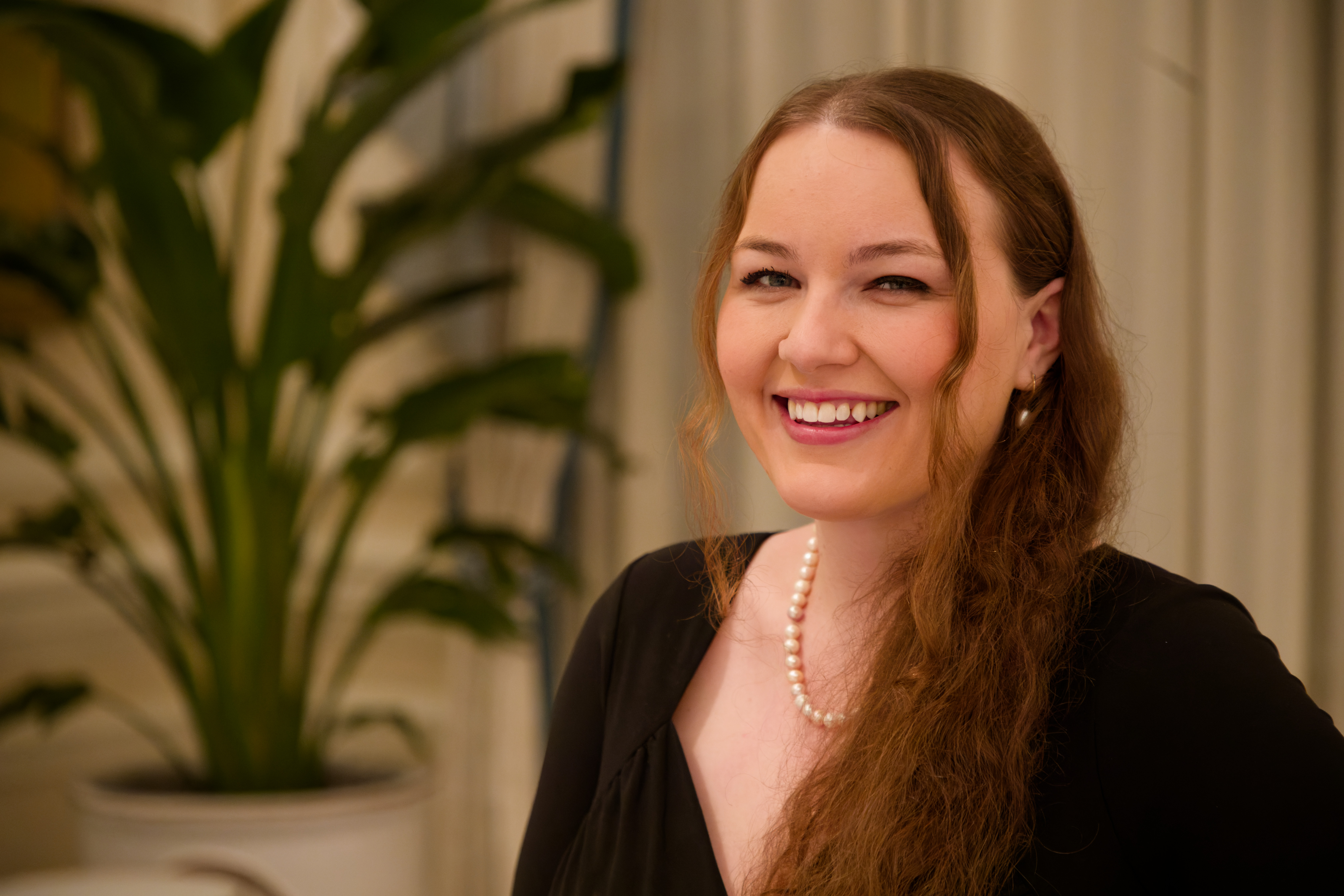
- Marta Belcher in 2024
- Born: Pasadena, California, United States
- Education: Stanford Law School, University of California, Berkeley
- Occupation: Technology attorney

Marta Francesca Belcher is an American technology attorney who has been called a pioneer in the area of blockchain law.

== Early life and education ==
Belcher was born in Pasadena, California and grew up in La Cañada Flintridge, California. Belcher received a B.A. in rhetoric, summa cum laude, from the University of California, Berkeley and a J.D. from Stanford Law School.

During college and law school, she served as the executive director of No Worries Now, a national nonprofit, for which she received numerous awards, including being named Huffington Post's Greatest Person of the Day.

At Stanford Law School, Belcher and two other students delivered a crowdsourced commencement speech written using an online wiki.

== Career ==
Belcher serves as general counsel of Protocol Labs and special counsel to the Electronic Frontier Foundation. As of 2025, she is the President & Chair of the Filecoin Foundation and its sister non-profit Filecoin Foundation for the Decentralized Web, President & Chair of the Board of Directors of the Blockchain Association, and serves on the Board of Directors of Creative Commons and the Zcash Foundation. She was previously an attorney focusing on blockchain and emerging technologies at Ropes & Gray in San Francisco.

Belcher has spoken about blockchain law around the world, including presenting three times in Davos during the World Economic Forum, testifying before the New York State Senate, and speaking in European Parliament, the OECD, the Horasis Global Meeting, and United States Congress.

Belcher serves as general counsel for one of the largest cryptocurrency projects, defended one of the first patent litigations against a blockchain company, and was recognized by the Financial Times Innovative Lawyer awards in 2018 for her pioneering work on the first blockchain-transferable software license and in 2019 for her work on the Protocol Labs Permissive License Stack. She also represents major blockchain industry groups and civil liberties organizations—including the Electronic Frontier Foundation and the Blockchain Association—in matters relating to blockchain and public policy.

Belcher has also represented public interest organizations in high-profile matters involving technology and civil liberties, including submitting briefs on behalf of the Electronic Frontier Foundation, Center for Democracy and Technology, Open Technology Institute, National Consumers League, and Cato Institute in the United States courts of appeals and Supreme Court of the United States.
