= Washington Suburban Sanitary Commission Police Department =

- Abbreviation: WSSC Water Police

Agency overview
- Formed: October 2002
- Annual budget: $5,336,375

Jurisdictional structure
- Operations jurisdiction: United States
- Legal jurisdiction: Montgomery County MD, Prince George's County MD, and the watershed area of Howard County MD
- General nature: Civilian police

Operational structure
- Headquarters: 14501 Sweitzer Lane Laurel, Maryland 20770
- Agency executive: Michael Delaney (Acting Chief)

Facilities
- Stations: 1

Website
- https://www.wsscwater.com/police

The Washington Suburban Sanitary Commission Police Department is a small full service police department located in the U.S. state of Maryland. Its main purpose is to protect water that runs through and around the water treatment plants operated by the Washington Suburban Sanitary Commission (WSSC). They also help the WSSC in traffic control, patrol parks, and assist other local agencies in calls for service as necessary. The WSSC is a bi-county government agency that serves Montgomery County and Prince George's County, both bordering the US federal district of Washington, D.C.. The police have full jurisdiction within those counties as well as the watershed area of Howard County.

== History ==
The WSSC Police was founded in October of 2002 as a result of the attacks on 9/11. The Maryland legislature found the police force necessary to help combat terrorist threats and acts on WSSC's infrastructure.

== Patrol ==
The Washington Suburban Sanitary Commission Police patrol more than 1,000 square miles of the WSSC's Sanitary District located in Montgomery and Prince George's County. Within that district they also serve more than 250 fixed facilitates and protect 6,000 acres of WSSC Watershed property located in Howard County. The WSSC Water Police is responsible for ensuring the safety and protections of more than 100,000 visitors that travel through the WSSC's recreational areas each year. WSSC Water Police primarily ride in patrol vehicles, but also patrol by foot, use 4x4 vehicles, boats, and all-terrain vehicles.

== Investigative section ==
The investigative section of the Washington Suburban Sanitary Commission Police Department is tasked with looking into any criminal, civil, or administrative infractions that take place against or on WSSC property in Prince George's, Montgomery, and Howard Counties, Maryland. Additionally, the Investigative Section is in charge of granting security clearance to anyone requesting access to WSSC property, facilities, and data that they require to carry out business inside the WSSC's district.
