= Ropes & Gray =

American multinational law firm

Ropes & Gray LLP
- Headquarters: Prudential Tower; Boston, Massachusetts; United States
- No. of offices: 16
- No. of attorneys: ~1,600 (2025)
- Major practice areas: Alternative Asset Opportunities; Asset Management; Business Restructuring; Data, Privacy, and Cybersecurity; Employment, Executive Comp, and Employee Benefits; Life Sciences Regulatory & Compliance; Litigation & Enforcement; Mergers & Acquisitions; Private Equity; Real Estate; Tax
- Key people: Julie Jones; (Chair); Neill Jakobe; (Vice Chair)
- Revenue: $3.737 billion (2025)
- Date founded: 1865
- Founder: John Codman Ropes; John Chipman Gray
- Company type: Limited liability partnership
- Website: ropesgray.com

Ropes & Gray LLP is an American multinational law firm. It was founded in 1865 in Boston by John Codman Ropes and John Chipman Gray. The firm has over 1,500 lawyers and about 1,300 employees worldwide, with 16 offices across the United States, Asia, and Europe. Its clientele consists mainly of corporations, financial institutions, government agencies, universities, and health care organizations.

== History ==
=== Founding to 20th century (1865–2000) ===
The firm was founded in 1865 by two Harvard Law School graduates, John Codman Ropes and John Chipman Gray, Jr.. In 1878, William Loring, also a Harvard graduate, joined the firm, and it was renamed "Ropes, Gray and Loring" until Loring's departure in 1899, when he was appointed to the Massachusetts Supreme Judicial Court, and the firm was renamed as "Ropes, Gray and Gorham" with the addition of Robert Gorham. Following Gorham’s death, the firm was renamed Ropes, Gray, Boyden & Perkins in 1914, adding Roland Boyden and Thomas Perkins as name partners.

The firm began with representation of, mainly, individuals, and Harvard University. With the addition of Loring, in 1878, the New York and New England Railroad became a client, and the firm began its shift to corporate law, growing to 11 lawyers and 15 staff by 1910.

The firm grew during the 20th century, developing a bankruptcy practice during the Great Depression, a labor practice in response to The New Deal, and adding financial reports to its services after the creation of the SEC.

In 1940, the firm's name was changed to Ropes, Gray, Best, Coolidge & Rugg, until 1961, when its original name, "Ropes & Gray" was again adopted.

In 1942, a book written by Albert Boyden, which chronicles the history of the firm, was published under the title Ropes-Gray, 1865-1940.

=== 21st century ===
In 2003, the firm acquired New York City based private equity law firm Reboul, MacMurray, Hewitt & Maynard. In 2005, it acquired NYC-based intellectual property law firm Fish & Neave. Two years later, the firm opened its first international office in Tokyo, followed by an office in London, in 2010.

In 2012, the Korean Bar Association approved Ropes & Gray as the first Foreign Legal Consultant Office in Korean history, allowing the firm to open an eleventh office, in Seoul. At the time, Ropes & Gray had 1,100 lawyers and had expanded its presence in Asia with offices in Hong Kong, Shanghai, and in Tokyo.

In 2023, the firm opened an office in Dublin, Ireland. Later that year, in July, Ropes & Gray announced the relocation of some Shanghai-based lawyers to its Hong Kong operation and the launch of an office in Singapore.

In November 2023, amid antisemitic incidents at U.S. law schools, Ropes & Gray was among a group of law firms that sent a letter to law school deans warning them that an escalation in incidents targeting Jewish students would have corporate hiring consequences. The letter stated: "We look to you to ensure your students who hope to join our firms after graduation are prepared to be an active part of workplace communities that have zero tolerance policies for any form of discrimination or harassment, much less the kind that has been taking place on some law school campuses."

In 2024, the firm, previously 16th, was ranked 24th in the London Stock Exchange Group's global M&A legal advisor rankings, reflecting more than 200 deals valued at $136.8 billion.

In September 2025, Ropes & Gray opened its fourth European office, in Milan, raising its office count to 16, with seven U.S. offices, in Boston, New York, Chicago, Los Angeles, Washington, D.C., San Francisco, and Palo Alto, and other international offices in Tokyo, Hong Kong, Shanghai, Seoul, Singapore, Dublin, London, and Paris.

== Leadership ==
In 2017, Ropes & Gray elected Julie Jones as chair. After serving as chair-elect for two years, Jones took the helm in January 2020 as the first woman to chair the firm. Jones arrived at the firm in 1994 from Cornell Law School. She is an M&A partner and private equity specialist with a focus on transactions in the healthcare and technology industries. She led the firm's securities and public companies group from 2006 to 2011 and has been on the firm's management committee since 2011. From 2020 to 2023, only three years since taking the lead role, the firm's revenue was $3 billion with profits per equity partner at $4.5 million. That was an increase from 2019, the year before Jones became chair, when the firm's revenue was $1.9 billion with profits per equity partner at $2.8 million. In 2024, Jones was re-elected to a second five-year term.

Also in 2024, Ropes & Gray partner Neill Jakobe was elected vice chair for a five-year term that began in January 2025. He had been co-head of the firm’s global private equity practice and a member of the management committee.

== Practice areas ==
Ropes & Gray's practice areas include:

- Antitrust
- Appellate Practice
- Asset Management
- Business Restructuring
- Capital Markets
- Corporate Law
- Data, Privacy, & Cybersecurity
- Employee Benefits (ERISA) Law
- Employment Law
- Finance
- Healthcare
- Life Sciences
- Intellectual Property
- Investment Banking
- Investment Management
- Litigation & Enforcement
- Mergers & Acquisitions
- Private Equity
- Real Estate Law
- Securities
- Tax Law
- Technology

== Notable clients and cases ==
=== Cases litigated by Ropes & Gray include ===
- Firm partner Joan McPhee defending former BP engineer Kurt Mix against obstruction of justice charges related to the 2010 BP Deepwater Horizon oil spill, with charges dropped in 2015.
- Representing the plaintiffs in Obergefell v. Hodges, in 2015. Attorney Doug Hallward-Driemeier argued before the U.S. Supreme Court that states must recognize same-sex marriages performed elsewhere.
- Representing Gawker in its 2016 Chapter 11 filing.
- Defending physicians' First Amendment rights in Wollschlaeger v. Governor of Florida, in 2017. The case concerned a Florida law banning doctors from inquiring about patients’ gun ownership.
- Commissioned by the U.S. Olympic Committee to independently investigate abuse allegations by former USA Gymnastics national team doctor Larry Nassar. The firm released its report, "The Constellation of Factors Underlying Larry Nassar's Abuse of Athletes", in December 2018.
- Representing Willkie Farr & Gallagher (then) co-chairman Gordon Caplan, JD, who was arrested in March 2019 as a parent participant in the 2019 college admissions bribery scandal. Caplan was represented by firm partners Joshua S. Levy and Michael McGovern. Leslie Wright, an Assistant United States Attorney who prosecuted the case, is a Ropes & Gray alumna.
- Representing Harris Associates in March 2010, with the Supreme Court's ruling in Jones v. Harris Associates establishing the standard governing claims of excessive mutual fund fees under § 36(b) of the Investment Company Act of 1940.

=== Firm lawyers have advised companies on business transactions including ===
- Bain Capital acquisitions, in 2008, of Clear Channel Communications, with Thomas H. Lee, for $26 billion, and The Weather Channel, with Blackstone Group, and its 2009 purchase of Bellsystem24
- TPG Capital and the Canadian Pension Plan Investment Board's $5.2 billion acquisition of IMS Health Inc., in 2009
- Genzyme Corporation's $2.9 billion deal with Bayer Schering Pharma AG, in 2010.
- NSTAR's 2010 merger with Northeast Utilities for $7.1 billion
- TPG Capital's 2010 acquisition of J.Crew for $3 billion
- Bare Escentuals 2010 merger with Shiseido of Japan, for $1.7 billionl
- Bain Capital's 2011 majority acquisition of MYOB for $1.3 billion
- Genzyme's 2011 acquisition by Sanofi-Aventis, for $20.1 billion
- China Everbright, in a 2012 acquisition, with Carlyle Group and other partners, of Focus Media, in a $3.5 billion transaction
- Berkshire Partners' 2012 acquisition of Lightower Fiber Networks and Sidera Networks for $2 billion
- Crown Castle International's 2017 acquisition of Lightower Fiber Networks for about $7.1 billion
- Bain Capital's 2018 sale by Toshiba Corp. of its semiconductor business to a group that included Apple, Seagate, Kingston, Hoya, Dell Technologies, and SK Hynix, valued at approximately $18 billion
- Inspire Brands' 2020 acquisition of Dunkin' Donuts, for $11.3 billion
- Altimeter Growth Corp., in its 2021 merger to take Grab public for $39.6 billion, the largest SPAC merger to date
- Bain Capital's 2022 $3.1 billion acquisition of Evident Corporation from Olympus Corp.
- Intermediate Capital Group's (ICG) 2023 sale of investment in Visma and reinvestment into Visma and partial sale of investment in Iris Software Group
- Nippon Steel Corporation's 2023 agreement to purchase U.S. Steel for $14 billion
- Advised National Amusements, Inc. (NAI) during its sale to affiliates of the Ellison Family and Redbird Capital Partners for $2.4 billion in the Paramount-Skydance Merger in 2024
- Bain Capital's 2024 $4.5 billion acquisition of Envestnet, $5.6 billion acquisition of PowerSchool, and sale of Zellis Group to Apax Partners
- Aon's 2024 $2.4 billion sale of NFP Wealth Business to Madison Dearborn Partners
- Blackstone Real Estate Debt Strategies' 2025 (BREDS) $2 billion acquisition and financing of commercial real estate loan portfolio from Atlantic Union Bank
- HPS Corporate Lending Fund's 2025 $1.1 billion bond offering
- ImmunoGen advisement in its 2023 $10.1 billion acquisition by Abbvie Inc.
- TPG advisement in its 2023 purchase of Nextech for $1.4 billion
- BPEA EQT's 2023 $6.5 billion merger of Vistra with Tricor
- Bain Capital Private Equity and Bain Capital Double Impact 2024 advisement in the $1.5 billion sale of Japan Wind Development to Infroneer Holdings
- Xerox Holdings Corporation's 2024 $1.5 billion acquisition of Lexmark International, Inc.
- Novo Nordisk’s 2025 $2 billion license agreement with United Laboratories International Holdings Limited and its subsidiary United Bio-Technology (Hengqin) Co. Ltd.
- Walgreens Boots Alliance advisement in its 2025 $23.7 billion purchase by Sycamore Partners
- EQT Private Capital Asia's 2025 $14.5 billion acquisition of Nord Anglia Education
- Bain Capital's 2025 $3.3 billion acquisition of Mitsubishi Tanabe Pharma Corporation (MTPC)
- Kodiak Robotics $2.5 billion business combination with Ares Acquisition Corporation II in 2025
- Becton Dickinson and Co. 2024 advisement on the $4.2 billion purchase of Edwards Lifesciences’ critical care product group
- EQT Private Capital's 2024 $1.1 billion acquisition of PropertyGuru
- Legends Hospitality's 2024 acquisition of ASM Global
- Partners Group's 2024 €6.7 billion acquisition of Techem
- Cardinal Health's 2024 $1.1 billion acquisition of Integrated Oncology Network
- Sanofi's 2025 acquisition of Dren bio's deep B-cell depleter program through the acquisition of Dren Bio's affiliate Dren-0201 for $1.9 billion
- Cressey & Company's 2025 investment in Paradigm Health
- Sunstone Partners and Cressey & Company's 2025 investment in ProgenyHealth, LLC
- JPMorgan counsel, which advised Beacon Roofing Supply in its 2025 $11 billion sale to QXO
- Advised on U.S. and UK aspects of Altice France S.A. and Altice France Holding S.A. balance sheet restructuring of over €24 billion of debt, in 2025
- Evident Corporation's 2025 $1.8 billion sale of Inspection Technologies division to Wabtec Corporation
- NIQ Global Intelligence's $1.1 billion IPO in 2025
- New Mountain Capital and Francisco Partners $1.8 billion growth investment in Office Ally
- Pamlico Capital's 2025 $1.75 billion fund formation
- TPG Capital's 2025 $7.5 billion acquisition of AT&T's remaining 70% stake in DirecTV
- Bain Capital's 2025 $5.4 billion acquisition of certain supermarkets and retail outlets from Seven & i Holdings
- Brahma's 2025 $1.43 billion acquisition of Metaphysic
- Novo Nordisk's 2025 $1 billion License Agreement with Lexicon Pharmaceuticals
- Commonwealth Financial Network $2.7 billion sale to LPL Financial Holdings Inc. in 2025

== Recognition ==
In 2025, the firm was ranked in multiple practice areas in Chambers Global and Chambers USA and was listed in Vault’s Best Law Firms to Work For. At the California Legal Awards, Georgina Jones Suzuki was recognized among the Women Leaders in Tech Law and Intellectual Property Honorees. The firm received an IFLR Americas Award for advising on First Quantum Minerals’ $1.6 billion high-yield offering. LMG Life Sciences recognized the firm as Licensing & Collaboration Firm of the Year in the Americas in 2024 and Venture Capital Firm of the Year in the EMEA region in 2025. The American Lawyer ranked Ropes & Gray second on its A-List in 2025, its fourth consecutive year in the top three.

== Notable current and former attorneys ==
=== Founding & named partners ===
- John Chipman Gray (founding partner), property law scholar
- John Codman Ropes (founding partner), military historian
- William Loring (named partner), Associate Justice of the Massachusetts Supreme Judicial Court; Harvard Law School professor; general counsel of the New York and New England Railroad
- Robert Gorham (1888)
- Roland Boyden (1894)
- Thomas Nelson Perkins (1897)
- William H. Best (1907)
- Charles Coolidge (1922)
- Charles Rugg (1933)

=== Chair and vice chair ===
- Julie Jones - Chair, first woman to lead Ropes & Gray
- Neill Jakobe - Vice Chair, was co-head of the firm's global private equity practice

=== Current partners include ===
- Mark Barnes (partner), activist, academic, former Chief Research Compliance Officer at Harvard University
- Joshua S. Levy (partner), United States Attorney for the District of Massachusetts
- Robert P. Silvers, Under Secretary of Homeland Security for Strategy, Policy, and Plans
- Jane Willis (partner), a member of the MIT Blackjack Team
- R. Bradford Malt (chairman, 2004–19), sole trustee of Mitt Romney’s blind trusts during his tenure as Governor and two presidential campaigns

=== Former partners include ===
- Eleanor D. Acheson (associate 1974–83; partner, 1983–93), Amtrak executive; Assistant Attorney General of the United States
- Diane Bemus Patrick (partner), First Lady of Massachusetts (2007–15)
- Elliot Richardson (associate, 1949–53, 1955–57; partner, 1961–65); U.S. Secretary of Health, Education and Welfare (1970–73); U.S. Secretary of Defense (1973); U.S. Attorney General (1973); U.S. Ambassador to the United Kingdom (1975–76); U.S. Secretary of Commerce (1976–77)
- John Richardson (1911–1970s; hiring partner), Republican National Committeeman from Massachusetts (1932–36)
- James Vorenberg (associate, 1954–60; partner, 1960–62), Dean of the Faculty of Law of Harvard University
- Dalila Argaez Wendlandt (partner), Associate Justice of the Massachusetts Supreme Judicial Court
- Keith Wofford, partner

=== Judiciary ===
- Michael P. Allen, Judge of the United States Court of Appeals for Veterans Claims
- Janis M. Berry (partner, 1986–97), Associate Justice of the Massachusetts Appeals Court
- Levin H. Campbell, Chief Judge of the United States Court of Appeals for the First Circuit
- Jennifer Choe-Groves, Judge of the United States Court of International Trade
- Bessie Dewar (associate), Associate Justice of the Massachusetts Supreme Judicial Court
- Olin M. Jeffords (associate, 1919–21), Chief Justice of the Vermont Supreme Court

=== Government and politics ===
- Michael J. Astrue, associate (1984–85), poet, and Commissioner of the Social Security Administration
- William Birdthistle (associate, 2001–06), director of the Securities and Exchange Commission Division of Investment Management
- Robert F. Bradford, 57th Governor of Massachusetts
- Allison G. Catheron, member of the Massachusetts House of Representatives
- Archibald Cox (associate, 1938–45), U.S. Solicitor General and special prosecutor for the Watergate scandal
- John Demers (associate, 2000–03), United States Associate Attorney General for the United States Department of Justice National Security Division
- Rebecca Haffajee (associate), acting Assistant Secretary of Health and Human Services for Planning and Evaluation
- George S. Hawkins, general manager of the DC Water and Sewer Authority
- Horace Hildreth, 59th Governor of Maine
- Nikolas P. Kerest (associate, 2001–04), United States Attorney for the District of Vermont
- Cheryl LaFleur, commissioner of the Federal Energy Regulatory Commission
- Henry Cabot Lodge (associate, 1875–80), United States Senator from Massachusetts
- Heather Sanborn (associate), the Maine Public Advocate, previously was a member of the Maine House of Representatives and a member of the Maine Senate
- Henry Lee Shattuck, member of the Massachusetts House of Representatives, member of the Boston City Council; philanthropist
- Christopher Taylor (associate), Mayor of Ann Arbor, Michigan
- Robert Troyer (associate, 1990–93), United States Attorney for the District of Colorado
- Louis C. Wyman, (associate) United States Senator and United States Representative from New Hampshire
- Henry Adams, historian; member of the Adams political family
- Brooks Adams, historian; member of the Adams political family
- George H. Lyman (associate), chairman of the Massachusetts Republican state committee and Collector of the Port of Boston
- Frederick Charles Lough, decorated veteran of World War II; brigadier general in the United States Army

=== Academia/education ===
- Yochai Benkler (associate, 1994–95), professor at Harvard Law School
- Robert C. Clark (associate, 1972–74), Dean of the Faculty of Law at Harvard University
- Lee M. Friedman (associate, 1895–97), lawyer and historian
- Theodore Ruger, dean of the University of Pennsylvania School of Law
- Clayton Spencer (associate, 1986–1989), president of Bates College
- David O. Stewart, author

=== Other notable fields/diverse disciplines ===
- Marta Belcher (attorney), blockchain law pioneer
- Eric Bjornlund, co-founder of Democracy International
- John F. Bok (associate, 1955–c. 1960s), Boston municipal lawyer
- Joan Toland Bok (associate, 1955–59), chair of New England Electric and director of Avery Dennison
- Isabelle Kinsolving (associate, 2012–22), member of the 2004 United States Olympic rowing team
- John Kingston III (associate), general counsel of Affiliated Managers Group
- John Palfrey (associate, 2001–02), president of the John D. and Catherine T. MacArthur Foundation
- Charles Soule, comic book writer for Marvel Comics

== See also ==
- List of largest United States-based law firms by profits per partner
- White-shoe firms
