= William Birdthistle =

American legal scholar, financial regulator

William A. Birdthistle
- Born: William Anthony Birdthistle; 20 October 1973 (age 52); Cork City, County Cork, Ireland
- Occupations: Director, Division of Investment Management, U.S. Securities and Exchange Commission

Academic background
- Education: Duke University, BA, 1995; Harvard Law School, JD, 1999; University of Chicago, MA, History, 2021

Academic work
- Discipline: Corporate Law, Securities Regulation
- Institutions: Securities and Exchange Commission; Chicago-Kent College of Law; Ropes & Gray

William A. Birdthistle (born 20 October 1973) is a law professor at the University of Chicago Law School. He served as the Director of the Division of Investment Management at the U.S. Securities and Exchange Commission from 2021 to 2024.

== Early life and education ==
Birdthistle was born in Cork, Ireland, and is a citizen of both the Republic of Ireland and the United States. He spent eight years living in Brega, Libya, and nine years in Kuala Lumpur, Malaysia, before coming to the United States in 1991 for his undergraduate studies.

He attended Duke University for his Bachelor of Arts degrees in English and psychology, where he graduated summa cum laude in 1995. He then enrolled at Harvard Law School for his Juris Doctor and served as managing editor of the Harvard Law Review, graduating in 1999.

In 2019, he matriculated at the University of Chicago, where he received an MA in history in 2021 and is currently working on a PhD in history.

== Career ==
Birdthistle spent a year as Judicial Clerk to the Honorable Diarmuid O'Scannlain. He was then an attorney at the Boston law firm of Ropes & Gray from 2001 to 2006. He joined the faculty at Chicago-Kent College of Law in 2006, and received tenure in 2011, when he also won Chicago-Kent's Excellence in Teaching Award.

From 2016 through 2020, Birdthistle served as a visiting professor of law and lecturer in law at the University of Chicago Law School, where he won the Graduating Students Award for Teaching Excellence in 2019.

On 21 December 2021, the Wall Street Journal reported that Birdthistle would join the Securities and Exchange Commission as director of the division of investment management.

Birdthistle joined the faculty at the University of Chicago Law School in April 2024.

== Selected publications ==
- Birdthistle, William A. (2016) Empire of the Fund: The Way We Save Now. Oxford University Press.
- Birdthistle, William A. (2018) Research Handbook on the Regulation of Mutual Funds. Edward Elgar Press (co-edited with John D. Morley).
