= Eric Bjornlund =

American lawyer

- Born: August 7, 1958 (age 67); Pittsburgh, Pennsylvania, U.S.
- Education: Phillips Exeter Academy; Williams College; Columbia Law School (JD); Harvard Kennedy School (MPA)
- Occupation: Lawyer

Eric Bjornlund (born August 7, 1958) is an American expert in democratization assistance and election observation and co-founder and president of Democracy International and the author of Beyond Free and Fair: Monitoring Elections and Building Democracy. Bjornlund is also a lawyer and adjunct professor at Georgetown University.

== Early life and education ==
Eric Bjornlund was born on August 7, 1958, in Pittsburgh, Pennsylvania. He graduated from Phillips Exeter Academy in Exeter, New Hampshire. He majored in economics at Williams College, earned a J.D. from Columbia Law School, and earned a M.P.A. from John F. Kennedy School of Government at Harvard University.

== Career ==
From 1984 to 1988, Bjornlund practiced corporate and international law at Ropes & Gray in Boston, Massachusetts. In 1989, he traveled to several countries in Africa with a delegation led by Michael Kennedy, then-head of Citizens Energy. Later that year he observed transitional elections in Namibia and authored a report on Nation Building: The UN and Namibia.

In 2003, along with Glenn Cowan, Bjornlund co-founded Democracy International, a U.S.-based firm that provides technical assistance, analytical services, and project implementation for democracy and governance, human rights, peace and resilience, and other international development programs worldwide. Nominated in 2016 by USAID Administrator Gayle Smith to serve on the Advisory Committee On Voluntary Foreign Aid (ACVFA), Bjornlund provided advice to USAID—both during the Administration of President Barack Obama and during the transition from Administrator Smith to USAID Administrator Mark Green—on critical development and foreign assistance issues. In 2010 he became adjunct professor in the Department of Government at Georgetown University where he teaches in the graduate program in Democracy and Governance and serves on the program's executive Advisory Board. He was chosen as a member of the Executive Advisory Board of the Council of International Development Companies; serves as Co-Chair of the Democracy, Rights, and Governance Workgroup of the Society for International Development-Washington; and recently joined the U.S. State Department Conflict and Stabilization Operations Advisory Committee.

He has served as an expert in democratization and international development at the Woodrow Wilson International Center for Scholars, the American Political Science Association, UNDP, the OSCE, and USIP, among others. He has lectured at Yale University, Johns Hopkins University, American University, Boston College, George Washington University, and Georgetown, among others, as well as at universities and institutions in more than twenty countries around the world, and he has appeared often as an expert commentator on television and radio in the U.S. and abroad, including on the BBC, C-SPAN, CNN, National Public Radio, Voice of America, and other media outlets.

He led missions to observe elections around the world—including in Afghanistan, Cambodia, Egypt, El Salvador, Hong Kong, Indonesia, Kenya, and Pakistan—as well as assessments and evaluations in Egypt. Bjornlund led the effort to create the Advancing Democratic Elections and Political Transitions (ADEPT) Consortium, a partnership of The Asia Foundation, The Carter Center, Democracy International, Freedom House, IREX, and World Learning. In 2015, Democracy International was selected by the Fairfax County Chamber of Commerce GovCon Awards as a finalist for Contractor of the Year for a company of its size. As part of Democracy International's continued expansion, Bjornlund also oversees the growing Countering Violent Extremism practice.

He supported democratic political transitions in Africa, Asia, and the Middle East in the 1980s and 1990s working in various senior positions for the National Democratic Institute for International Affairs (NDI). Among other roles, he directed NDI's program in support of democratic Palestinian elections in 1995-96 and directed a program to support the democratic transition in Indonesia in 1998-2000. He later ran programs in support of democratic consolidation and elections in Indonesia for The Carter Center and Democracy International. Bjornlund was a Fellow at the Woodrow Wilson International Center for Scholars from 2000 to 2001.

In 2004, Bjornlund published Beyond Free and Fair: Monitoring Elections and Building Democracy. The work was described by Thomas Carothers as "a masterful, field-defining work [...] packed with insights about how to do better."

In 2017, Bjornlund co-founded the non-profit Election Reformers Network with a group of international development experts working to strengthen American democracy with a specific focus on the implementation of ranked-choice voting. Bjornlund was named the organization's first Board Chair.

=== Testimony ===
An incomplete list of Bjornlund's testimony includes:

- “Egypt Two Years After Morsi (Part II),” House Committee on Foreign Affairs, Subcommittee on the Middle East and North Africa, December 16, 2015.
- “Supporting the Democratic Transition Process in Indonesia,” House Committee on International Relations, Subcommittee on Asia and the Pacific (February 16, 2000)
- “Cambodia: Where Do We Go From Here?,” House Committee on International Relations, Subcommittee on Asia and the Pacific (September 28, 1998)
- “Shattered Dream: The Uncertain State of Democracy in Cambodia,” House Committee on International Relations, Subcommittee on Asia and the Pacific (February 26, 1998)
- “Democratic Continuity and Change in South Asia,” House Committee on International Relations, Subcommittee on Asia and the Pacific (March 12, 1997)
- “United States Assistance Programs in Asia,” House Committee on International Relations, Subcommittees on Asia and the Pacific and on International Operations and Human Rights (March 16, 1995)
- “The Role of the International Community in Elections in South Africa,” Special Political and Decolonization Committee, United Nations (November 8, 1993)

=== Bibliography ===
- Vote Count Verification: A User’s Guide for Funders, Implementers, and Stakeholders, with G. Cowan (Democracy International, 2011).
- Beyond Free and Fair: Monitoring Elections and Building Democracy (Woodrow Wilson Center and Johns Hopkins University Press, 2004) (Arabic edition, Egyptian Society for Dissemination of Understanding and Cultural Knowledge, 2013).
- Making Every Vote Count: Domestic Election Monitoring in Asia, principal author, with D. Timberman (National Democratic Institute and National Citizens Movement for Free Elections, 1996) (translated into Bahasa Indonesia).
- The New Democratic Frontier: A Country-By-Country Report on Elections in Central and Eastern Europe, editor, with L. Garber (National Democratic Institute, 1992) (translated into Hungarian).
- Nation Building: The U.N. and Namibia (National Democratic Institute, 1990).
