= Blue Plains Advanced Wastewater Treatment Plant =

Wastewater treatment plant in Washington, D.C.

Coordinates: 38.82°N 77.02°W

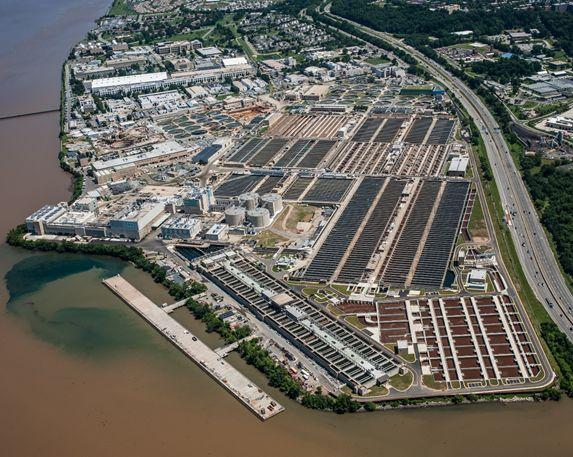
Aerial view of Blue Plains in 2016

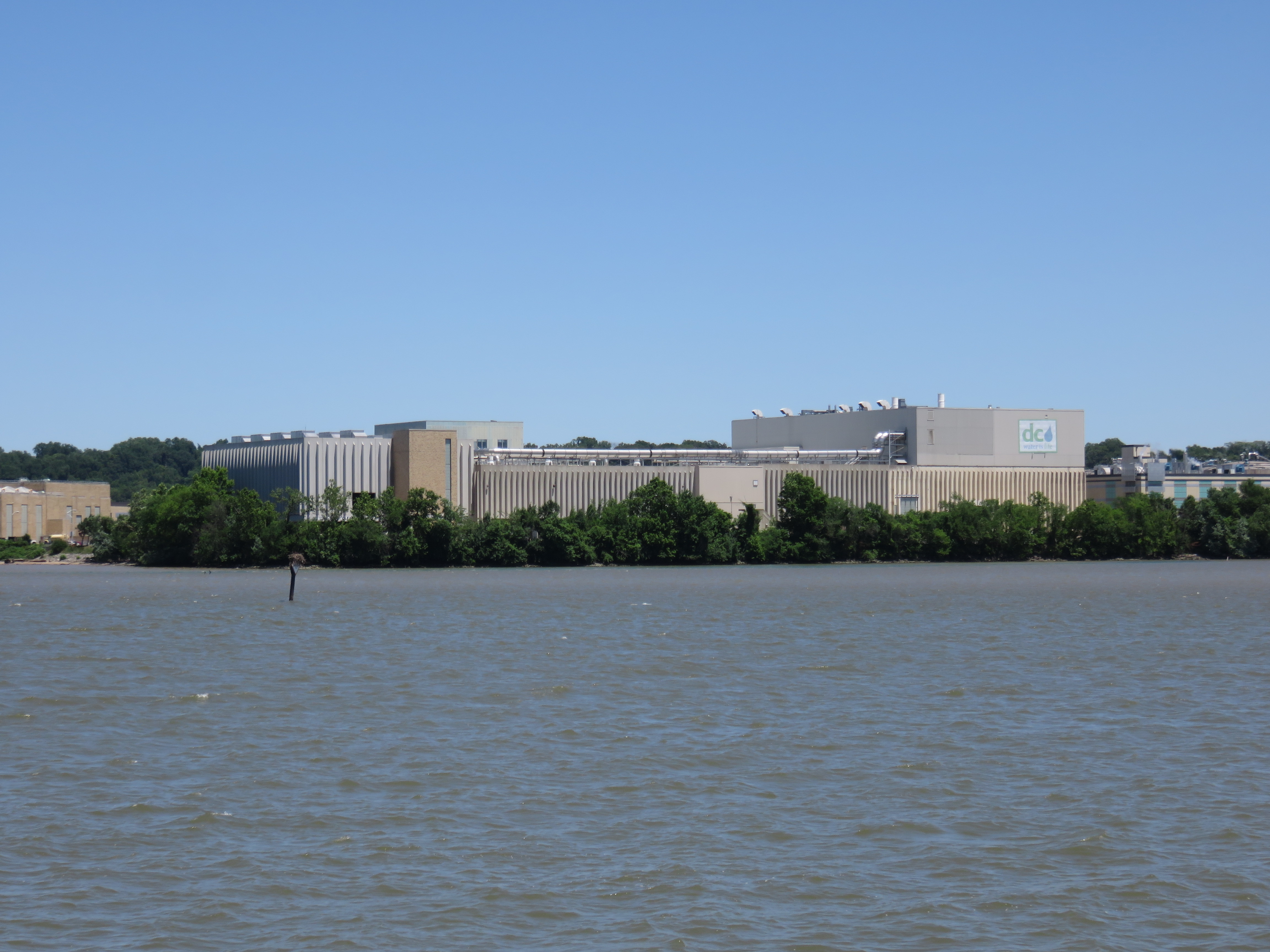
Main building seen from the Potomac River in 2019

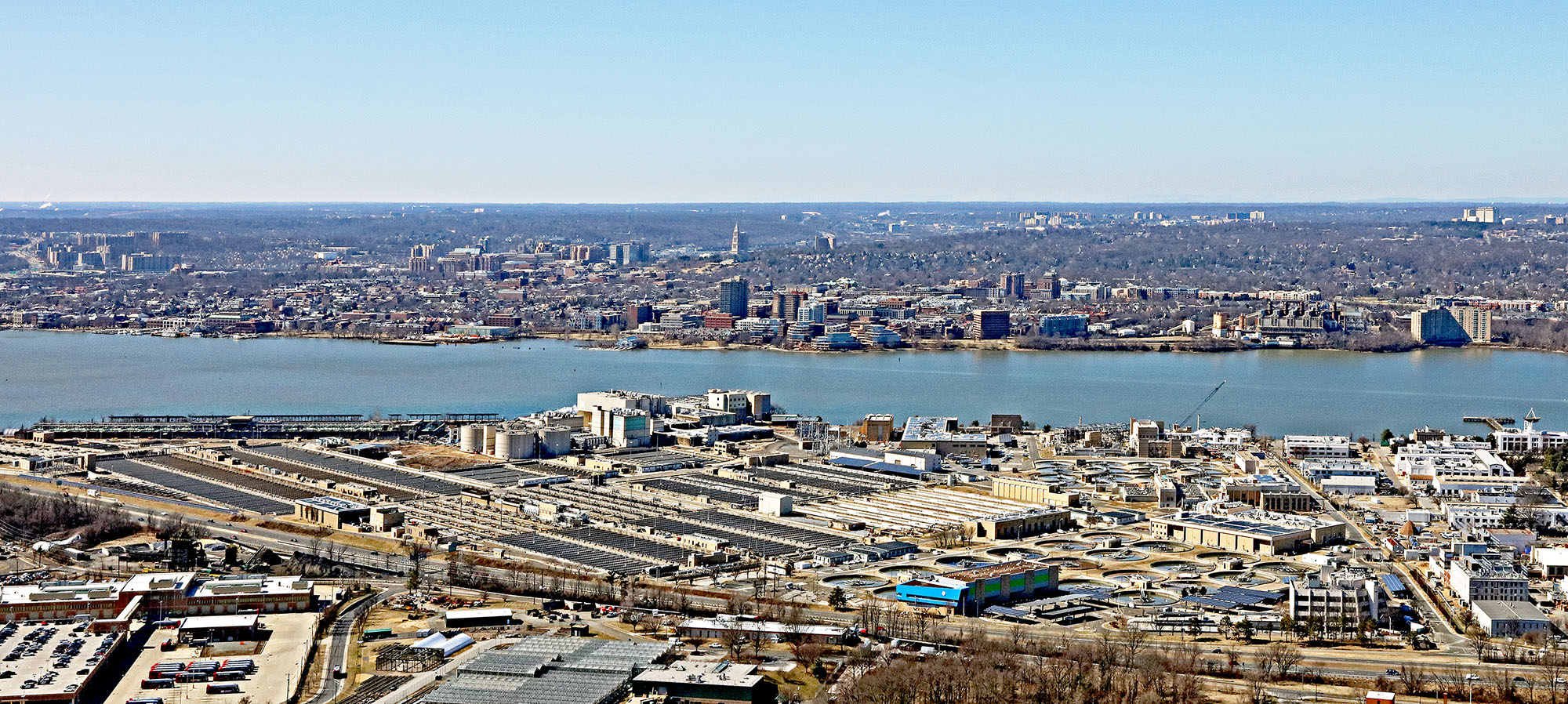
Aerial view of Blue Plains in 2022

Blue Plains Advanced Wastewater Treatment Plant in Washington, D.C., is the largest advanced wastewater treatment plant in the world. The facility is operated by the District of Columbia Water and Sewer Authority (DC Water). The plant opened in 1937 as a primary treatment facility, and advanced treatment capacity was added in the 1970s and 1980s. The effluent that leaves Blue Plains is discharged to the Potomac River and meets some of the most stringent permit limits in the United States.

== Current operations ==
=== Capacity and service area ===
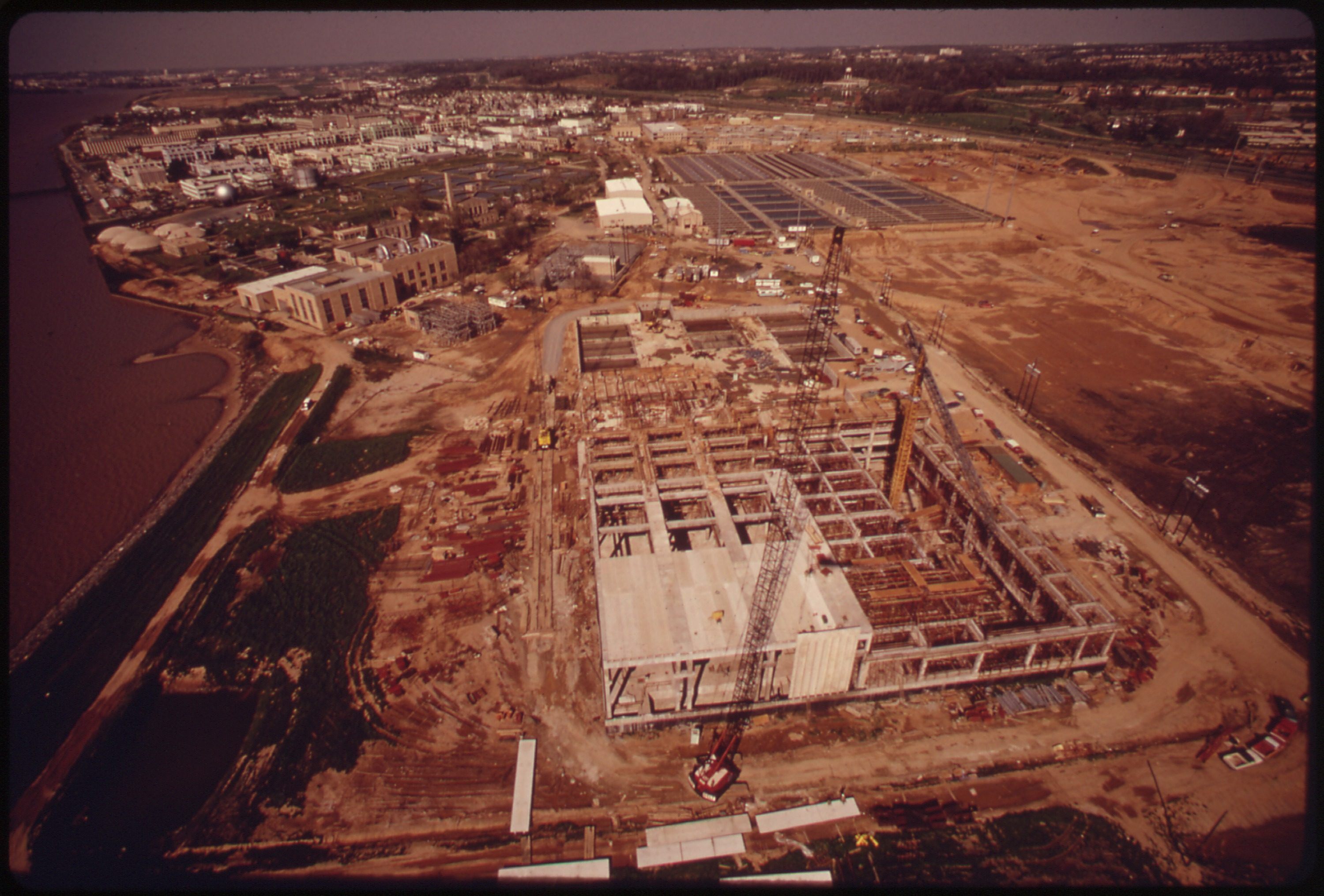
Expansion of the plant in the 1970s

The plant has a treatment capacity of 384 million gallons per day (mgd) or 1.45 billion liters per day, with a peak capacity (partial treatment during large storms) of over 1 billion gallons per day (3.8 billion liters/day). The plant occupies 153 acres (0.62 km^{2}) in the southwest quadrant of Washington, D.C., and discharges to the Potomac River. It serves over 1.6 million customers in Washington, large portions of adjacent Prince George's County and Montgomery County in Maryland, and portions of Fairfax County and Loudoun County in Virginia.

=== Nutrient pollution control ===
Wastewater treatment plants historically have contributed nutrients such as phosphorus and nitrogen to the waterways in which they discharge. These nutrients deplete oxygen and cause algal blooms in rivers and coastal waters, a process that is detrimental to fish and other aquatic life.

Since the mid-1980s, Blue Plains has reduced its phosphorus discharges to the limit of technology, primarily in support of water quality goals of the Potomac River, but also for the restoration of the Chesapeake Bay. The 1987 Chesapeake Bay Agreement was a first step in reducing nitrogen discharge to waterways that are tributaries of the Chesapeake Bay. Under the agreement, the Bay states and the District of Columbia government committed to voluntarily reduce nitrogen loads by 40 percent from their 1985 levels. Blue Plains was the first plant in the region to achieve that goal. Furthermore, in every year since the full-scale implementation of the biological nitrogen removal (BNR) process was completed in 2000, Blue Plains has every year successfully achieved and exceeded that goal of a 40 percent reduction. In Fiscal Year 2009, the BNR process at Blue Plains reduced the nitrogen load by more than 58 percent. Installation of enhanced nutrient control systems was completed in 2014. The enhanced plant achieves nitrogen effluent levels at 4 mg/L.

=== Operational award ===
In 2010, DC Water received the "Platinum Peak Performance Award" from the National Association of Clean Water Agencies. This award is presented to member agencies for exceptional compliance for their National Pollutant Discharge Elimination System (NPDES) permit limits.

=== Sludge treatment ===
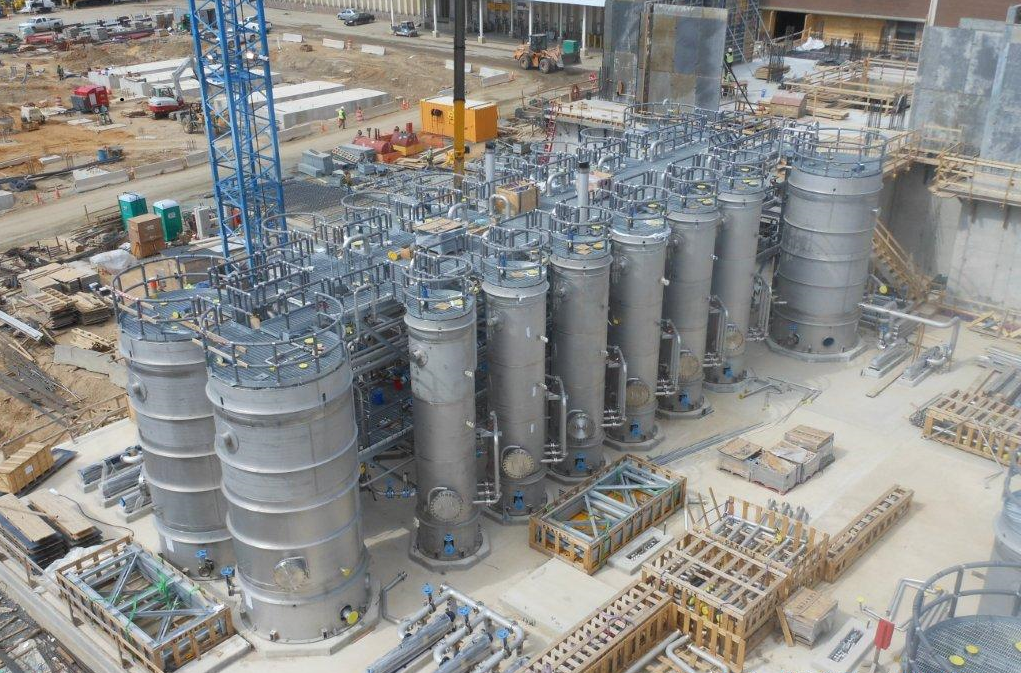
Sludge thermal hydrolysis reactors, utilizing the Cambi process, installed in 2013

DC Water began operating its thermal hydrolysis system, for improved treatment of sewage sludge, in 2015. This is the largest thermal hydrolysis facility in the world as of 2016. The system generates high quality sludge that is used as soil amendments (200,000 tons per year). A portion of the sludge is processed in an anaerobic digestion system which generates 10 MW of electricity that is used elsewhere at the treatment plant.

== History ==
The original Blue Plains facility opened in 1937 as a primary treatment facility. It discharged under 100 mgd, serving a population of 650,000. Population increases in the 1950s led to the construction of secondary treatment units in 1959, with an expanded discharge capacity of 240 mgd. In the 1970s a major expansion commenced that led to construction of advanced wastewater treatment components, and by 1983 the capacity was 300 mgd.

=== Service connections for Maryland suburbs ===
The Washington Suburban Sanitary Commission (WSSC) was established in Maryland in 1918 and operated sewer systems in portions of Montgomery and Prince George's Counties. The commission began to install sewer connections from its service area to the Blue Plains plant in the late 1930s and 1940s. WSSC had built its own sewage treatment plant in Bladensburg, Maryland in the 1940s. In the early 1950s WSSC reached agreement with the District of Columbia government to connect the Bladensburg area to Blue Plains, and the Bladensburg plant was closed.

=== Expanded service to Virginia communities ===
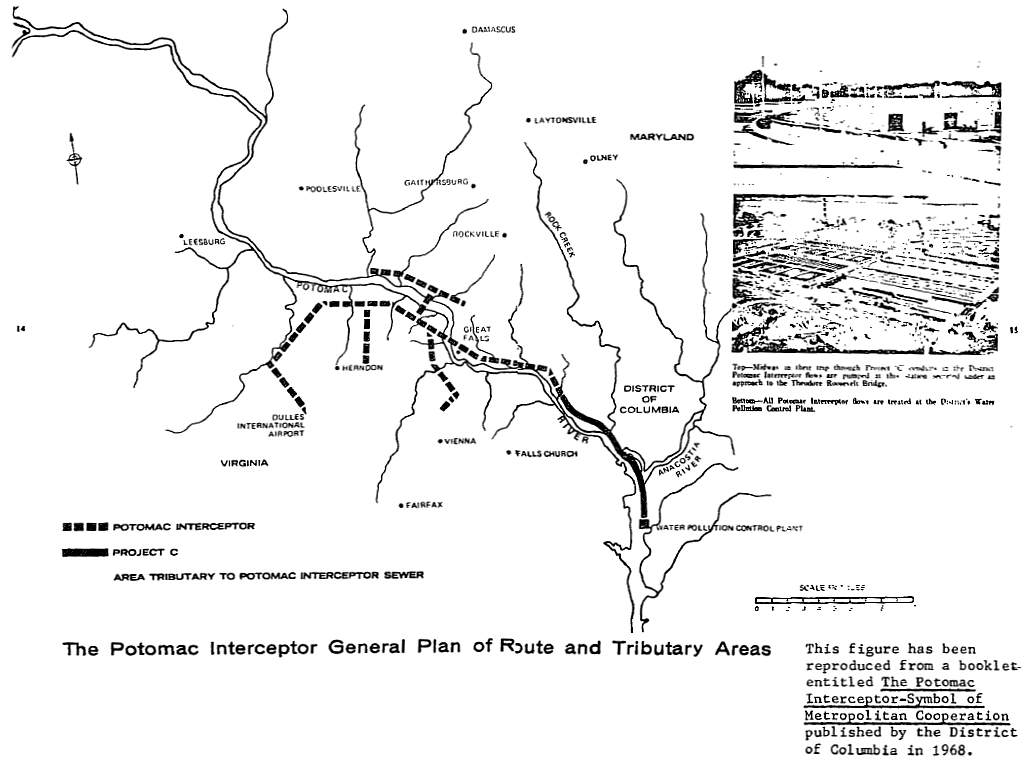
The Potomac Interceptor's general plan from 1968

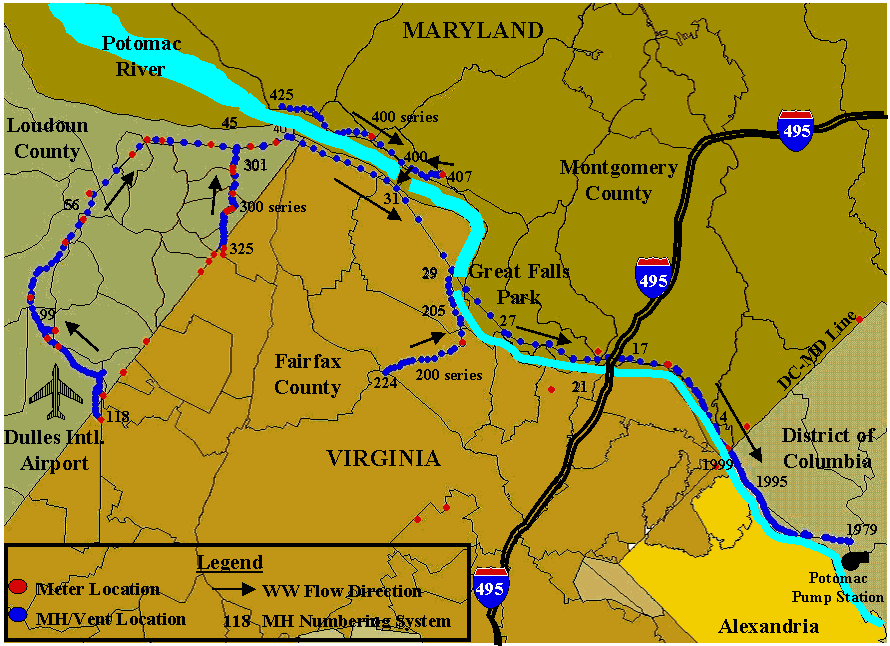
Map of the Potomac Interceptor from 2002

As the Virginia suburbs expanded in the 1950s-1960s, additional sewage treatment capacity was needed for that area. Planners in the Washington metropolitan area, led by the Metropolitan Washington Council of Governments, recommended that the areas around the new Dulles International Airport (which opened to the public in 1962) be served by the Blue Plains plant. This decision required the construction of a 43 miles (69 km) interceptor sewer from the Dulles area to Blue Plains. Congress authorized construction of the Potomac Interceptor (PI) in 1960. Construction of the main interceptor system took place in 1962. Subsequently there have been several pipe extension and maintenance projects. As of 2026, DC Water estimated that the Potomac Interceptor's daily flow of wastewater was approximately 60 million gallons. (Other areas in the northern Virginia suburbs are served by treatment plants operated by Arlington County, the City of Alexandria, Fairfax County, Prince William County and the Upper Occoquan Sewage Authority.)

On January 19, 2026, a section of the Potomac Interceptor collapsed in Montgomery County, causing a sewage spill in the Potomac River, estimated at 240 million to 300 million gallons. DC Water has been managing the PI repairs, and water quality monitoring in the river is being conducted by the Maryland Department of the Environment.
