= Thermal hydrolysis =

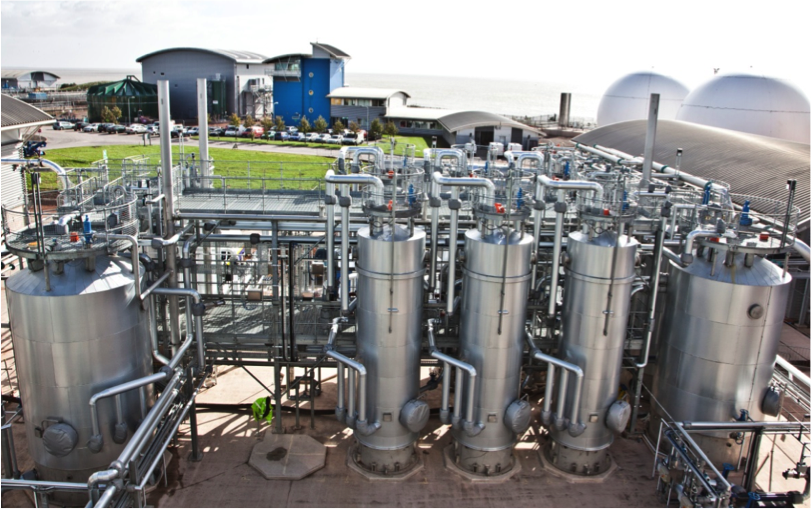
Thermal Hydrolysis Plant in Cardiff, Wales, UK

Thermal hydrolysis is a process used for treating industrial waste, municipal solid waste and sewage sludge by applying heat and rapid lowering of pressure. It is used to sterilize the waste stream and produce fertilizer, biogas, and other useful products. It was first deployed in 1996.

== Description ==
Thermal hydrolysis is a two-stage process combining high-pressure boiling of waste or sludge followed by a rapid decompression. This combined action sterilizes the sludge and makes it more biodegradable, which improves digestion performance. Sterilization destroys pathogens in the sludge resulting in it exceeding the stringent requirements for land application (agriculture).

In addition, the treatment adjusts the rheology to such an extent that loading rates to sludge anaerobic digesters can be doubled, and also dewaterability of the sludge is significantly improved. The first full-scale application of this process for sewage sludge was installed in Hamar, Norway in 1996. Since then, there have been over 30 additional installations globally.

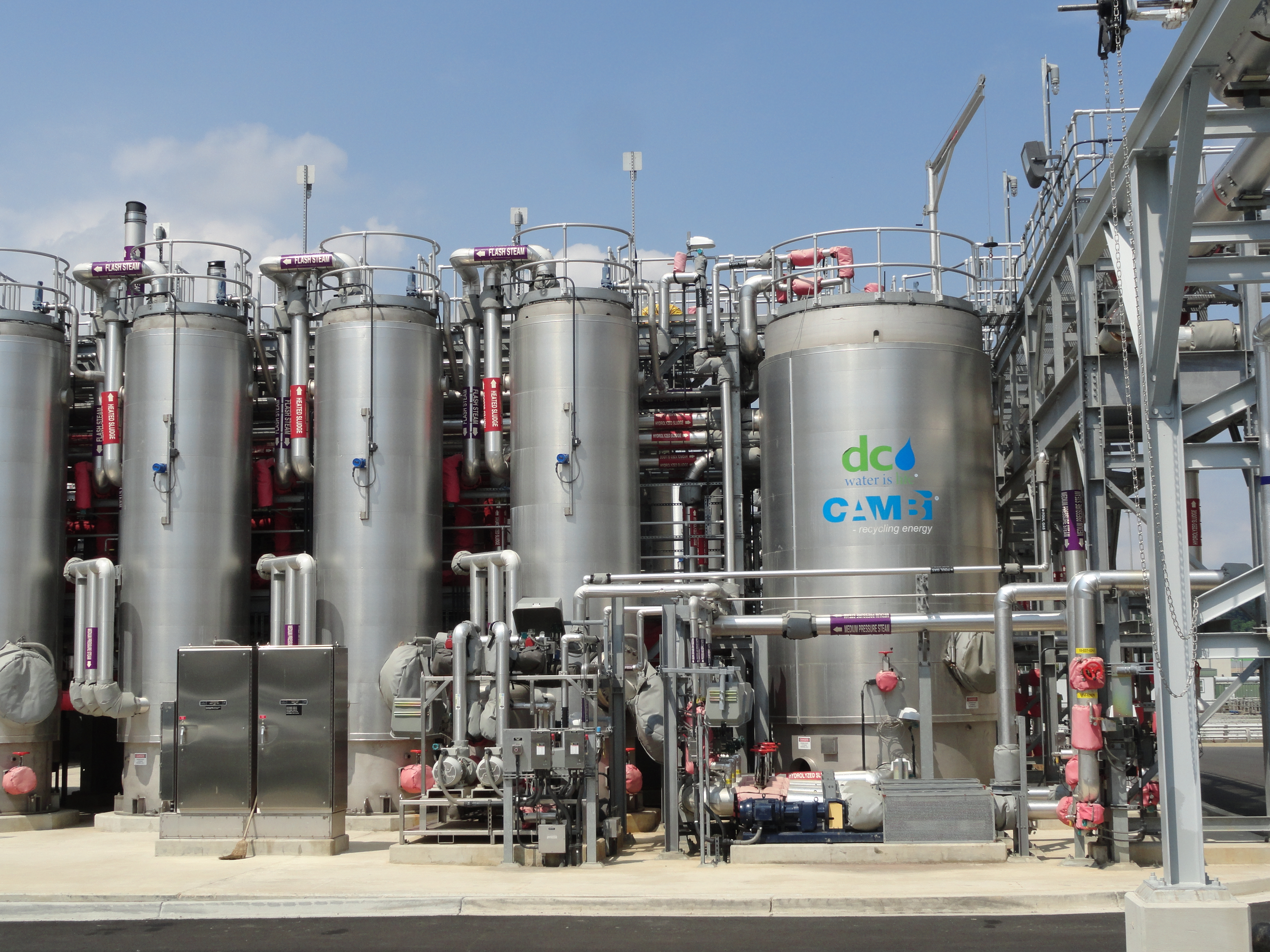
Thermal hydrolysis reactors at Blue Plains in 2016.

== Commercial application at a sewage treatment plant ==
Sewage treatment plants, such as Blue Plains in Washington, D.C., USA, have adopted thermal hydrolysis of sewage sludge in order to produce commercially valuable products (such as electricity and high quality biosolid fertilizers) out of the wastewater. The full-scale commercial application of thermal hydrolysis enables the plant to utilize the solids portion of the wastewater to make power and fine fertilizer directly from sewage waste.

== Municipal waste-to-fuel application ==
The city of Oslo, Norway installed a system for converting domestic food waste to fuel in 2012. A thermal hydrolysis system produces biogas from the food waste, which provides fuel for the city bus system and is also used for agricultural fertilizer.

== 30 largest thermal hydrolysis plants ==
Plant	Capacity (TDS/A)*	Commission Year	Thermal Hydrolysis Supplier
Blue Plains, Washington DC, USA	135,000	2014	Cambi
Gaoantun, Beijing, China	134,000	2017	Cambi
Gaobeidian, Beijing, China	99,100	2016	Cambi
Minworth, Birmingham, UK	91,250	2018	Cambi
Davyhulme, Manchester, UK	91,000	2013	Cambi
Huaifang, Beijing, China	89,100	2017	Cambi
Xiaohongmen, Beijing, China	65,700	2016	Cambi
Qinghe II, Beijing, China	59,500	2017	Cambi
Crossness, London, UK	58,500	2018	Cambi
Ringsend, Dublin, Ireland	56,000	2002	Cambi
Howdon, Newcastle Upon Tyne, UK	40,000	2010	Cambi
Riverside, London, UK	40,000	2009	Cambi
Tees Valley, UK	37,000	2008	Cambi
Seafield, Edinburgh UK	36,500	2015	Cambi
Beckton, London, UK	36,500	2013	Cambi
Cardiff, UK	30,000	2009	Cambi
Tilburg, Netherlands	29,000	2014	Cambi
Esholt, Yorkshire, UK	26,400	2013	Veolia
Santiago, Chile	25,000	2010	Cambi
Oxford, UK	24,400	2010	Veolia
Vilnius, Lithuania	23,000	2010	Cambi
Whitlingham, Norwich, UK	23,000	2008	Cambi
Vigo, Spain	22,000	2014	Cambi
Afan, UK	20,000	2009	Cambi
Bruxelles Nord, Belgium	20,000	2007	Cambi
Cotton Valley, Milton Keynes, UK	20,000	2007	Cambi
NOSES, Aberdeen, UK	16,500	2001	Cambi
Lille, France	16,400	2013	Veolia
EGE Waste Treatment, Oslo, Norway	15,000	2012	Cambi
Turku, Finland	14,000	2009	Cambi
Apeldoorn, Netherlands	13,000	2015	Sustec
Oxley Creek, Brisbane, Australia	12,900	2006	Cambi

* Tons of Dry Solids/Year

== See also ==
- List of waste-water treatment technologies
