= Washington Suburban Sanitary Commission =

Political subdivision of Maryland

WSSC Water (Washington Suburban Sanitary Commission)
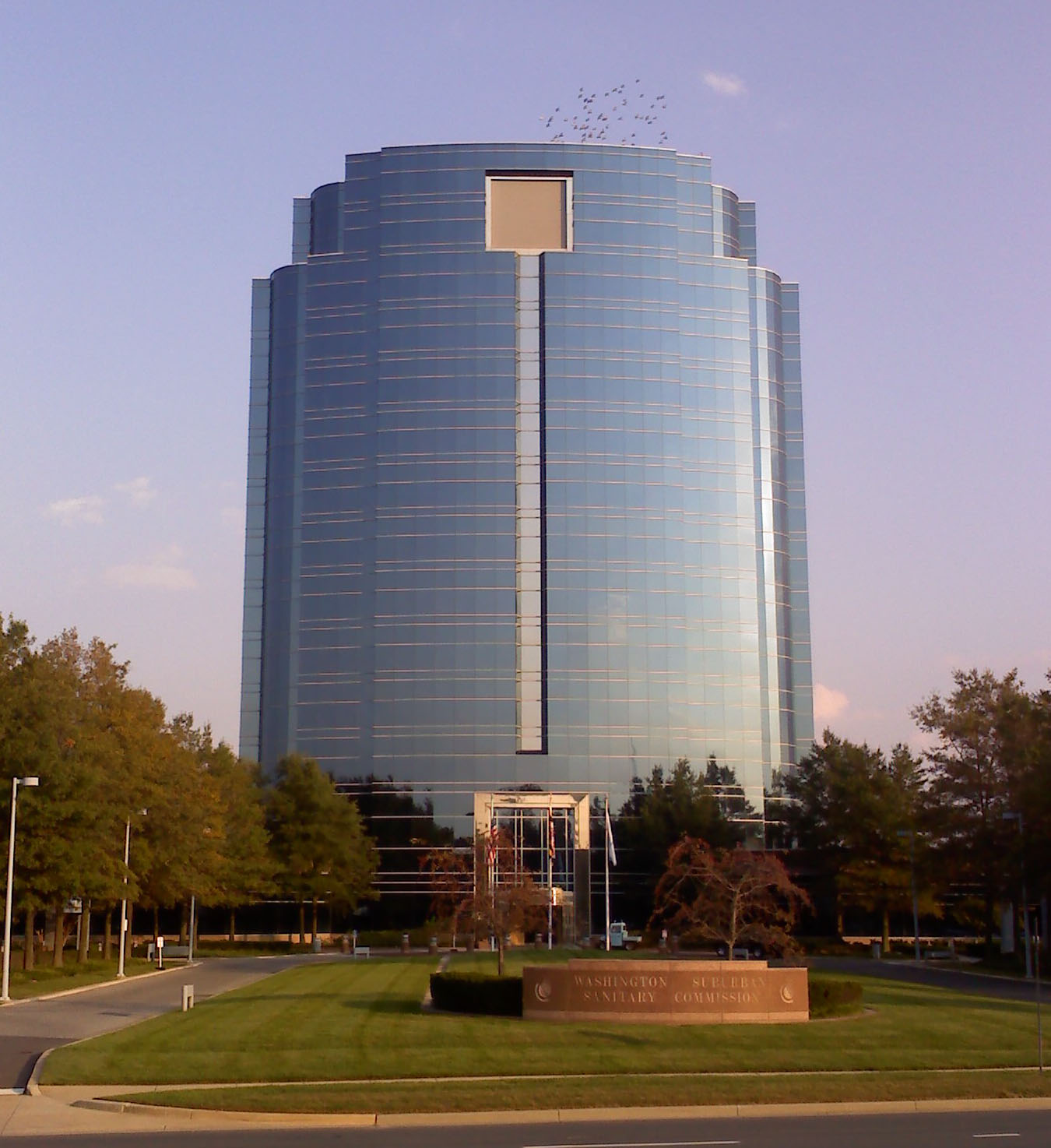
- Headquarters
- Abbreviation: WSSC Water
- Formation: May 1, 1918; 108 years ago
- Legal status: Political subdivision of the State of Maryland
- Headquarters: 14501 Sweitzer Lane, Laurel, Maryland, U.S. 20707
- Coordinates: 39.088736°N 76.896673°W
- Services: Montgomery county, Prince George's county, and part of Howard county, Maryland
- Commissioners: Regina Y. Speed-Bost (Chair), T. Eloise Foster (Vice Chair), Fausto R. Bayonet, Howard A Denis, Lynnette D. Espy-Williams, Mark J. Smith
- General Manager: Kishia L. Powell
- Website: www.wsscwater.com

The Washington Suburban Sanitary Commission (WSSC Water) is a bi-county political subdivision of the State of Maryland that provides safe drinking water and wastewater treatment for Montgomery and Prince George's Counties in Maryland except for a few cities in both counties that continue to operate their own water facilities.

The Commission is one of the largest water and wastewater utilities in the United States. WSSC Water serves about 1.9 million people in an approximately 1,000-square-mile (2,600 km^{2}) area. It owns and manages over 11,000 miles (18,000 km) of water and sewer mains.

== Operations ==
A bi-county agency, WSSC Water has extensive regulatory functions. It promulgates and enforces the plumbing code for its jurisdiction as well as reviews and approves contract plans for extensions of water and sewer mains. The agency operates 3 reservoirs (plus shared access to a fourth reservoir), 2 drinking water filtration plants, and 6 water resource recovery facilities. It also collects wastewater which is treated at the Blue Plains Advanced Wastewater Treatment Plant (operated by DC Water) in Washington, D.C.

== Facilities ==
=== Reservoirs ===
- T. Howard Duckett Reservoir
- Triadelphia Reservoir
- Little Seneca Lake (Note: Shared resource with Fairfax County Water Authority and Washington Aqueduct. Jennings Randolph Lake, operated by the U.S. Army Corps of Engineers, is also shared by these water suppliers.)

=== Drinking water filtration plants ===
- Patuxent
- Potomac
- Robert Morse (in operation 1936–1962)

=== Water Resource Recovery Facilities ===
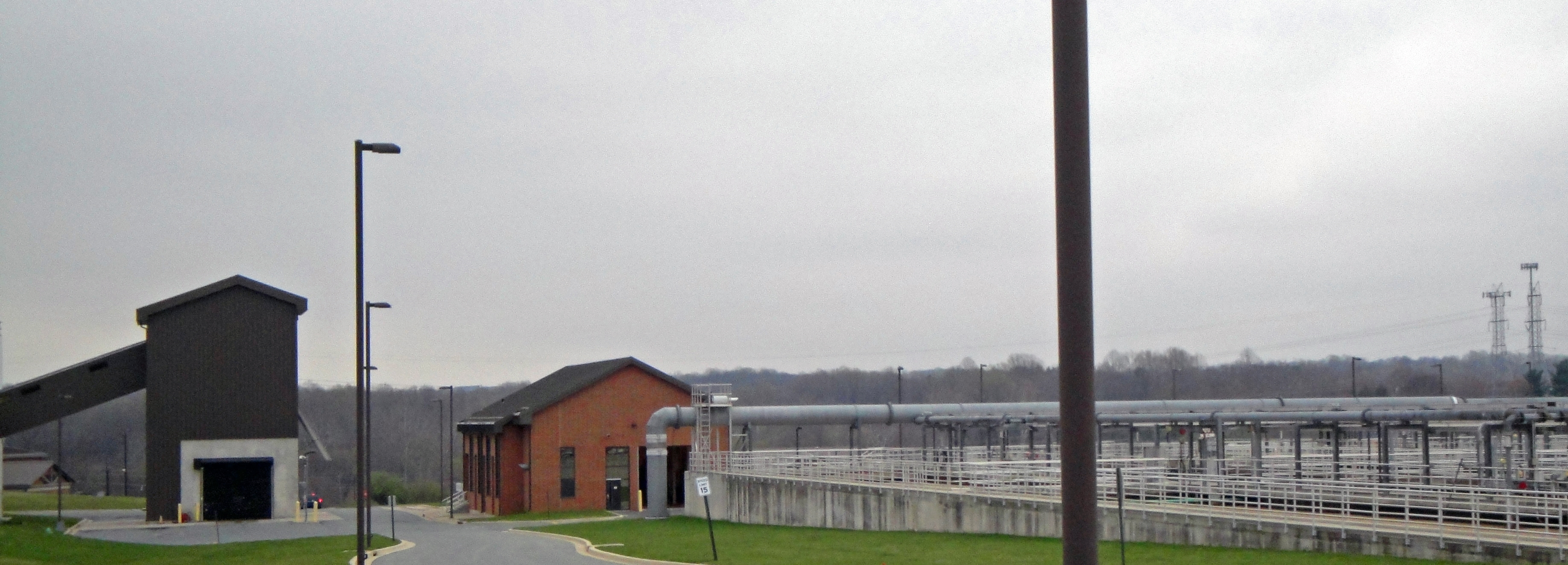
Seneca Wastewater Treatment Plant in 2011

Plant	Location	Size (Note: Design flow (maximum) in mgd: million gallons per day)	Discharges to
Damascus WRRF	Damascus	1.50 mgd	Magruder Branch
Hyattstown WRRF	Hyattstown	0.015 mgd	Little Bennett Creek
Parkway WRRF	Laurel	7.50 mgd	Patuxent River
Piscataway WRRF	Accokeek	30.00 mgd	Piscataway Creek
Seneca WRRF	Germantown	26.00 mgd	Great Seneca Creek
Western Branch WRRF	Upper Marlboro	30.00 mgd	Western Branch
Blue Plains (DC Water and Sewer Authority)	Washington, D.C.	169.90 mgd (Note: WSSC Water allocation is 169.90 mgd. Total plant capacity is 370.00 mgd.)	Potomac River

== Management ==
WSSC Water is overseen by six commissioners, three from Montgomery County and three from Prince George's County. These commissioners are appointed by their respective county executives with the approval of the county councils. The day-to-day operations are the responsibility of a general manager/chief executive officer, who supervises a staff of over 1,700. The agency's headquarters office is located in Laurel, Maryland. The proposed operating budget for fiscal year 2027 is $1.2 billion, and the proposed capital budget is $770.2 million.

== History ==
In 1911, Asa Phillips, sanitary engineer for the District of Columbia, convened a meeting with local residents to discuss the problem of Montgomery and Prince George's counties polluting the streams that flowed into the District. The pollution of the streams was a major health concern for the residents of the District of Columbia. The people at the meeting advised the Maryland General Assembly that a study of the problem was needed. The Assembly passed a bill authorizing the Governor of Maryland to appoint a study commission in 1912.

As a result of the recommendation of the study commission, Maryland Delegate Paul Waters introduced a bill to establish the Washington Suburban Sanitary Commission, and the General Assembly passed the bill on April 8, 1916. WSSC Water was originally created to study the drainage situation in Montgomery and Prince George's counties and to recommend the best possible sewage system.

In 1918, the Commission released its report, written by Robert B. Morse and Harry Hall, to the General Assembly. The report recommended establishing a permanent Washington Suburban Sanitary Commission as a bi-county agency for water and sewage. The report included a plan for construction for the next 22 years. T. Howard Duckett drafted a law officially establishing WSSC Water as a permanent bi-county agency. Following lobbying by E. Brooke Lee, the law was passed, effective May 1, 1918. William T.S. Curtis of Montgomery County, Emory H. Bogley of Montgomery County, and Duckett of Prince George's County were named commissioners.

Duckett visited Elizabeth, New Jersey, which had financed its sewage plan by having a front-foot benefit charge and a land tax, with the house connections installed at the cost of each property owner. WSSC Water requested a similar arrangement in Maryland, and the county governments certified the levy in March 1919, using the rate of $0.015 per $100 of assessed property.

=== Drinking water facilities ===
In 1919 WSSC Water purchased the Takoma Park water system, which drew water from Sligo Creek. To provide additional capacity, the commission bought a used water filtration plant from Culpeper, Virginia, and installed the system along the Northwest Branch near Burnt Mills. This facility was replaced with a new system, the Robert B. Morse Water Filtration Plant, in the 1930s. Later, a pipeline was built to bring water from the Patuxent River at Mink Hollow to the filtration plant in Burnt Mills. Triadelphia Reservoir was built on the Patuxent and opened in 1943.

In 1944, the Patuxent River Filtration Plant was built near Laurel. The T. Howard Duckett Dam and Reservoir was completed in 1952, adding more capacity. The 2023 average delivery level for the Patuxent plant is 110 mgd. The Potomac River drinking water plant opened in 1961, with an initial capacity of 30 mgd. The 2023 average delivery level is 280 mgd.

=== Sewage treatment facilities ===
WSSC Water connected its trunk sewers near Washington, D.C., into the Blue Plains system beginning in the 1930s, as the treatment plant began operation. The commission built its first sewage treatment plant in Bladensburg in the 1940s; in the 1950s this plant was closed as additional connections were made to the Blue Plains system. Most of the WSSC sewers in Montgomery County are now served by the Blue Plains plant, except for the northern portion of the county, which is served by the Seneca plant, which opened in the 1970s. In Prince George's County, the Parkway plant was built in the 1950s, followed by the Piscataway and Western Branch plants in the 1960s.

== See also ==
- Washington Suburban Sanitary Commission Police Department
