= List of United States water companies =

This is a list of water companies in the United States. For more information see water supply and sanitation in the United States.

== Alabama ==
- Asbury Water Authority
- Autauga County Water Authority
- Autaugaville Water Authority
- Bakerhill Water Authority
- Bear Creek Water Works Board
- Beauregard Water Authority
- Bellwood Water And Fire Protection Authority
- Big Wills Water Authority
- Blount County Water Authority
- Boldo Water And Fire Protection Authority
- Buhl Elrod And Holman Water Authority
- Butler County Water Authority
- Calhoun County Water And Fire Protection Authority
- Canoe Water And Fire Protection Authority
- Carrolls Creek Water Authority
- Central Elmore County Water Authority
- Central Talladega County Water District
- Chandler Mountain-Greasy Cove Water Authority
- Chattahoochee Valley Water Supply District
- Cherokee County Water Authority
- Chilton Water Authority
- Chisholm Heights Water And Fire Protection Authority
- Choctaw Edna Water Authority
- Clarke Wilcox Monroe Water Authority
- Clay County Water Authority
- Cleburne County Water Authority
- Coaling Water Authority
- Coffee County Water Authority
- Coker Water Authority Inc
- Cook Springs Water Authority Inc
- Coosa Valley Water Supply District
- Covington County Water Authority
- Cowikee Water Authority
- Cumberland Mountain Water And Fire Protection Authority
- Curry Water Authority
- Dale County Water Authority
- Deer Park Vinegar Bend Water And Fire Protection Authority
- Dekalb Jackson Water Supply District
- Douglas Water And Fire Protection Authority
- East Lauderdale County Water And Fire Protection Authority
- Edwardsville Water And Fire Protection Authority
- Elmore Water Authority
- Fayette County Water Authority
- Fayetteville Water And Fire Protection Authority
- Five Star Water Supply District
- Fosters Ralph Water Authority
- Franklin County Water Service Authority
- Frankville Water And Fire Protection Authority
- Greenhill Water And Fire Protection Authority
- Hackneyville Water Authority
- Hale County Water Authority
- Hamden Ridge Water Authority
- Harrisburg Water Authority
- Harvest-Monrovia Water Authority
- Henry County Water Authority Inc
- Highland Water Authority
- Hollins Water Authority
- Houston County Water Authority
- Huguley Water Authority
- Huntsville Utilities
- Huxford Water And Fire Protection Authority
- Ida Station Water District
- Jackson's Gap Water Authority
- Joppa Hulaco And Ryan Water Authority
- Kushla Water District
- Lagrange Mountain Water Authority
- Lamar County Water And Fire Protection Authority
- Leroy Water Authority
- Limestone County Water And Sewer Authority
- Little Waxie Water Authority
- Loachapoka Water Authority
- Lowndes County Water Authority
- Lowndesboro Water Authority
- Lyeffion Water And Fire Protection Authority
- Macon County Water And Fire Protection Authority
- MCB Water And Fire Protection Authority
- Mcintosh Water And Fire Protection Authority
- Mid Central Water And Fire Protection Authority
- Millers Ferry Water Authority
- Millerville Water And Fire Protection Authority
- Montgomery Water Works and Sanitary Sewer Board
- Moulton Water Authority
- Mount Andrew Water Authority
- Mount Pleasant Battens Water Authority
- Munford Water And Fire Protection Authority
- New London Water Sewer And Fire Protection Authority
- North Baldwin Water Authority
- North Choctaw Water And Sewer Authority
- North Clarke Water Authority
- North Dallas Water Authority
- North Geneva County Water Authority
- North Jackson County Water Authority
- Northeast Alabama Water Authority
- Northeast Morgan County Water Authority
- Old Line Water Authority
- Old Suggsville Water And Fire Protection Authority
- Orange Beach Water Sewer And Fire Protection Authority
- Owassa And Brownville Waterworks And Fire Protection Authority
- Owens Cross Roads Water Authority
- Park City Water Authority
- Perdido Bay Water Sewer And Fire Protection Authority
- Perdido Water Service Authority
- Perry County Water Authority
- Peterson Water Authority
- Pickens County Water Authority
- Pike County Water Authority
- Pilgrim-Providence Water And Fire Protection Authority
- Pine Bluff Water Authority
- Pine Level Water Authority
- Pintlala Water And Fire Protection Authority
- Providence Water Authority
- Quint-Mar Water Authority
- Ray Water Authority
- Remlap-Pine Mountain Water And Fire Protection Authority
- Ridgeroad Water Authority
- Rockwood Water Authority
- Russell County Water Authority
- Saint Elmo Irvington Water Authority
- Sand Mountain Water Authority
- Sand Springs Water Authority
- Sellers Station Water And Fire Protection Authority
- Smiths Water And Sewer Authority
- Snowdoun Water And Fire Protection Authority
- South Bullock County Water Authority
- South Crenshaw Water Authority
- South Dallas Water Authority
- South Marengo County Water And Fire Protection Authority
- Southwest Alabama Water And Fire Protection Authority
- Spring Valley Water Authority
- Star-Mindingall Water Authority
- Stewartville Water Authority
- Sumter County Water Authority
- Tibbie Water And Fire Protection Authority
- Tillison Bend Water Authority
- Townley Water Authority
- Turnerville Water And Fire Protection Authority
- Twin Water Authority
- Upper Bear Creek Water Authority
- Wall Street Water Authority
- Walnut Hill Water Authority
- Walter Water Authority
- Warrior River Water Authority
- Washington County Water Authority
- Wattsville Water Authority
- West Autauga Water Authority
- West Barbour County Water And Fire Protection Authority
- West Clark Water Authority
- West Dallas County Water And Fire Protection Authority
- West Etowah County Water Authority
- West Lauderdale County Water And Fire Protection Authority
- West Morgan-East Lawrence Water And Sewer Authority
- Whorton Bend Water Authority
- Wolf Creek Water Sewer And Fire Protection Authority

== Arizona ==
- Arizona Water Company
- Global Water Resources
- Mohave County Water Authority
- Phoenix Water Services Department
- Pinal County Water Augmentation Authority
- Queen Creek Irrigation Water Delivery District 32
- Silverbell Irrigation District
- Thunderbird Water Delivery District 1
- Tucson Water

== Arkansas ==
- Central Arkansas Water
- Little Rock Water Reclamation Authority

== California ==
- California American Water
- California Department of Water Resources
- California Water Service
- Castaic Water Agency
- Del Oro Water Company
- East Bay Municipal Utility District
- Escondido Utilities
- Fallbrook Public Utility District
- Fresno Irrigation District
- Kern Water Bank Authority
- Kings River Conservation District
- JG Boswell Company Water Department
- Long Beach Water Department
- Los Angeles Department of Water and Power
- Marin Water
- Mesa Water District
- Metropolitan Water District of Southern California
- Municipal Water District of Orange County
- Oceanside Water Utilities
- Orange County Water District
- Orange Cove Irrigation District
- Otay Water District
- Padre Dam Municipal Water District
- Panoche Water District
- San Diego County Water Authority
- San Diego Water Department
- San Francisco Public Utilities Commission
- SJW Group
- San Luis and Delta-Mendota Water Authority
- Santa Clara Valley Water District
- Santa Margarita Water District
- Semitropic Water Storage District
- Solano Irrigiation District
- South Mesa Water Company
- South Montebello Irrigation District
- Southwest Water company
- Sunnyslope Water company
- Tulare Lake Basin Water Storage District
- Tulare Lake Drainage District
- Turlock Irrigation District
- Vallecitos Water District
- Valley Center Municipal Water District
- Vista Irrigation District
- Walnut Valley Water District
- Western Heights Water Company
- Westlands Water District

== Colorado ==
- Academy Water & Sanitation District
- Alpensee Water District
- Arapahoe Estates Water District
- Aurora Water
- Baca Grande Water & Sanitation District
- Bailey Water & Sanitation District
- Bancroft-Clover Water and Sanitation District
- Baseline Water District
- Bear Creek Water and Sanitation District
- Bennett Bear Creek Farms Water & Sanitation District
- Berkeley Water & Sanitation District
- Beulah Water Works District
- Blue Mountain Water District
- Bone Mesa Domestic Water District
- Bonvue Water & Sanitation District
- Bow Mar Water & Sanitation District
- Box Elder Water and Sanitation District
- Brook Forest Water District
- Brownsville Water and Sanitation District
- Buffalo Creek Water District
- Byers Water & Sanitation District
- Castleton Center Water and Sanitation District
- Castlewood Water and Sanitation District
- Centennial Water & Sanitation District
- Central Adams County Water & Sanitation District
- Central Weld County Water District
- Chatfield South Water District
- Cherry Creek Valley Water and Sanitation District
- Cherry Creek Village Water District
- Cherry Hills Heights Water & Sanitation District
- Chipeta Water District
- City of Fountain's Water Department
- Clear Creek Valley Water & Sanitation District
- Clifton Water District
- Colorado Springs Utilities
- Columbine Lake Water District
- Columbine Water and Sanitation District
- Cottonwood Water and Sanitation District
- Crestview Water and Sanitation District
- Crow Hill Water and Sanitation District
- Cucharas Sanitation & Water District
- Deer Creek Water District
- Denver Southeast Suburban Water & Sanitation District
- Diamond Ridge Water & Sanitation District
- Dominion Water & Sanitation District
- Donala Water and Sanitation District
- Eagle River Water & Sanitation District
- East Alamosa Water and Sanitation District
- East Boulder County Water District
- East Cherry Creek Valley Water & Sanitation District
- East Dillon Water District
- East Larimer County Water District
- Florissant Water & Sanitation District
- Forest View Acres Water District
- Fort Collins-Loveland Water District
- Garden Valley Water and Sanitation District
- Genesee Water & Sanitation District
- Granby Silver Creek Water and Wastewater Authority
- Grand County Water and Sanitation District No. 1
- Green Mountain Water and Sanitation District
- Greenwood Plaza Water District
- Havana Water and Sanitation District
- Hazeltine Heights Water and Sanitation District
- Heeney Water District
- High View Water District
- Highland Lakes Water District
- Hi-Line Water and Sanitation District
- Hillcrest Water and Sanitation District
- Himalaya Water and Sanitation District
- Holly Hills Water and Sanitation District
- Hoover Hill Water & Sanitation District
- Idledale Water and Sanitation District
- Indian Hills Water District
- Inverness Water and Sanitation District
- Ken Caryl West Ranch Water District
- Ken-Caryl Ranch Water & Sanitation District
- Kittredge Sanitation and Water District
- Lakehurst Water & Sanitation District
- Lakeview Estates Water District
- Left Hand Water District
- Little Thompson Water District
- Longs Peak Water District
- Lookout Mountain Water District
- Mansfield Heights Water & Sanitation District
- Meadowbrook Water District
- Mesa Cortina Water and Sanitation District
- Mesa Water & Sanitation District
- Miller Ranch Water & Sanitation District
- Montezuma County Water District#1
- Morgan County Quality Water District
- Morrison Creek Metropolitan Water & Sanitation District
- Mountain View Villages Water and Sanitation District
- Mountain Water and Sanitation District
- Mt Crested Butte Water & Sanitation District
- Mt. Werner Water and Sanitation District
- Navajo Western Water District
- North Carter Lake Water District
- North Lincoln Water and Sanitation District
- North Pecos Water & Sanitation District
- North Shore Water District
- North Table Mountain Water and Sanitation District
- North Weld County Water District
- Northern Colorado Water Conservancy District
- Northern Douglas County Water and Sanitation District
- Northgate Water District
- Olde Stage Water District
- Pagosa Area Water and Sanitation District
- Park Center Water District
- Park Forest Water District
- Parker Water and Sanitation District
- Parkville Water District
- Penrose Water District
- Pinewood Springs Water District
- Pioneer Lookout Water District
- Platte Canyon Water and Sanitation District
- Pleasant View Water and Sanitation District
- Rainbow Valley Water District
- Ralston Valley Water and Sanitation District
- Red Hawk Ranch Water & Sanitation District
- Redstone Water and Sanitation District
- Resource Colorado Water and Sanitation MD
- Ridgewood Water District
- Roaring Fork Water & Sanitation District
- Rock Creek Mesa Water District
- Round Mountain Water and Sanitation District
- Roxborough Water and Sanitation District
- Rural Water Authority of Douglas County
- Security Water District
- Sedalia Water and Sanitation District
- Shannon Water and Sanitation District
- Silver Heights Water & Sanitation
- SilverCreek Water & Sanitation District
- Snake River Water District
- Snowmass Water & Sanitation District
- Somerset Domestic Waterworks District
- South Adams County Water & Sanitation District
- South Evergreen Water District
- South Fork Water and Sanitation District
- South Sheridan Water, Sanitary Sewer & Storm Drain
- South-East Englewood Water District
- Southwest Metropolitan Water and Sanitation District
- Southwest Suburban Denver Water and Sanitation District
- Spring Canyon Water & Sanitation District
- St. Mary's Glacier Water and Sanitation District
- Steamboat Lake Water and Sanitation District
- Strasburg Sanitation and Water District
- Stratmoor Hills Water District
- Tabernash Meadows Water & Sanitation District
- Teller County Water & Sanitation District#1
- Timber Creek Water District
- Timbers Water and Sanitation District
- Tri-County Water Conservancy District
- Turkey Canon Ranch Water District
- United Water & Sanitation District
- Upper Bear Creek Water and Sanitation District
- Upper Big Sandy Ground Water Management District
- Valley at Winter Park Water District
- Valley Water District
- West Fort Collins Water District
- Westcreek Lake Water District
- Westwood Lakes Water District
- Wheat Ridge Water District
- Widefield Water and Sanitation District
- Willowbrook Water & Sanitation District
- Willows Water District
- Winter Park Ranch Water and Sanitation District
- Winter Park Water & Sanitation District
- Woodmoor Water and Sanitation District No. 1

== Connecticut ==
- Metropolitan District Commission (Hartford area)
- Regional Water Authority (New Haven area)
- Aquarion Water Company (Fairfield, New Haven, Hartford, Litchfield, Middlesex and New London Counties)

== Delaware ==
- Artesian Water Company
- Lewes Board of Public Works
- Middlesex Water Company
- Municipal Services Commission of the City of New Castle
- Wilmington Department of Public Works
- Veolia Water Company

== District of Columbia ==
- D.C. Water and Sewer Authority (DCWASA)
- Washington Aqueduct (wholesale)

== Florida ==
- Aqua America - Florida
- Gainesville Regional Utilities
- Hialeah Department of Water and Sewers
- JEA (formerly Jacksonville Electric Authority)
- Miami-Dade Water and Sewer Department
- Miami-Petersburg Department of Water and Sewers
- Orlando Utilities Commission
- St. Petersburg Water Resources Department
- Tampa Bay Water

== Georgia ==
- City of Atlanta Department of Watershed Management
- Cherokee County Water & Sewerage Authority
- City of Austell Water System
- City of Canton Water System
- City of Mountain Park Water System
- City of Powder Springs Water System
- City of Smyrna Water System
- City of Woodstock Water System
- Cobb County - Marietta Water Authority
- Cobb County Water System
- Columbus Water Works
- Douglasville/Douglas County Water Authority
- Etowah Water and Sewer Authority
- Gwinnett County Department of Water Resources
- Gilmer County Water Authority
- Heard County Water Authority
- Henry County Water Authority
- Jackson County Water and Sewerage Authority
- Macon Water Authority
- Marietta Board of Lights and Water
- Paulding County Water System
- Pickens County Water Authority
- Upper Oconee Basin Water Authority
- Waleska Water Authority

== Hawaii ==
- Hawaii American Water

== Illinois ==
- Aqua America - Illinois
- Aurora Department of Public Works
- Axton Environmental
- Chicago Department of Water Management
- Illinois American Water
- Rockford Department of Public Works

== Indiana ==
- Aqua America - Indiana
- Indiana American Water
- Indianapolis Water

== Iowa ==
- Des Moines Water Works
- Iowa American Water

== Kansas ==
- Kansas City Board of Public Utilities
- WaterOne

== Kentucky ==
- Kentucky American Water
- Louisville Water Company
- Owensboro Municipal Utilities
- Martin County Water District
- Prestonsburg City Utilities
- Paintsville City Utilities
- Louisa City Water
- Southern Water District
- Salyersville Water Works
- Mountain Water District
- Frankfort Plant Board
- Big Sandy Water District
- Rattlesnake Ridge Water District
- City of Ashland Water Department

== Louisiana ==
- Baton Rouge Water Company
- Calcasieu Water Works District 1
- City of Bogalusa
- City of Monroe
- Jefferson Parish Water Department
- Sewerage and Water Board of New Orleans
- Shreveport Office of Water and Sewerage

== Maine ==
- Aqua America - Maine
- Maine Water - Owned by Connecticut Water
- Portland Water District (Greater Portland area)

== Maryland ==
- Anne Arundel County Department of Public Works
- Baltimore Bureau of Water and Wastewater (serves City of Baltimore and Baltimore County)
- Easton Utilities
- Maryland American Water
- Washington Suburban Sanitary Commission (Montgomery County and Prince George's County)

== Massachusetts ==
- Boston Water and Sewer Commission
- Cambridge Water Department
- Holyoke Water Works
- KWI North America
- Lynn Water and Sewer Commission
- Massachusetts Water Resources Authority (wholesale)

== Michigan ==
- Detroit Water and Sewerage Department
- Grand Rapids Water System
- Great Lakes Water Authority
- Holland Board of Public Works
- Lansing Board of Water and Light
- Michigan American Water
- Saginaw-Midland Municipal Water Supply Corporation

== Minnesota ==
- Minneapolis Water Department
- Saint Paul Regional Water Services

== Mississippi ==
- Jackson Department of Public Works

== Missouri ==
- Aqua America - Missouri
- City Utilities of Springfield
- Missouri American Water
- St. Louis Water Division

== Nebraska ==
- Metropolitan Utilities District (Omaha Metro Area)

== New Hampshire ==
- Pennichuck Corporation (central and southern NH)

== New Jersey ==
- Aqua America - New Jersey
- Atlantic City Municipal Utilities Authority
- Brick Township Municipal Utilities Authority
- East Windsor Municipal Utilities Authority
- Freehold Township Water And Sewer
- Middlesex Water Company
- New Jersey American Water
- Newark Department of Water and Sewer Utilities
- Ocean County Municipal Utilities Authority
- Passaic Valley Water Commission
- Trenton Water Works
- United Water

== New York ==
- American Water (Long Island)
- Aqua America - New York
- Buffalo Water Authority
- Lakewood Township Municipal Utilities Authority
- New York City Department of Environmental Protection
- Rochester Bureau of Water and Lighting
- Syracuse Water Department
- Yonkers Department of Public Works

== North Carolina ==
- Aqua America - North Carolina
- Cape Fear Public Utility Authority (Wilmington-New Hanover County)
- Charlotte Water
- Durham Public Works Department
- Greensboro Water Resources Department
- Orange Water and Sewer Authority (OWASA)
- Raleigh Public Utilities Department
- Winston-Salem/Forsyth County Utilities Division

== Ohio ==
- Akron Public Utilities Bureau
- Aqua America - Ohio
- Cleveland Division of Water
- Columbus Department of Public Utilities
- Del-Co Water Company
- Greater Cincinnati Water Works
- Ohio American Water
- Toledo Department of Public Utilities

== Oklahoma ==
- Oklahoma City Department of Utilities

== Oregon ==
- Portland Water Bureau

== Pennsylvania ==
- Aqua Pennsylvania
- Borough of Kutztown Water Department
- Borough of Quakertown Water Department
- Borough of Schuylkill Haven Utilities Department
- Chester Water Authority
- City of Bethlehem Department of Water & Sewer Resources
- Downingtown Municipal Water Authority
- Doylestown Borough Water Department
- Ephrata Area Joint Authority
- Erie Water Works
- Horsham Water and Sewer Authority
- North Penn Water Authority
- North Wales Water Authority
- Pennsylvania American Water
- Philadelphia Water Department
- Pittsburgh Water and Sewer Authority
- South Middleton Municipal Authority
- Veolia Water Company
- Warminster Municipal Authority

== South Carolina ==
- Aqua America - South Carolina
- Beaufort-Jasper Water and Sewer Authority (BJWSA)
- Charleston Water System
- Dorchester County Water Authority (DCWA)
- Dorchester County Water and Sewer (DCWS)
- Mount Pleasant Waterworks (MPW)
- City of Columbia Water
- Greenville Water
- Spartanburg Water
- Summerville Commissioners of Public Works (SCPW)

== Tennessee ==
- Tennessee American Water

== Texas ==
- Aqua America - Texas
- Austin Water
- Clear Lake City Water Authority
- Corpus Christi Water Department
- Dallas Water Utilities
- El Paso Water Utilities
- Fort Worth Water Department
- Greater Texoma Utility Authority
- Houston Water
- North Texas Municipal Water District
- San Antonio Water System
- Tarrant Regional Water District
- Texas American Water
- The Trinity River Authority of Texas

== Utah ==
- Salt Lake City Department of Public Utilities
- Washington County Water Conservancy District

== Vermont ==
- Burlington Department of Public Works

== Virginia ==
- Aqua America - Virginia
- City of Fairfax Utilities [Fairfax City]
- City of Falls Church Department of Public Works (serves Falls Church and east-central Fairfax County)
- City of Manassas Utilities (also wholesale)
- Fairfax County Water Authority (most of Fairfax County, major wholesaler to surrounding areas)
- Loudoun Water (formerly Loudoun County Sanitation Authority), serves the unincorporated areas of Loudoun County
- Prince William County Service Authority (most of Prince William County except Dale City)
- Town of Leesburg Water
- Town of Purcellville Water
- Virginia American Water Company (Alexandria, Dale City, Hopewell, Cape Charles)

== Washington ==
- Cascade Water Alliance
- Seattle Public Utilities
- Snohomish County Public Utility District (PUD)
- Tacoma Water division of Tacoma Public Utilities
- West Slope Water District

== West Virginia ==
- West Virginia American Water
- Kermit Water Works
- Fort Gay Water Works
- Logan Water Works
- Gilbert Water Department
- New Creek Water Association
- Keyser Water Department

== Wisconsin ==
- Madison Water Utility
- Milwaukee Water Works

== See also ==
- List of public utilities
