= Aquarion =

Aquarion may refer to:

== Companies ==
- Aquarion AG, a Switzerland-based water treatment company with subsidiaries in the EU-MENA region
- Aquarion Water Company, a public water supply company in Connecticut

== Arts ==
- Genesis of Aquarion, a 2005 anime TV series
- Genesis of Aquarion (OVA), a 2007 original video animation series
- "Genesis of Aquarion" (song), a 2005 J-pop theme
