= Kentucky American Water =

Private utility company

- Kentucky American Water logo
- Current owner: American Water Works
- Markets: United States
- Website: https://amwater.com/kyaw

Kentucky American Water is an investor-owned utility company in the Commonwealth of Kentucky serving more than half a million people in portions of 14 counties. Kentucky American Water is a subsidiary of American Water, headquartered in Camden, New Jersey.

The company started life as the Lexington Hydraulic and Manufacturing Company in 1882, became the Lexington Water Company in 1922, and took its current name in 1973.

Jacobson Park was originally owned by Kentucky American Water until ownership was transferred to the Fayette Urban County Government in 2011.
