= D.C. Water Main Pumping Station =

- Main Sewerage Pumping Station
- U.S. National Register of Historic Places
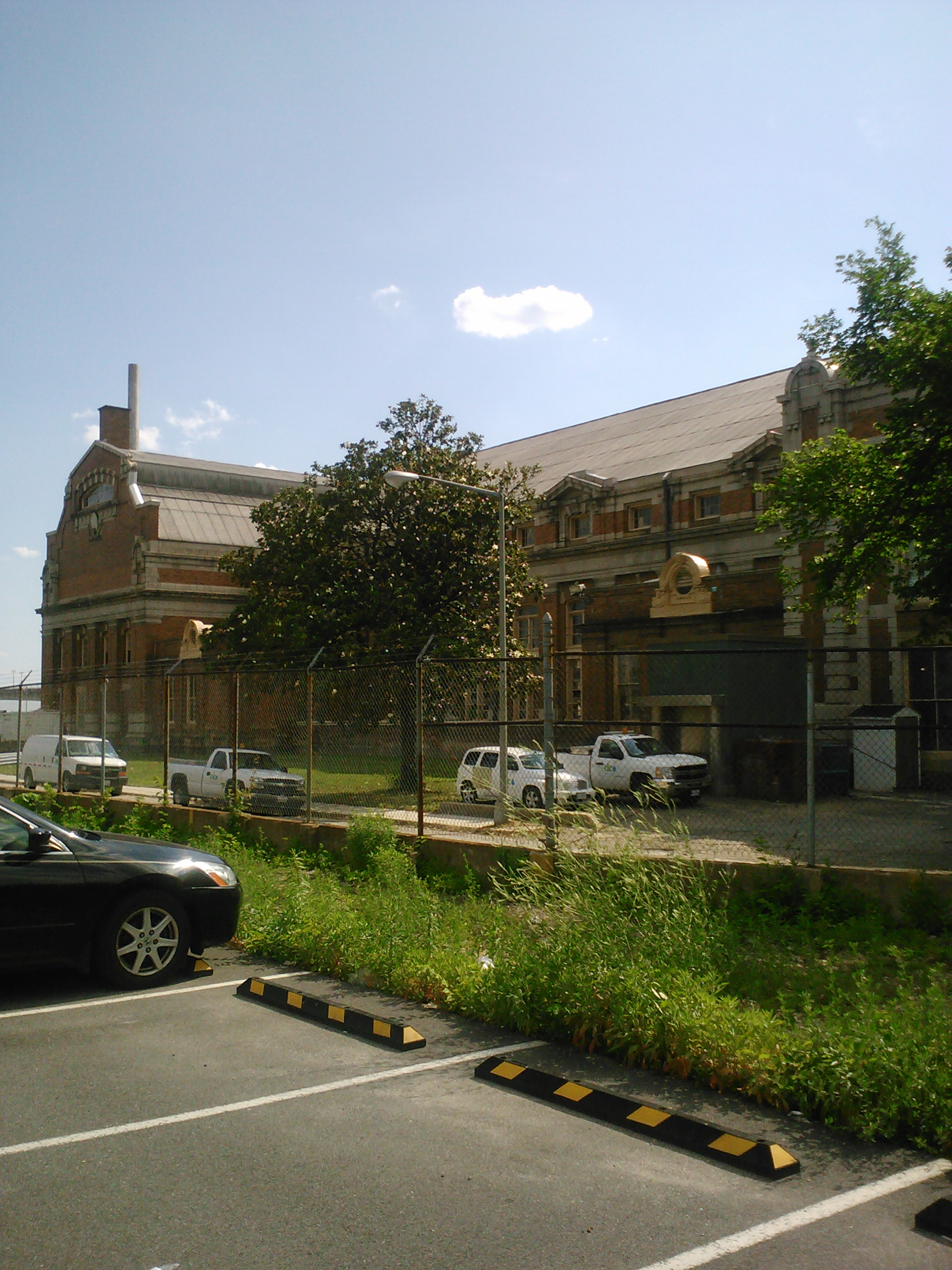
- East side of the pumping station (2012)

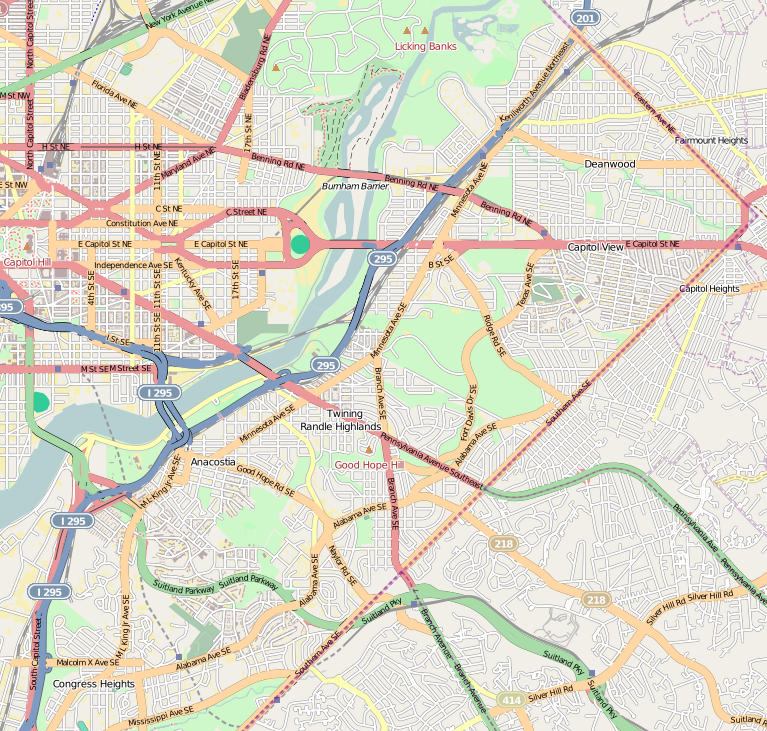
- Location within Washington, D.C. Location within the District of Columbia Location within the United States
- Location: 125 O Street, SE; Washington, D.C. United States
- Coordinates: 38°52′26″N 77°0′12″W
- Built: 1907
- Architect: Clement A. Didden
- Architectural style: Beaux Arts
- NRHP reference No.: 12000297
- Added to NRHP: May 24, 2012

The D.C. Water Main Pumping Station (or simply Main Pumping Station) is located at 125 O Street, SE in the Southeast Quadrant of Washington, D.C. on the Anacostia River between the Washington Navy Yard and Nationals Park.

== History ==
The Main Sewage Pumping Station is a historic two-and-a-half-story brick building built 1904–1907 in the Beaux Arts style with Renaissance Revival features. Local architect Clement A. Didden designed the building. The exterior is of reddish-brown brick with stone decoration, and the structure is formed of steel and concrete. It was influenced by the City Beautiful Movement of city-planning popular in the early 20th century.

The building was listed in the National Register of Historic Places on May 24, 2012.

== Current operation ==
The District of Columbia Water and Sewer Authority (DC Water) continues to operate the sewage pumping station and it is staffed continuously throughout the year.

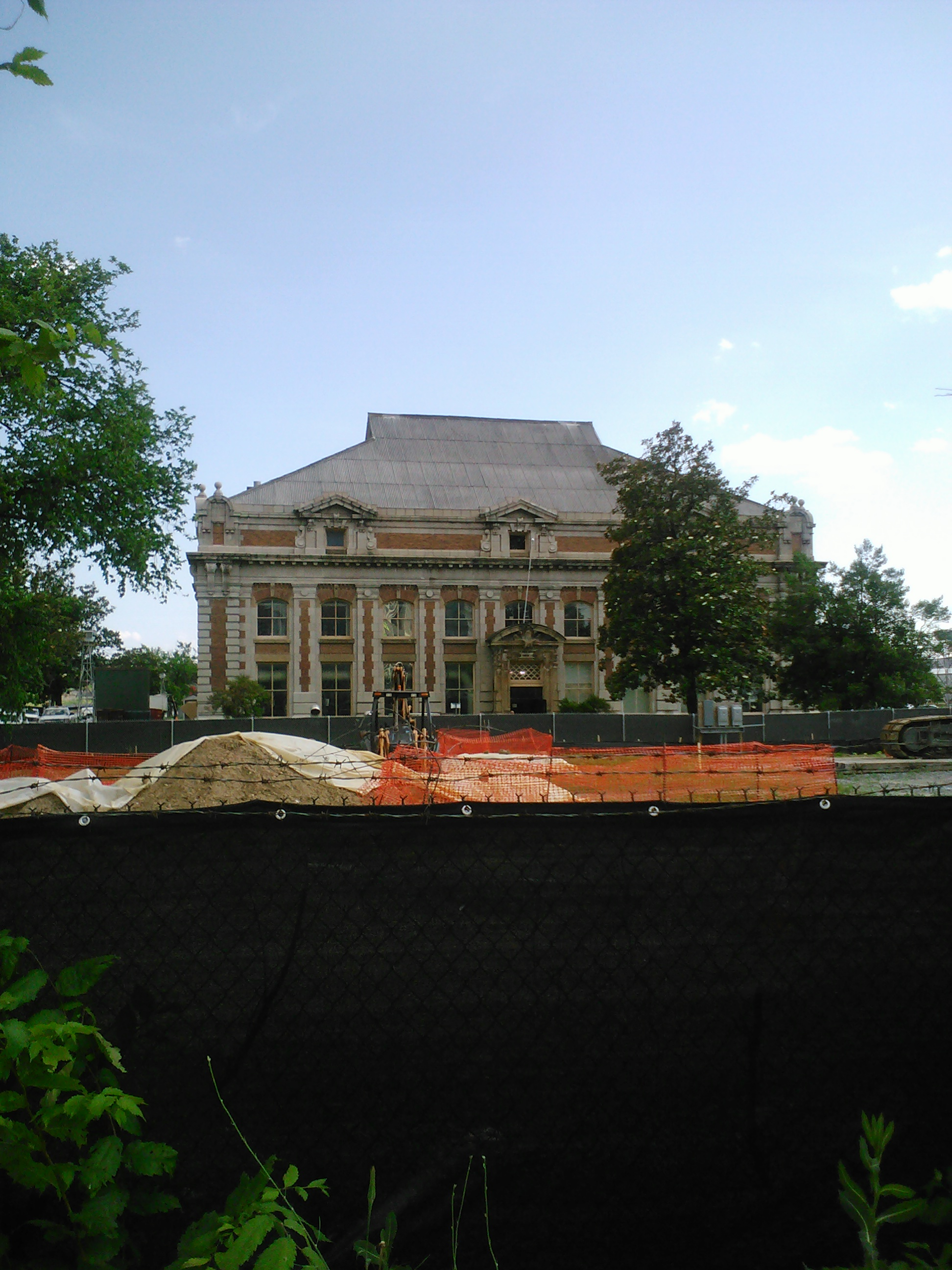
North side of the pumping station

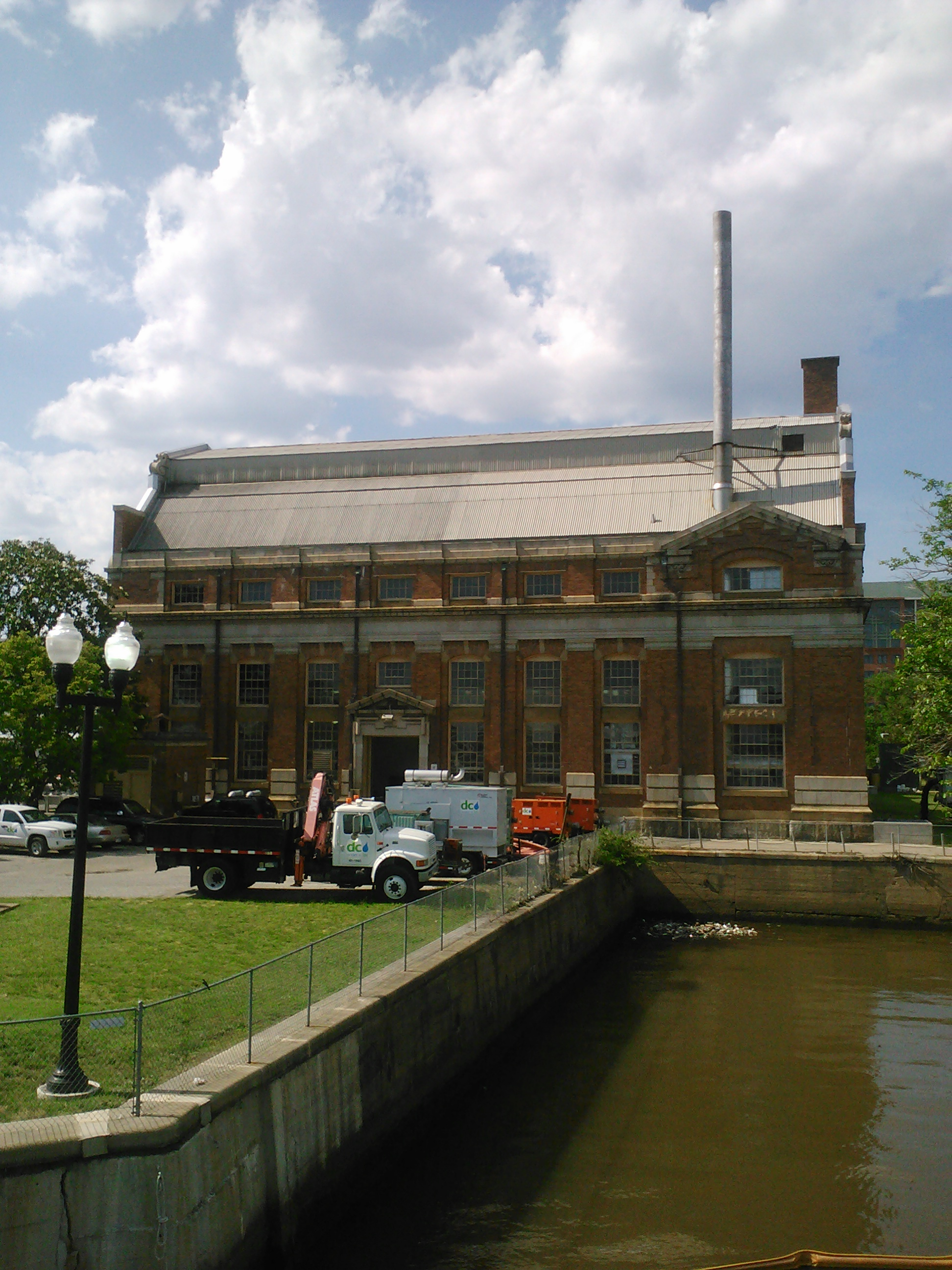
South side of the pumping station
