= Aquarion Water Company =

Privately-owned water utility in the United States

- Industry: Water utility
- Founded: 1857; 168 years ago
- Headquarters: Bridgeport, Connecticut, United States
- Area served: Connecticut, Massachusetts, New Hampshire
- Key people: Donald J. Morrissey, President
- Number of employees: 346
- Parent: Eversource Energy
- Website: www.aquarionwater.com

Aquarion Water Company is a water utility company based in the U.S. state of Connecticut that was first incorporated in 1857.

== Services ==
Aquarion Water Company provides regulated and non-regulated water related services in Connecticut, Massachusetts, and New Hampshire. The company is one of the seven largest investor-owned water utility companies in the United States.

The company also operates regional affiliated service subsidiaries including Abenaki Water Company and Torrington Water Company. These subsidiaries serve the households in the Belmont, New Hampshire area and the Torrington, Connecticut area, respectively.

In June 2017 Aquarion announced its merger with Eversource Energy for $1.675 billion. Aquarion would become a fully owned subsidiary and retain its own name, adding 300 employees and 230,000 customers in Connecticut, Massachusetts, and New Hampshire. In December 2017, the merger was completed after government approval.

On March 15, 2023, Connecticut legislators denied a rate increase by the company, instead approving a plan to lower the rates by $67 per year.

In 2025, Eversource Energy announced that Aquarion Water Company would be sold to a quasi-public corporation, the Aquarion Water Authority, which is a political subdivision of the State of Connecticut. The new authority would operate alongside the existing South Central Connecticut Regional Water Authority. As part of the deal, Aquarion's Massachusetts and New Hampshire subsidiaries will be sold to Unitil. As of July 2025, the sale is pending regulatory approval.
