= Middlesex Water Company =

- Type: Public
- Traded as: Nasdaq: MSEX; Russell 2000 component; S&P 600 component
- Founded: 1897; 129 years ago
- Headquarters: Iselin, New Jersey, U.S.
- Key people: Dennis W. Doll (chairman, president and CEO)
- Website: middlesexwater.com

Middlesex Water Company is a water utility based in the U.S. state of New Jersey that was first incorporated in 1897. The company declared an annual net income of $33.8M, with a revenue of $135.5M for fiscal year 2019.

== Services ==
The Middlesex Water Company provides regulated and non-regulated water related services in New Jersey and Delaware. These services include collecting, treating, distributing and selling water for domestic, commercial, municipal and industrial uses.

The company owns and operates regulated water utility and wastewater systems as well as operates water and wastewater systems under contract on behalf of municipal and private clients in New Jersey and Delaware. The company was awarded a $32 million contract to take responsibility for constructing and maintaining the water distribution system at Dover Air Force Base in Delaware for the next 50 years in September, 2013.

The company also operates regional affiliated service subsidiaries including Tidewater Utilities, Inc., Pinelands Water Company, Pinelands Wastewater Company, Twin Lakes Utilities, Inc., Utility Service Affiliates, Inc., Utility Service Affiliates (Perth Amboy) Inc., and Tidewater Environmental Systems, Inc. Tidewater's wholly owned subsidiaries include Southern Shores Water Company, LLC and White Marsh Environmental Systems, Inc. These companies are engaged in the business of helping small communities and real estate developers to address aging infrastructure issues as well as provide technical support for environmental regulations related to building and operating water distribution and treatment systems.

The company has two overall business segments:

- Regulated: The regulated business of collecting, treating and distributing water on a retail and wholesale basis to residential, commercial, industrial and fire protection customers in parts of New Jersey and Delaware. This segment also includes regulated wastewater systems in New Jersey and Delaware.
- Non-Regulated: Non-regulated contract services for the operation and maintenance of municipal and private water and wastewater systems in New Jersey and Delaware.

It is one of the few publicly held water utilities in the United States.

== Awards ==
In 2019, Middlesex Water’s Jay Kooper Wins General Counsel of the Year.

In 2013, Middlesex Water Company was named a finalist in the 2013 NJBIZ Business of the Year awards program. Tidewater Utilities, Inc., was named “Top Workplaces 2013” for the fifth time.

In 2009, Middlesex Water Company was named one of America's Fastest Growing Publicly Traded Small Companies. In 2008, Middlesex Water was honored as one of America's Top 100 Most Trustworthy Companies for its transparent financial reporting and conservative corporate governance. The company also was voted Outstanding Green Business in 2008 by the Edison Chamber of Commerce for its commitment to renewable energy and various sustainability initiatives.
