= District of Columbia Water and Sewer Authority =

Water authority of Washington, D.C.

DC Water

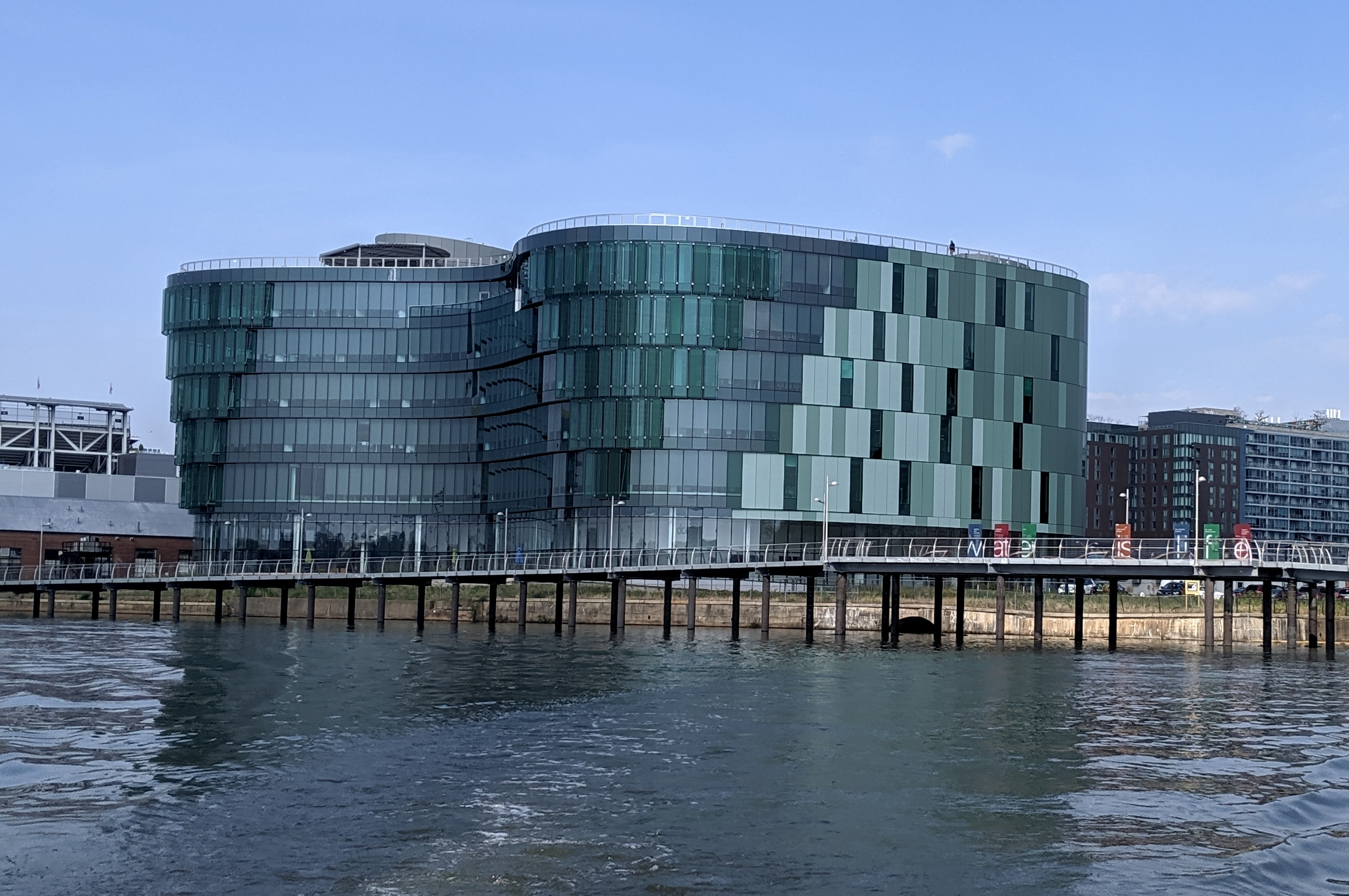
- HQO, DC Water's headquarters building, in Washington, D.C.

Agency overview
- Formed: 1996
- Type: Water and sewer utility
- Headquarters: 1385 Canal Street Southeast, Washington, D.C., U.S.; 38.873250°N 77.004640°W
- Motto: Water is life!
- Website: www.dcwater.com

The District of Columbia Water and Sewer Authority (DC Water) provides drinking water, sewage collection, and sewage treatment for the District of Columbia in the United States. The utility also provides wastewater treatment to several adjoining localities in Maryland and Virginia, and maintains more than 9,000 public fire hydrants in the District of Columbia.

DC Water was founded in 1996 when the district government and the U.S. federal government established it as an independent authority of the district's government.

== Service area ==
DC Water provides more than 600,000 residents, 16.6 million annual visitors, and 700,000 people employed in the District of Columbia with water, sewage collection, and treatment. The agency also provides wholesale wastewater treatment for 1.6 million people in Montgomery and Prince George's counties in Maryland, and Fairfax and Loudoun counties in Virginia.

== History ==
=== Drinking water ===
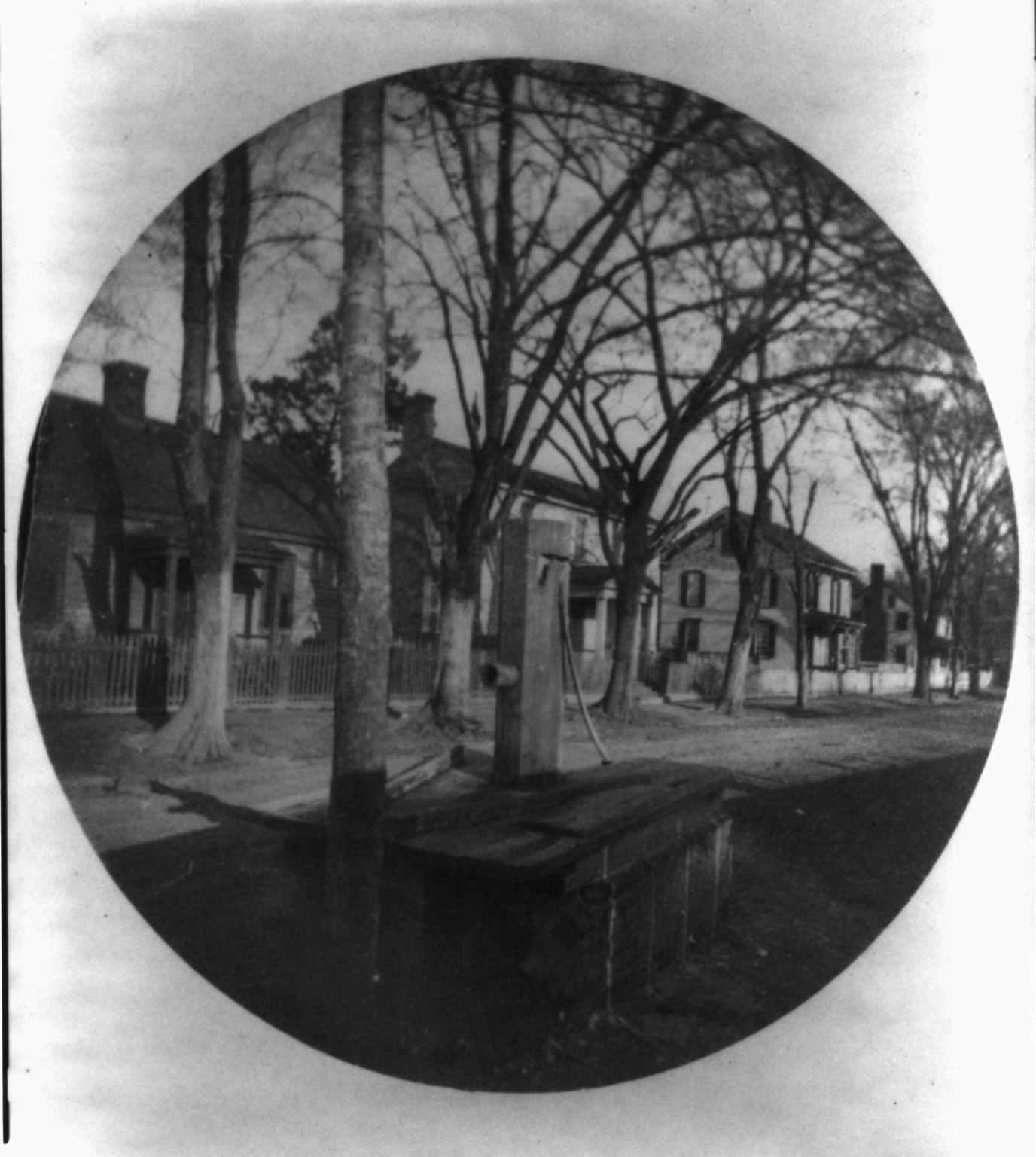
A wooden water pump on the street in Washington, D.C., in 1888

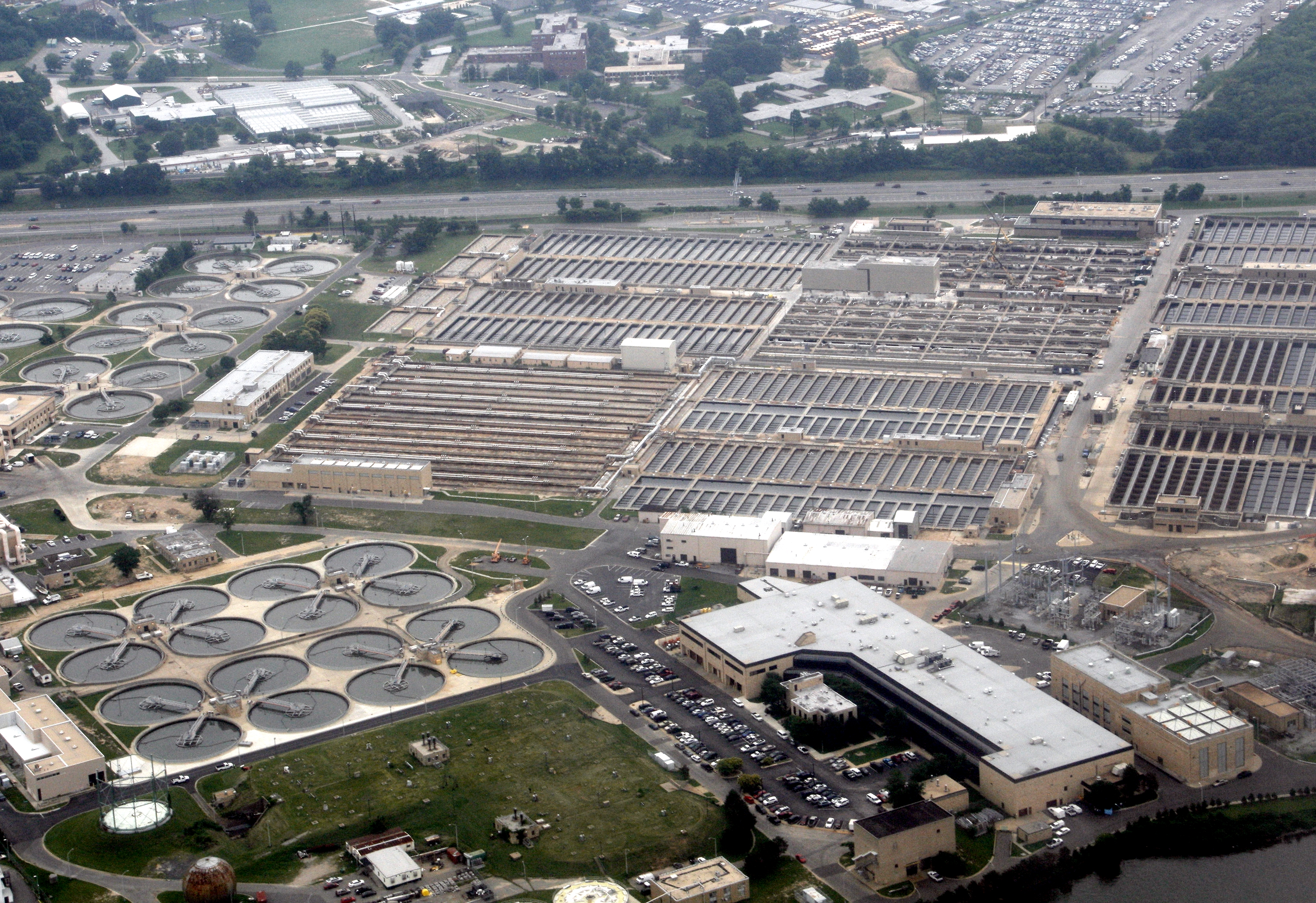
Blue Plains Wastewater Treatment Plant

In 1852, Congress commissioned the construction of an aqueduct system to provide a reliable supply of drinking water to the district from the Potomac River. The US Army Corps of Engineers designed and built the Washington Aqueduct, which began full operation in 1864. Filtration plants were added to the system in the 20th century.

=== Wastewater treatment ===
In 1938, the District of Columbia built a sewage treatment plant in the Blue Plains area, at the southernmost tip of DC. The cost was $4 million. The plant was built to stop raw sewage from entering the Potomac and Anacostia Rivers. At that time, the plant was built to treat sewage from a population of 650,000, with a capacity of 100 million gallons per day (mgd). By 1943, the population grew to 1.5 million people, contributing much more sewage, and upgrades to the plant were necessary. Secondary treatment units were added in 1959, with an expanded discharge capacity of 240 mgd. In the 1970s a major expansion commenced that led to construction of advanced wastewater treatment components, and by 1983 the capacity was 300 mgd. In addition to Washington, the plant serves several adjacent communities in Maryland and Virginia.

=== Agency reorganization and name change ===
Drinking water and sewage treatment services were initially provided by the District of Columbia government. DC Water was established as an independent agency in 1996 by the District Government and the U.S. federal government.

In 2010, under new leadership, the Authority underwent a rebranding effort. The rebranding included a new logo, a new color palette, and a new name. Since its inception, the Authority had been doing business as DC Water. The legal name of the agency remains the District of Columbia Water and Sewer Authority.

== Statistics ==
- Employees: 1,000 (FY 2009)
- Service area: 725 square miles (1,880 km2)
- Drinking water pumped: 108 million US gallons (410,000 m^{3}) a day (FY 2009)
- Drinking water distribution
  - Pipes: 1,300 miles (2,100 km)
  - Pumping Stations: 5
  - Reservoirs: 5
  - Elevated water storage tanks: 3
  - Valves: 36,000
  - Public Hydrants: 9,000+
- Sewers
  - Sanitary, Stormwater, and combined sewers: over 1,800 miles (2,900 km)
  - Flow-metering stations: 22
  - Wastewater pumping stations: 9
    - including the Main Pumping Station
- Blue Plains Advanced Wastewater Treatment Plant
  - Largest advanced wastewater treatment plant in the world
  - 150 acres (0.61 km^{2})
  - Capacity: 370 million US gallons (1,400,000 m^{3}) per day
  - Peak capacity: 1.076 billion US gallons (4,070,000 m^{3}) per day.

== Governance ==
An eleven-member Board of Directors governs DC Water. Six Board Members represent the District. Prince George's County and Montgomery County each have two Board Members. Fairfax County has a single Board Member. Each participating jurisdiction is a signatory to the Blue Plains Intermunicipal Agreement, which spells out the roles and responsibilities for each party and addresses facilities management, capacity allocation, and financing.

The Authority develops its own budget, which is then included in the overall District of Columbia budget. Together these two budgets are presented annually to Congress for approval.

When DC Water was created as an independent authority in 1996, its finances were separate from those of the District of Columbia. The independence of DC Water with regard to finance, procurement and personnel matters was affirmed by Congress under the District of Columbia Water and Sewer Authority Independence Preservation Act of 2008.

== Operations ==
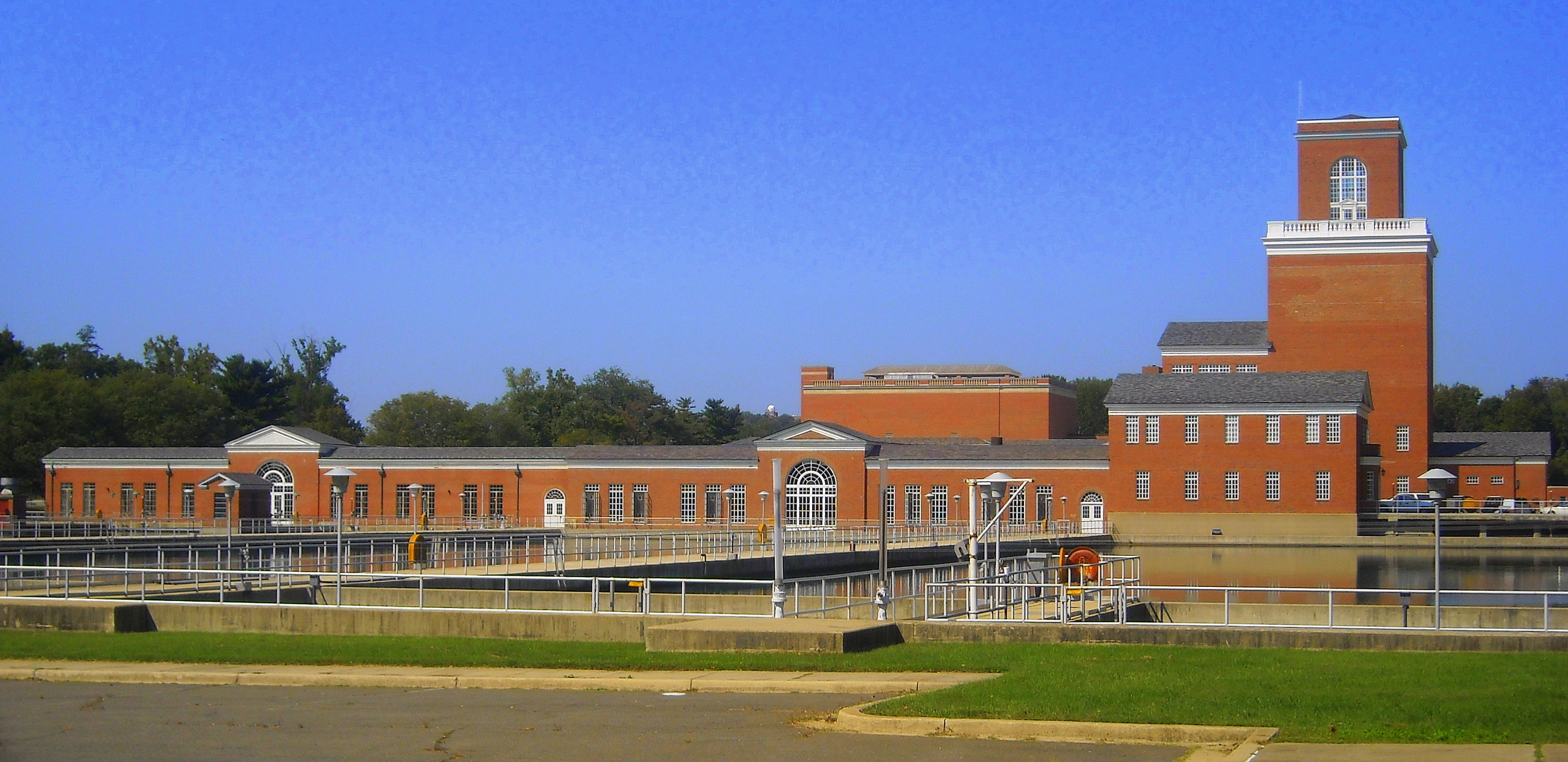
Dalecarlia Water Treatment Plant, operated by the Washington Aqueduct

A General Manager and CEO is responsible for all daily operations and reports to the DC Water Board of Directors. The current GM/CEO is David L. Gadis.

DC Water purchases drinking water from the Washington Aqueduct division of the Army Corps of Engineers. The Aqueduct sources the water from the Potomac River at Great Falls and Little Falls, north of the District. The Aqueduct treats the water, and DC Water distributes it through 1,300 miles (2,100 km) of water pipes throughout the District of Columbia.

DC Water also manages over 1,800 miles (2,900 km) of sewer lines and operates the Blue Plains Advanced Wastewater Treatment Plant. The plant discharges to the Potomac River at the southernmost tip of the District.

DC Water Headquarters operates out of a 150,000-square-foot office building (14,000 m^{2}) completed in 2017. Designed by SmithGroup and constructed by Skanska, the facility achieved LEED Platinum certification and incorporates sustainable features such as a wastewater heat recovery system and advanced daylighting strategies.

== Awards ==
The National Association of Clean Water Agencies (NACWA) honored DC Water with its Research and Technology Award, given annually to member agencies who contribute to the field of biosolids usage and disposal or wastewater treatment. The research project must be completed in-house (or by a contractor working directly with the agency). It must relate to the collection process, treatment process, or reuse of wastewater. This innovation by the DC Water team has a global impact in protecting aquatic life in waterways that receive wastewater discharges. The year 2010 marks the second consecutive year that DC Water has been recognized with this award.

In 2010, DC Water received from NACWA the Platinum Peak Performance Award after receiving five consecutive Gold Awards for 100 percent compliance with permit limits. This award is presented to member agencies for exceptional compliance for their National Pollutant Discharge Elimination System (NPDES) permit limits.

From 2017-2021, the DC Water Headquarters, design by SmithGroup and constructed by Skanska, won 19 awards for design including a Fast Company Innovation by Design Award - Spaces, Places, Cities; American Institute of Architects (AIA) - National Innovation Award - Holistic Design; and a Planet Positive Award from Metropolis Magazine.

== Funding ==
Rates paid by ratepayers cover the cost of delivery of water and sewer service. A little more than half of the rates cover operations. Another quarter covers the cost of capital projects like replacement of aging water and sewer lines, valve replacements, and pump station improvements. Capital projects also include several projects designed to protect the environment and are required by the U.S. Environmental Protection Agency (EPA). Though the mandate comes from the federal government, the funding sources for these construction projects are not identified. While a small amount of funding has come through the Clean Water Act and Safe Drinking Water Act and other grants, the majority of these capital costs are borne by the ratepayers.

== Environmental stewardship ==
At Blue Plains, wastewater treatment goes beyond primary and secondary treatment levels to tertiary (or advanced) treatment. The effluent that leaves Blue Plains and is discharged to the Potomac is highly treated and meets NPDES permit limits in the United States.

Historically, wastewater treatment plants have contributed nutrients such as phosphorus and nitrogen to the waterways in which they discharge. These nutrients have been found to deplete oxygen in the marine environment, a process that is detrimental to fish and other aquatic life.

Since the mid-1980s, Blue Plains has reduced phosphorus to the limit of technology, primarily in support of water quality goals of the Potomac River, but also for the restoration of the Chesapeake Bay. The Chesapeake Bay Agreement, reached in 1987, was a first step in reducing nitrogen discharge to waterways that are tributary to the Chesapeake Bay. Under the agreement, the Bay states and the District committed to voluntarily reduce nitrogen loads by 40 percent from their 1985 levels. Blue Plains was the first plant to achieve that goal. Furthermore, every year since the full-scale implementation of the Biological Nitrogen Removal (BNR) process was completed in 2000, Blue Plains has every year successfully achieved and exceeded that goal of a 40 percent reduction. In Fiscal Year 2009, the BNR process at Blue Plains reduced the nitrogen load by more than 58 percent.

DC Water and EPA agreed upon new nitrogen limits as part of the NPDES permit effective September 2010, reducing nitrogen levels to 4.7 million pounds per year. DC Water plans to achieve these levels by constructing new facilities at Blue Plains to perform enhanced nitrogen removal (ENR). The total cost of the project is nearly $1 billion.

In FY 09, the Authority rehabilitated pumping equipment and accessories in one of two stations that pump incoming wastewater into the plant and replaced aged infrastructure and equipment in the plant's final filters with a more effective system. All the upgrade projects were tied into the plant-wide process control system (PCS), which monitors and controls the plant's processes from a central location.

Progress was achieved by implementing the nitrification/denitrification facilities upgrade to convert nitrification reactors from coarse to fine bubble diffusion and modify structures equipment. The rehabilitated and new equipment will support other ongoing upgrades to the nitrification/denitrification process and aims to meet the nitrogen reduction goals of the Chesapeake Bay Program. It will also increase energy efficiency.

On the waterways, the Authority operates two skimmer boats that remove floatable debris from the Anacostia and Potomac rivers every Monday through Friday. These crews remove more than 400 tons of trash from our waterways each year.

In addition to their full-time work assignments, these crews clean the way for special events like the Nation's Triathlon and high school crew competitions, as well as for conservation efforts.

As a result of the work DC Water contributes, "The District, as a city, is head and shoulders above any other municipality in the Bay watershed," said Tom Schueler of the nonprofit Chesapeake Stormwater Network. In 2009, The Stormwater Network developed a stormwater performance grading scale. The District received the highest grade of B+.

== DC Water Clean Rivers Project ==
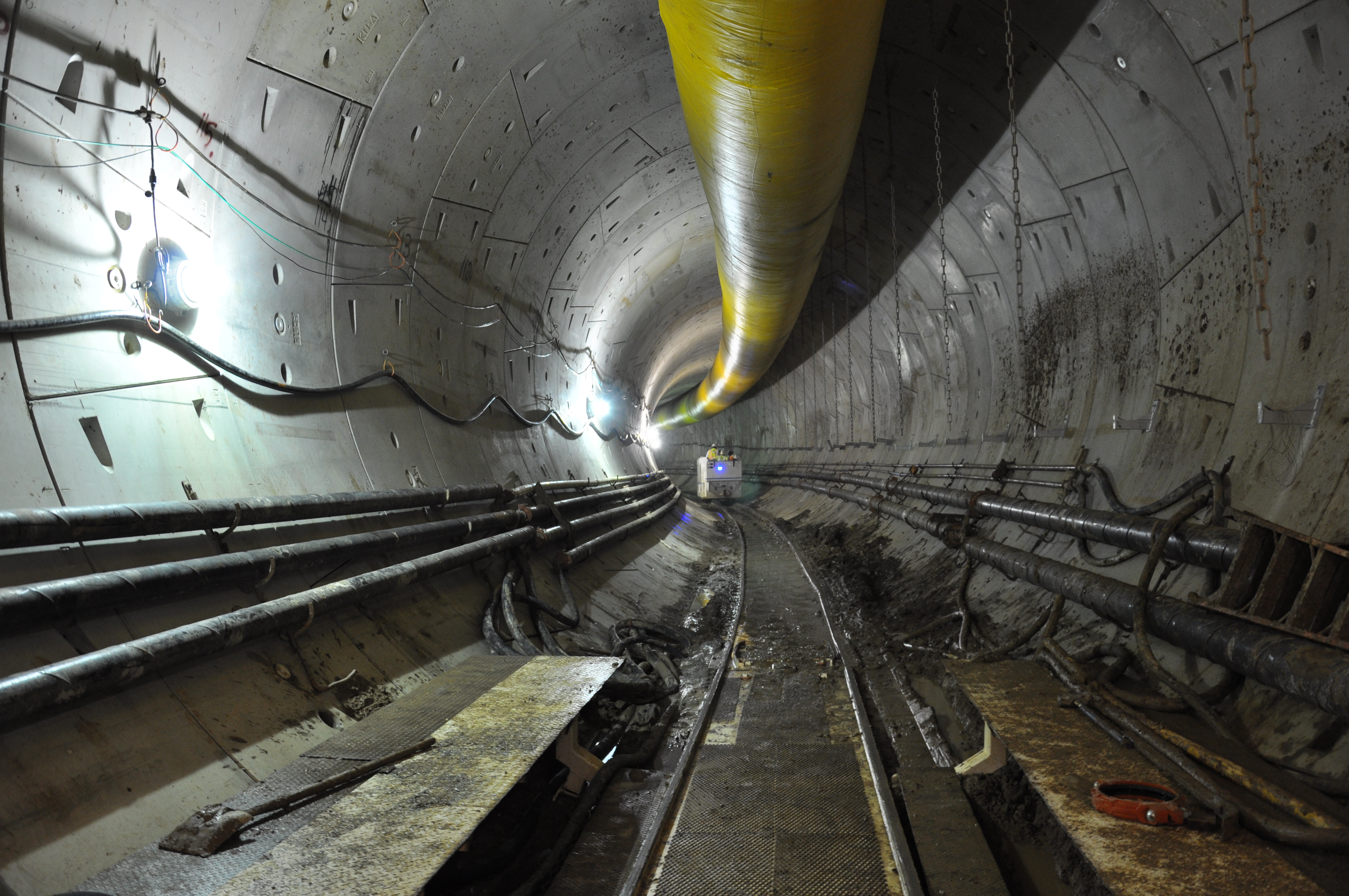
Construction workers check on progress inside a tunnel in the Clean Rivers Project

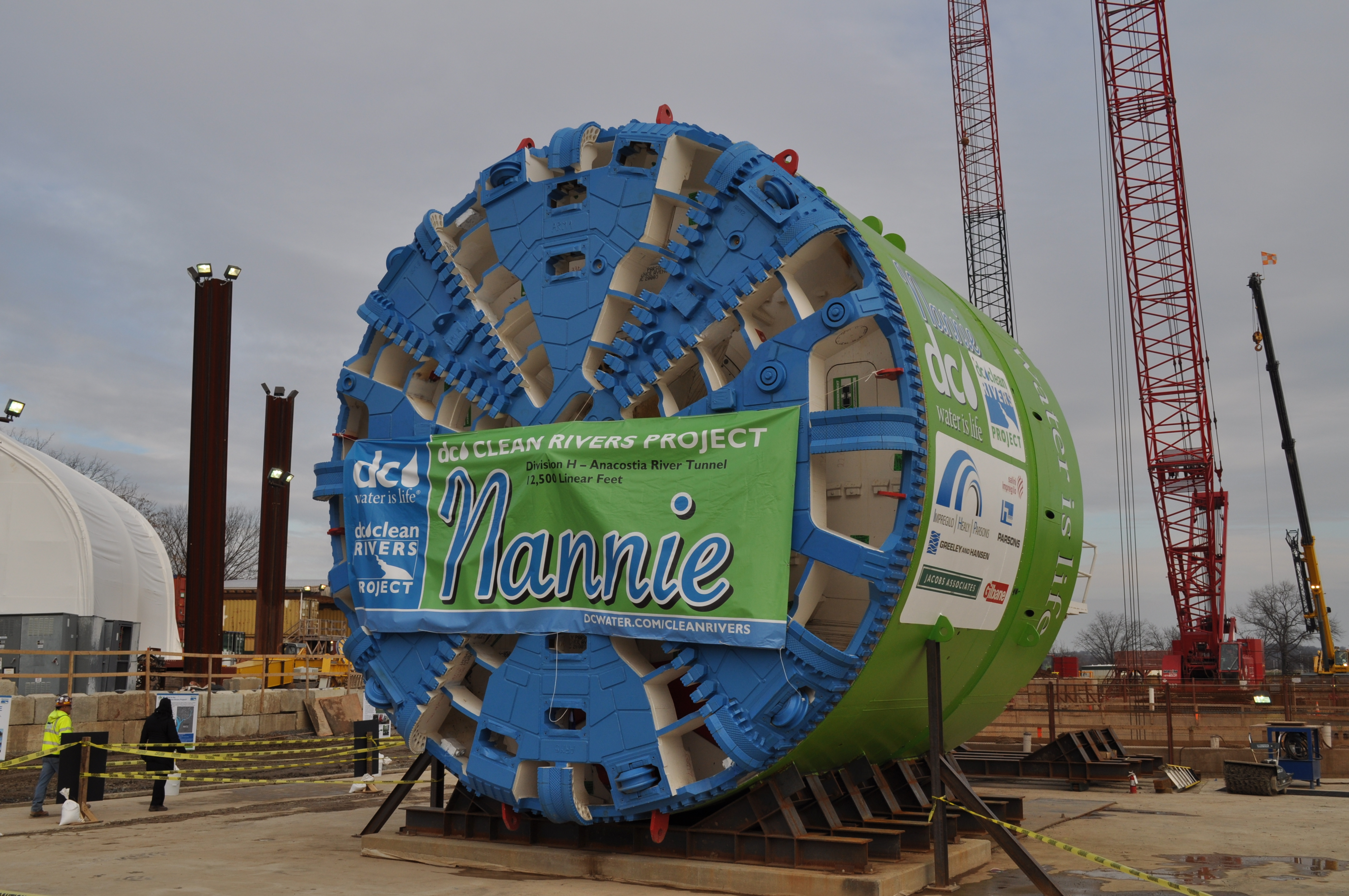
Cutting head of a tunnel boring machine used in the Clean Rivers Project

The District of Columbia is one of 772 older cities in the country with a combined sewer system. The system covers about a third of the district and was built in the late 19th century to carry sanitary sewage and stormwater in the same pipe. The system operates well in dry weather. However, during rainstorms, the flow can exceed the capacity of the pipe. To prevent sewer backups and flooded streets, these combined sewers may discharge into the Anacostia and Potomac Rivers and Rock Creek, a phenomenon known as combined sewer overflows (CSOs).

To date, DC Water has significantly reduced CSOs by eliminating approximately 40 percent of the overflows through a $140 million construction and mitigation program. This investment included inflatable dams to catch and store overflows during rainstorms, tide gates to keep river water from flowing into the sewer system, sewer separation to eliminate CSO outfalls, and pumping station construction and rehabilitation to increase flow capacity.

In 2013 the agency began construction of a deep tunnel system for its "Clean Rivers Project." The tunnel system stores the combined sewage during wet weather and releases it gradually for treatment at Blue Plains. Portions of the storage tunnel system are in operation as of 2025, with project completion scheduled for 2030. The $2.99 billion project includes construction of 18 miles (29 km) of tunnels, as well as green infrastructure projects, and is expected to reduce CSO discharges by 96%.

== Lead contamination in drinking water ==
In 2001 the drinking water in DC was found to contain lead levels of at least 1,250 parts per billion (ppb)—about 83 times higher than the accepted safe level of 15 ppb. The problem was traced to a decision by the Washington Aqueduct to replace the chlorine used to treat the water with monochloramine, a similar chemical. The chloramine treatment corroded the pipes, dissolving lead solder throughout the system. The Aqueduct subsequently started adding orthophosphate, a corrosion inhibitor, to the water, which reduced the extent of lead leaching from the pipes. In 2017 DC Water reported that the drinking water system was in compliance with EPA standards for lead.

== See also ==
- Loudoun County Sanitation Authority
- Washington Suburban Sanitary Commission (WSSC) - serves Montgomery and Prince George's Counties
