= Loudoun County Sanitation Authority =

Sanition authority in Loudoun, US

In May 1959, the Loudoun County Board of Supervisors created Loudoun County Sanitation Authority (LCSA) by a resolution, through the Water and Waste Authorities Act, for the sole purpose of providing water and wastewater service to residents of the unincorporated areas of the county. LCSA rebranded and moved from Leesburg to Ashburn in April 2008. It now does business as Loudoun Water.

Loudoun Water is a political subdivision of the state, similar to a town or a county government. All income is received either as user fees from customers or availability fees from developers. User fees pay for operating expenses. Availability fees pay for capital improvements. Loudoun Water receives no tax revenues.

== Board of directors ==
Loudoun Water's nine-member Board governs how it operates and generally meets every second Thursday of the month. These meetings are open to the public. Each member of the Board is appointed at-large by the Loudoun County Board of Supervisors and serves a four-year term. These terms are staggered, so that every year, two members are re-appointed and every fourth year, three members are re-appointed. The Authority's Board appoints a General Manager who is responsible for the daily management of Loudoun Water.

== Water and Wastewater Operations ==
Loudoun Water purchases its water from Fairfax Water (Fairfax County Water Authority) and Loudoun Water's Trap Rock Water Treatment Facility. A small percentage of Loudoun Water's customers are part of Community Systems. Customers within these systems have community wells and / or small communal wastewater systems. Wastewater in the Central Service Area is sent to the Broad Run Water Reclamation Facility, owned and operated by Loudoun Water, or conveyed via the Potomac Interceptor to the Blue Plains Advanced Wastewater Treatment Plant operated by the District of Columbia Water and Sewer Authority.

== Education ==
Loudoun Water created an indoor education center and outdoor interpretive area called The Aquiary (ā•kwee•air•ee). The Aquiary is like a water museum, full of interactive exhibits and interpretive trails that tell the story of drinking water treatment and delivery; source water protection; water conservation and water reclamation. The Aquiary was named by one of the citizen members of the advisory group that advised Loudoun Water on the content and appearance of the space. It is a made-up word that rhymes with aviary, and means “a place for Loudoun water learning and appreciation.” Brainstorming for the space and the trail system began in 2003 when Loudoun Water first decided to build a campus in Ashburn, next to its Operations and Maintenance facility. Loudoun Water worked with consultants and a citizen advisory group, comprising a diverse array of Loudoun Water customer volunteers, to develop the exhibits and the space.

Loudoun Water has intended the Aquiary to serve as a learning and teaching tool for Loudoun County Public Schools, and consulted with teachers and the school administration to ensure its effectiveness as a field trip destination.

The Aquiary is a National Wildlife Federation certified national wildlife habitat.
