= Essential Utilities =

American utility company

Essential Utilities, Inc.
- Type: Public
- Traded as: NYSE: WTRG; S&P 400 component
- Industry: Water and Natural Gas Utilities
- Founded: January 4, 1886; 140 years ago
- Headquarters: Bryn Mawr, Pennsylvania, United States
- Key people: Christopher H. Franklin, CEO; Daniel J. Schuller, CFO; Colleen Arnold, President, Aqua; Michael Huwar, President, Peoples; Christopher Luning, General Counsel
- Revenue: ▲US$1,878M (2021)
- Net income: ▲US$431M (2021)
- Total assets: ▲US$14.66B (2021)
- Total equity: ▲US$5.18B (2021)
- Number of employees: 3,211
- Website: www.essential.co

Essential Utilities (formerly Aqua America and Peoples Natural Gas) is an American utility company that has stakes in Illinois, Indiana, Kentucky, New Jersey, North Carolina, Ohio, Pennsylvania, Texas and Virginia. The company provides drinking water and wastewater treatment infrastructure and natural gas. Essential Utilities is the publicly traded ($WTRG) parent company that oversees the continued business of Aqua America and Peoples Natural Gas, who both continue to do business under their original names.

The company began in Pennsylvania and remains headquartered in Bryn Mawr along with the water utility side of the business while the natural gas company Peoples is headquartered in Pittsburgh.

== History ==
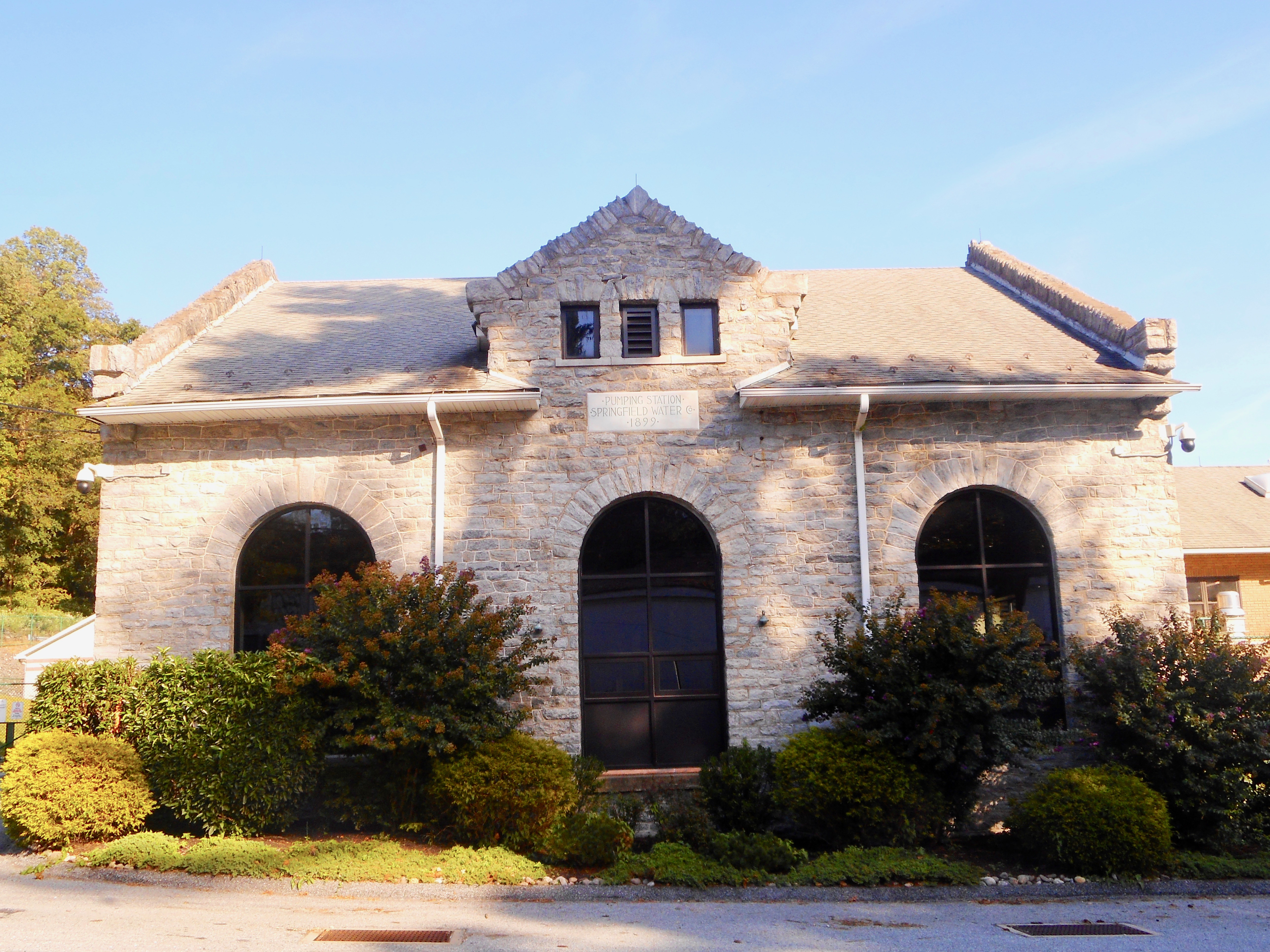
Springfield Water Company pumping station, built in 1899

The company began January 4, 1886, by the founding of the Springfield Water Company. The company changed its name to the Philadelphia Suburban Water Company (PSW). By 1925 the company provided water to 58 municipalities.

The company was incorporated in 1989. The current CEO, Christopher H. Franklin, took his position in 2015. In late 2014, the company committed to transitioning its Pennsylvania vehicle fleet to compressed natural gas (CNG) within five years.

In October 2025, American Water Works agreed to acquire the company in an all-stock merger, creating a combined company valued at $63 billion, including debt. Upon completion of the deal, expected in early 2027, American Water shareholders would own about 69% of the combined company, with Essential shareholders owning the remainder.

== Acquisitions ==
In the United States, many water utilities remain government-owned. Water was supplied by 55,000 separate water systems in 2006. However, US and global companies have business models which involve the privatization of utilities to achieve profitability from economy of scale. Additionally, cash-strapped municipalities see benefit to selling their water supply assets.

From 1993 to 2013 Aqua America completed 300 acquisitions. In recent years, the company has purchased smaller private utilities across 12 states, gradually extending southward. Such acquisitions comprise the bulk of Aqua America's stated business model.

In January 1998 Aqua America, then known as the Philadelphia Suburban Water Company (PSW) purchased the West Chester, PA municipal water utility assets. Acquisitions of large private companies included the purchases of AquaSource in 2003, Heater and Florida Water Services in 2004, and the New York Water Service Corporation in 2007.

In October 2018 Aqua announced that it was going to purchase Peoples Natural Gas in Pittsburgh PA for $4.27 billion. This deal entered Aqua into the competitive Pittsburgh water market while taking their first step into gas utilities.

== Subsidiaries ==
The company's largest water subsidiary is Aqua Pennsylvania, which has been a part of Aqua America since 1996 and accounts for slightly more than half of 2007 operating revenue and provides water services to 50% of the company's total customer base. Aqua Pennsylvania operates in the greater urban and suburban Philadelphia area.

== See also ==
- Pennsylvania Public Utility Commission
- Utilities Commission
