= Aquarion AG =

Swiss water treatment company

Coordinates: 47°10′59.7″N 8°31′6.9″E

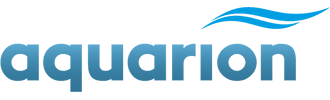
- Type: Private company
- Industry: Engineering, procurement, and construction
- Founded: 2013
- Headquarters: Baar, canton of Zug, Switzerland
- Key people: Karl Michael Millauer, CEO; Günter Heisler, Member of the board
- Products: Provider of solutions and technologies for watersystems, oil & gas industry, energy sector, semiconductor and others.
- Revenue: >60 million EUR (2018), 60.6 million EUR (Q4'18–Q3'19)
- Parent: Clean Tech GP Ltd., London, UK
- Website: aquarion-group.com

Aquarion AG, headquartered in Baar, Switzerland, is a company specialising in wastewater treatment and water purification systems for the oil and gas industry, the energy sector, and other process industries.

== History ==
In June 2014, Aquarion acquired Hager + Elsässer out of insolvency. On 22 July 2015, Aquarion entered an agreement with Canadian BluMetric Environmental Inc., under which the companies will jointly address wastewater issues. Also in 2015, Aquarion established wholly owned subsidiary in the UAE.

=== 2019 IPO ===
Aquarion AG is looking to complete its IPO in 2019.

=== Acquisitions ===
Company	Headquartered	Date	Ref
Membran-Filtrations-Technik GmbH	Cologne, Germany	2018-08	
Hager + Elsaesser Inc	Stuttgart, Germany	2014-06	
Gemwater s.r.l.	Milan, Italy	2012	
H2Oil & Gas Ltd.	Cardiff, UK		

=== Logo ===
Old logo of Aquarion AG.

The company earlier used another logo. Consisting of an "a".
