= Centrifuge (disambiguation) =

A centrifuge is a device that uses centrifugal force to separate its components.

Centrifuge may also refer to:

- Various types of centrifuges
  - Laboratory centrifuge, a laboratory equipment which spins liquid samples at high speed
  - Peeler centrifuge, a device that performs by rotating filtration basket in an axis
  - Gas centrifuge, a device that performs isotope separation of gases
  - Zippe-type centrifuge, a gas centrifuge designed to enrich the rare fissile isotope uranium-235
  - Decanter centrifuge, a device that employs a high rotational speed to separate components of different densities
  - Large diameter centrifuge, any centrifuge extending several meters
  - Ultracentrifuge, a centrifuge optimized for spinning a rotor at very high speeds
  - Solid bowl centrifuge, a type of centrifuge that uses the principle of sedimentation
  - Conical plate centrifuge, a type of centrifuge which provides a parallel configuration of centrifugation spaces
  - Screen scroll centrifuge, a filtering or screen centrifuge
  - Pusher centrifuge, a type of filtration technique
- The machine used for high-g training of aviators by simulating g-force
- Centrifuge (camps), a series of Christian summer camps
- Spin (physics), the spin direction in quantum mechanics
- Various manufacturing techniques:
  - Centrifugal casting (industrial), a casting technique typically used to cast large thin-walled cylinders such as pipes
  - Centrifugal casting (silversmithing), a casting technique typically used to make small, highly detailed forms
  - Spin casting, a technique to produce small, detailed castings
  - Spin casting (mirrors) a technique for constructing large parabolic mirrors
- Centrifuge Accommodations Module, a cancelled element of the International Space Station
