= Conical plate centrifuge =

Type of centrifuge

A conical plate centrifuge (also known as a disc bowl centrifuge or disc stack separator) is a type of centrifuge that has a series of conical discs which provides a parallel configuration of centrifugation spaces.

The conical plate centrifuge is used to remove solids (usually impurities) from liquids or to separate two liquid phases from each other by means of an enormously high centrifugal force. The denser solids or liquids which are subjected to these forces move outwards towards the rotating bowl wall while the less dense fluids moves towards the centre. The special plates (known as disc stacks) increase the surface settling area which speeds up the separation process. Different stack designs, arrangements and shapes are used for different processes depending on the type of feed present. The concentrated denser solid or liquid is then removed continuously, manually or intermittently, depending on the design of the conical plate centrifuge. This centrifuge is very suitable for clarifying liquids that have small proportion of suspended solids.

== Basic fundamentals ==
The centrifuge works by using the inclined plate settler principle. A set of parallel plates with a tilt angle θ with respect to horizontal plane is installed to reduce the distance of the particle settling. The reason for the tilted angle is to allow the settled solids on the plates to slide down by gravitational force so they do not accumulate and clog the channel formed between adjacent plates.

== Available designs ==
=== Nozzle-type centrifuge ===
This type of centrifuge removes solid matter from liquid feed from the plates. A centrifugal pump creates a pressure to discharge the clear liquid from the centrifuge. The solid is extracted through nozzles continuously, as shown in Figure 2. The quantity of concentrate depends on speed of bowl rotation, number of nozzles per centrifuge, radius of the nozzle’s position and the nozzle diameter. The quality depends on volume of concentrate discharged, and concentration and volume of the liquid fed into the centrifuge. The concentration of the discharge through the nozzle is varied by adjusting the diameter of the nozzle and initial volume of liquid feed.

Pre-treatment includes strainers in the feed lines to prevent coarse solid impurities clogging the nozzles. Generally, the diameter of the holes of the pre-treatment filter is about 10% smaller than nozzle diameter.

=== Manual-cleaning centrifuge ===
A manual-cleaning centrifuge have a ‘solid bowl’ (also known as solid retaining bowl). It is applicable in industrial separation processes wherein the primary objective is to separate two liquid phases with minimal or no solids.

The lighter and heavier liquids exit separately through the respective outlets at the top of the centrifuge. Solids, if any, are retained in the bowl of the centrifuge and need to be manually evacuated by stopping the centrifuge and cleaning out the sludge space inside the bowl. The simpler design does not have the hydraulic mechanism for sludge ejection thereby eliminating the need for operating water.

=== Self-cleaning centrifuge ===
The conical plate centrifuge is easily sterilized and fully contained, making it a popular choice for the manufacturing of sterile products like vaccines and antibodies.

Lighter and heavier liquid exit separately through the top of the centrifuge, while the sludge is discharged intermittently through the nozzles. Another type of self-cleaning centrifuge has a removable chamber bottom. Both methods can be controlled independently or automatically, either time-controlled or depending on quality of discharge through nozzle

Depending on the design, the feed enters through the top or bottom inlet. Once clarified on the conical plates, product is discharged under pressure through the outlet. Separated solids, or sludge, are accumulated in the conical space adjacent to the nozzle. Once full (without exceeding the area of the plates), a piston is set to hydraulically open each nozzle ports, ejecting the sludge. Generally, water is used as the service fluid, acting as a piston to control the nozzle. During sludging, the water is injected to open the nozzle and drained to close it.

=== Hermetic centrifuge ===
This type of separator is a closed (hermetic) centrifuge; it can be a chamber or conical plate bowl. This centrifuge can accommodate a system with a maximum pressure of 8 bars. The feed and discharge inlet are attached to the rotating bowl. The head of the centrifuge contains a built-in rotary feed and discharge pumps. It is extremely useful for:

- Liquid feed that cannot have a decreasing pressure
- Liquid feed that cannot withstand impact at inlet, where the solid particles require a ‘delicate touch’ (e.g. protein).
- Liquid feed which easily oxidises
- Liquid feed that emits gas or evaporates (e.g. beers and cold wort)

== Range of application ==
=== Oil and gas industry ===
Conical plate centrifuge can be used to remove water, salts and solids to condition fuels for gas turbine. It also removes some heavy phase liquid and fine solids to obtain high purity liquid fuel. On the other hand, the centrifuge is also useful for treating water, an oil and gas by product, by removing oil contaminants before discharging back to the sea, as required by law. Moreover, emulsion of oil and water can be further treated to produce more oil by separating oil, water and impurities using the conical plate centrifuge.

Disc stack centrifuge is also useful in producing biodiesel, as an initiative to alternative energy sources. The centrifuge separates fuel from methanol or water to convert oils from raw materials (such as rape seed) into diesel fuel. Oil additives is used to improve fuel performances, and in order to remove as much contaminants as possible, this type of centrifuge is used to separate excess fine solids such as metal salts and lime.

=== Process industry ===
In paper coating, the conical plate centrifuge cleans and sorts the ‘kaolin’ (a material which gives paper its glossy look in certain grades of paper) according to its particle size. The separator for this process needs a design that can withstand abrasion caused by kaolin. Additionally, this centrifuge is also used to remove water, impurities and other metal particles from oils and lubricants used for dynamic processes, such as motors, compressors and hydraulics. This treatment is reliable in extending the service life of the equipment.

=== Biological science ===
Hermetic cell culture centrifuge is used to harvest cell cultures from mammals. The feed enters the bottom of the liquid—filled centrifuge (ensuring air-free for cell separation) and a hollow spindle prevents instant acceleration of the feed, minimising damage to the sensitive cell membrane. The outlet is air-free to reduce foaming. This centrifuge can also be cleaned and sanitised in place (SIP and CIP systems) without major dismantling to ensure the operations remains hygienic.

=== Food processing ===
In beer brewing, kieselguhr (an off-white powder known as diatomaceous earth) is used to filter water from the alcoholic beverages. The addition of a conical plate centrifuge will reduce the usage of kieselguhr, be more economical and time-efficient, as well as minimise product loss.

In olive oil production, high speed separators are extensively used, therefore conical plate centrifuge is highly recommended because it ensures efficient separation with minimal oil heating and oxidation. For cold-pressed lemon oil (etheric oil), it needs a separator specifically designed to handle the delicate nature and value of the oil. A hermetic centrifuge is best for this purpose because it can prevent product contamination and losses.

== Advantages and limitations over competitive processes ==
=== Tubular bowl centrifuge ===
Both conical plate centrifuge and tubular bowl centrifuge can be used for liquid/liquid and solid/liquid separation. However, the advantage of conical plate centrifuge over tubular bowl centrifuge is that solid discharge is possible in conical plate but recovery of solids in tubular bowl is difficult and there is limited solid capacity. As the liquid discharge in conical plate centrifuge is under high pressure, this eliminates foaming but foaming is present in tubular bowl centrifuges unless special skimming or centripetal pumps are used. Tubular bowl centrifuges are easier to clean and good sludge dewatering as compared to conical plate centrifuge.

=== Chamber bowl or solid bowl centrifuge ===
Both the conical plate centrifuge and chamber bowl centrifuge can be used for liquid/liquid and solid/liquid separation. However, the advantage of conical plate centrifuge over chamber bowl centrifuge is that solid discharge is possible in conical plate. The chamber bowl has a high capacity for solids but there is no solid discharge. Bowl cooling is possible for both conical plate centrifuge and chamber bowl centrifuge. However, cleaning is easier as well as better sludge dewatering in chamber bowl centrifuge as compared to conical plate centrifuge.

== Main process characteristics ==
The following process characteristics are required in a disk stack centrifuge:

=== Disk angle ===
A typical angle of 35 to 50° (with respect to vertical axis) of the disk is used in the centrifuge with 50 to 200 numbers of disks. This in turns provide a centrifugal acceleration G in the range between 5000 and 15000 g.

=== Effect of g-force ===
The efficiency of solid separation can be increased by applying a relatively moderate G-force of 3000 Gs in a centrifuge processing calcium carbonate (with sizes below 8 and 12 micron). This efficiency is reduced at a higher G-force of around 6000 Gs because the high fluid velocities near the wall can flush out the settled coarser particles into the light phase reducing the retention time for particle separation. However this depends on the size of the processed solids.

=== Disk spacing ===
Typically the spacing between adjacent disk ranges from 0.32 to 1 mm. This depends on the application and feed to be processed as well as feed concentration as shown in the examples below.

- Yeast processing: Yeast with 30% by volume of solids requires an open spacing of 1 mm.
- E. coli and lysate: At lower feed solids, a tighter spacing of 0.5 mm is the most suitable.
- Mammalian cell broth: A disk spacing of 0.32 mm can be used at low feed solids with concentration of 3 – 4%.

As a rule of thumb, the ratio of the bowl outer diameter to the bowl height must be approximately equal to 1.

=== Feed solids ===
There are two types of feed solids for this centrifuge:

- Suspended solids

Common for biopharmaceutical application, the feed has 2 to 4% v/v (by bulk volume) for mammalian cells. This may increase to 4 to 6% v/v or even higher in the future due to the increase in solids capacity from the upstream processes such as bioreactors. In contrast, the feed has up to 30% v/v bulk volume for yeast.

- Dissolved solids

The feed may contain dissolved solids consisting of valuable protein product and other soluble contaminants that requires removal in downstream purification.

=== Cone angle for discharge ===
The angle of solid discharge is important as it affects the rate of concentrate being discharged. The steeper the cone angle, the greater the G-force produced to clear the solids off the wall of the cone. Furthermore, a steep cone angle helps in the compaction of the concentrate hence preventing discharge issues, resulting in more concentrate solid being discharged.

=== Discharge frequency ===
For a centrifuge with intermittent discharge mode, determining the discharge frequency is essential to maximize productivity. The time, $t_d$, to fill up the disk centrifuge is given by the expression:

$t_d = {v_s \eta_d \over Q_f \Phi_f}$

Where

$v_s$ is the volume of solid hold-up in L,
$\eta_d$ is the discharge efficiency,
$Q_f$ is the feed rate in L/min,
$\Phi_f$ is the feed volume in L/min.

An initial guess of is implemented otherwise calculated and from calculated $t_d$, frequency discharge can be approximated. By monitoring the turbidity of centrate, further fine-tuning can be made.

=== Liquid discharge ===
In a nozzle disc bowl, centrate (solid output) or effluent liquid can be discharged by centripetal pump or paring pump. This is advantageous in reducing the energy of the discharge stream, allows air contact as well as reduces foaming especially when liquid has dissolved protein.

== Heuristics ==
=== Heuristic methods for designing a process ===
In process design, many of the important decisions are made based on experience and heuristics. There are many factors affecting process design. Furthermore, processes would be modified in accordance to production, market and environmental demands. A heuristic method available to help design separation process (conical plate centrifuge) is called Douglas (1988) methodology.

Douglas methodology uses a three level hierarchical systematic procedure where heuristics can be applied. The three level process designs are:

1. Focuses on process flow diagram that includes the characteristic size calculations.
2. A detailed process design (P&ID) that provides mass and energy flow as well as equipment specifications.
3. Mechanical design (construction of equipment).

Douglas’ method is suitable for modelling a conical plate centrifugal process as it breaks down a complicated design problem into simple piece.

=== Possible heuristics for conical plate centrifuge ===
Modification of a specific design in accordance to the heuristics (rule of thumb) for a particular process is one of the effective methods to be applied. Possible heuristics that can be used when designing certain parts of the conical plate centrifuge are:

Equipment

- Good rigidity is required, which can be achieved by large number of conical discs with appropriate wall thickness.
- The space between discs is at intervals of 0.4 to 0.75 mm, the exact space is determined by the liquid to be processed and its compatibility to the solids to be separated from the liquid.
- For medium rate filtering, discs-type centrifuges are used.
- For slow filtering slurries, sedimenting centrifuges are used.

Nozzles

- The size range of nozzle is between 0.5 mm diameter openings (for small centrifuges) to 3.2 mm diameter openings (for larger centrifuges).
- The quantity of nozzles per centrifuge depends on the size of centrifuges, which is typically ranged from 12 to 24 mm. The quantity of nozzles must be selected so as to avoid solid accumulating between adjacent nozzles, which can build into the disk stack and disturb its clarification effectiveness.
- The minimum allowable nozzle size is at least two times bigger than the diameter of the biggest particle to be discharged.

Feed

- Liquids with small proportion of suspended solids.
- Solid-liquid mixture leaving a three-phase reactor is separated using a conical plate centrifuge. The solid is sent to the solids separation system whereas the liquid is sent to the liquid separation system.

Product

- Low moisture content in the wet cakes.
- Solids are permitted in the mother liquor (sludge).

Material of construction

- For high speed separation and highly corrosive suspension process, high-strength stainless steel (such as duplex and higher-grade duplex) is used for the bowl and accessories construction.
- For liquid that contains highly abrasive fine particulates, areas which are prone to wear and tear need to be protected by tungsten carbide and nickel-based alloys. Sealing using special ceramic material is also needed for process involving liquid with abrasive fines.

== Production of waste stream ==
Conical plate centrifuge produces waste sludge which needs to be treated before it can be disposed. The treatment for sludge is thickening, dewatering, digestion, drying and destruction, which can act as a post treatment to the conical plate centrifugation process. Further elaboration on these post treatment are:

=== Sludge thickening ===
Sludge thickening by gravitational settling and dynamic is used to minimize the volume of sludge. Feed with a content of 0.8% solids, can be thickened to a content of 4% solids, which means a fivefold decrease in sludge volume is obtained. This in return helps optimize the following steps by reducing the size of structure and operating costs.

Sludge thickening using centrifugal force is amongst the most common process used. There are two types of centrifuge designed for sludge thickening and both methods depends on the same solid-liquid separation principal. The first method is "solid bowl centrifuge", a horizontally-arranged helical screw that admits sludge, removes solid in a countercurrent fashion while allowing liquids to pass through. The moving shaft consists of a set of helical scrolls which push the solid waste against the flow of incoming sludge. As solid content starts to build up, it will become too heavy and then drops down to a collection bin. A video illustrates this process.

Centrifuge design depends mostly on solid throughput criteria and solids flux.

=== Sludge dewatering ===
Sludge dewatering can be achieved by electro-osmosis or centrifugation process. Prior to dewatering, the thickened sludge is first conditioned. This is to increase the particle size and break the cohesion between the matter and the water, for better dewatering process.

=== Digestion ===
The objective of digestion is to reduce sludge quantity, increase sludge dryness and stabilization of sludge. Furthermore, it provides valuation in green energy by producing biogas. The condition for digestion depends on the quantity and nature of sludge.

=== Sludge drying ===
Sludge drying is necessary to remove remaining water available due to mechanical limitation during sludge dewatering. The thermal drying process is affected by the specific behaviour (depends on the dryness to be reached) of the sludge.

=== Sludge destruction ===
In sludge destruction, all the organic matter present in the sludge is destroyed and during destruction, vapour and electricity is generated.

== New development ==
High separation efficiency of a centrifuge is the result of the combination of centrifugal force and built in pack plate usually a conical disc plate. Therefore, new development usually emphasize on these two areas.

=== Biodiesel production ===
A new semi-hermetic centrifuge was designed so that the feed pressure entering the system can be as low as possible by keeping the outlets open, which reduces the pressure drop across the separator. The stationary paring disc installed at the outlet also allows the process to be operated at low pressure. Another advantage of this design is it produces low noise level due to the rubber-damped assembly, jacketed frame and an outer bowl.

=== Wastewater treatment ===
Another recent development to the conical plate centrifuge is in sludge dewatering. With a wide range of design variants available to change particular designs to fit different applications, baffles have been fitted at the solid discharge end of the decanter. The bowl becomes almost full of solids rather than having a shallow layer at the bowl periphery and the solid discharge is drier.

=== Oil and gas industry ===
Society of Petroleum Engineer (SPE) has designed a new plate pack with vertical plates made of 360 stainless steel plates held by a plate support sleeve. It is arranged in parallel to the centrifuge axis. An increase in the centrifugal efficiency is obtained based on a computer simulation program ran beforehand. This is proven experimentally in which oil concentration in the effluent has decreased by about 25%. Further improvement of the plate pack may lead to a decrease of oil effluent concentration of more than 40% and seems feasible.
