= Hydroextractor =

Centrifuge for drying textiles

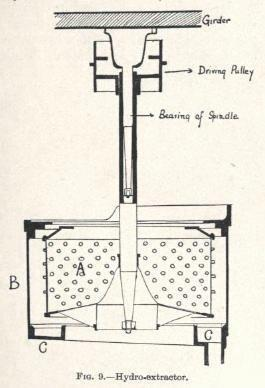
Hydroextractor

Hydroextractors are machines which are used in the textile processing industry. These are mainly centrifuges. The wet material is placed in the extractor, which has a wall of perforated metal, generally stainless steel. The internal drum rotates at high speed, thus throwing out the water contained in it. The use of the hydroextractor significantly reduces the energy required to dry any material. Hydroextractors usually work on centrifugal force creating a high gravitational force, enhancing water extraction. Hence the water is separated and the product is obtained in a dry form.
