= Decanter centrifuge =

Rotating device used for wastewater treatment

In general, a centrifuge is any device that employs a high rotational speed to separate components of different densities. A decanter centrifuge (also known as solid bowl centrifuge) continuously separates solid materials from liquids in the slurry perchance. Decanters are especially well suited to handling continuous-flow slurries with high solid content (40% or higher by volume) that must be separated at a single pass. As such, decanters play an important role in wastewater treatment, and in the chemical, oil, and food processing industries.

== Operating principle ==
The operating principle of a decanter centrifuge is based on separation via buoyancy. Naturally, a component with a higher density would fall to the bottom of a mixture, while the less dense component would be suspended above it. A decanter centrifuge increases the rate of settling through the use of continuous rotation, producing a G-force equivalent to between 1000 and 4000 G's. This reduces the settling time of the components by a large magnitude, whereby mixtures previously having to take hours to settle can be settled in a matter of seconds using a decanter centrifuge. This form of separation enables more rapid and controllable results.

=== How does it work ===
The feed product is pumped into the decanter centrifuge through the inlet. Feed goes into a horizontal bowl, which rotates. The bowl is composed of a cylindrical part and a conical part. The separation takes place in the cylindrical part of the bowl. The fast rotation generates centrifugal forces up to 4000 x g. Under these forces, the solid particles with higher density are collected and compacted on the wall of the bowl. A scroll (also screw or screw conveyor) rotates inside the bowl at a slightly different speed. This speed difference is called the differential speed. This way the scroll is transporting the settled particles along the cylindrical part of the bowl and up to the end conical part of the bowl. At the smallest end of the conical part of the bowl, the dewatered solids leave the bowl via discharge opening. The clarified liquid leaves through a paring disc (internal centripetal pump).

=== 3-phase separation with a decanter ===
With a 3 phase decanter centrifuge, it is possible to separate 3 phases from each other in one process step only. For example, two liquids which cannot be mixed because of different densities (e.g. oil and water) are separated from a solids phase. The heavy liquid (water) collects in the middle between the oil and the solids layer. Thus the two liquids separated from each other can be drawn off from the decanter. The solids are transported via the scroll to the discharge openings as it happens also in 2-phase separation.

Typical applications of 3-phase separation are the production of edible oils such as olive oil, oil sludge processing, the production of biodiesel etc.

== Parameters and influencing factors of the separation ==
=== Feed, throughput and residence time ===
Through the feed, the separation medium to be processed can be input into the centre of the infeed chamber of the scroll, where it is accelerated. The throughput will have an influence on the residence time.

=== Acceleration ===
The separation medium reaches its maximum speed in the decanter bowl, causing the solids to settle on the bowl inner diameter. A characteristic feature of the bowl is its cylindrical/conical shape.

=== Differential speed ===
There is a differential speed between the decanter bowl and the scroll, which is created by a gear unit on the industrial decanter centrifuges. The differential speed determines the quality of the discharged solids in terms of dryness or dewatering.

=== Filling volume / weir discs or overflow weir ===
The clarified liquid flows to the cylindrical end of the bowl in the decanter centrifuge. From tjhere it runs out through openings in the bowl cover. These openings contain precisely adjustable weir discs/weir plates by means of which the pond depth in the bowl can be set. The weir discs determine the filling volume of the bowl.

== Range of applications ==
The main application of decanter centrifuges is to separate large amounts of solids from liquids on a continuous basis. They are also used to wash and dry various solids in industry, such as polystyrene beads, clarify liquids and concentrate solids.

Industries with corresponding examples that use decanter centrifuges
| Industry | Examples |
|---|---|
| Food processing | Edible animal fat; Animal protein; Protein recovery; Plant oils such as olive oil and vegetable oil; Wine (clarification); Fruit, berries and vegetable juice; Soy protein; Dairy (recovery of lactose, whey fines and cheese fines, casein fractionation); Coffee and tea; Pectin |
| Petrochemical/oil | Refining; Dewatering; Oil well drilling; Lubricating oil additives; Waste oil stream recycling |
| Waste recycling | Municipal wastewater; Cleaning of wash water |
| Fish processing | Fish meal; Fish oil |
| Chemical | Herbal medicines; Chemical extraction; Ethanol |
| Mineral processing | Bentonite and titanium dioxide manufacturers; Kaolin clay and calcium carbonate processing |
| Organic chemical industry | Organic intermediate and end products |
| Polymer industry | Thermoplastics for example PVC, synthetic rubber and fibres |
| Inorganic chemical industry | Bleaching agents; Acids; Silica products; Fertilisers |
| Nuclear Fuel Processing | Thorium-234 and Uranium isotopes, from process waste streams., |

== Advantages and limitations over competitive processes ==
Generally the decanter centrifuge has more advantages than disadvantages; however, there are some limitations when compared to other processes.

Advantages:

- Decanter centrifuges have a clean appearance and have little to no odour problems.
- Decanter centrifuges are available on a pilot scale for research and development.
- Not only is the device easy to install and fast at starting up and shutting down but also only requires a small area for operation compared to other competitive processes.
- The decanter centrifuge is versatile as different lengths of the cylindrical bowl section and the cone angle can be selected for different applications. Also, the system can be pre-programmed with various design curves to predict the sludge type, while some competitive processes, such as a belt filter press, cannot change the belt type to operate for different sludge types. Its versatility allows the machine to have various functions such as operating for thickening or dewatering.
- The machine can operate with a higher throughput capacity than smaller machines. This also reduces the number of units required.
- The device is simple to optimise and operate as it has few major variables and reliable feedback information.
- The decanter centrifuge has reduced labour costs compared to other processes, as it requires low continuous maintenance and operator attention.
- Compared to some competitive process such as the belt filter process, the decanter centrifuge has more process flexibility and higher levels of performance.

Limitations:

- The decanter centrifuge cannot separate biological solids with very small density differences, such as cells and viruses. A competitive process that is capable of separating these difficult-to-separate solids is the tubular-bowl centrifuge.
- The machine can be very noisy and can cause vibration.
- The device has a high-energy consumption due to high G-forces.
- The decanter centrifuge has high equipment capital costs. Hard surfacing and abrasion protection materials are required for the scroll to reduce wear and therefore reduce the maintenance of the scroll wear.

== Designs available ==
The main types of decanter centrifuges are the vertical orientation, horizontal orientation and conveyor/scroll.

In vertical decanter centrifuges, the rotating assembly is mounted vertically with its weight supported by a single bearing at the bottom or suspended from the top. The gearbox and bowl are suspended from the drive head, which is connected to the frame. The vertical decanter allows for high temperature and/or high-pressure operation due to the orientation and the rotational seals provided at one end. However, this makes the device more expensive than the horizontal decanter centrifuge, which is non-pressurised and open. The advantage of the vertical machine over the horizontal machine is that the noise emitted during production is much lower due to less vibration.

In horizontal decanter centrifuges, as shown in figure 1, the rotating assembly is mounted horizontally with bearings on each end to a rigid frame, which provides a good sealing surface for high-pressure applications. The feed enters through one end of the bearings, while the gearbox is attached to the other end and is operated below the critical speed. Capacities range up to 40,000 pounds (18,000 kg) of solids per hour with liquid feed rates of up to 300 US gallons (1.1 m^{3}) per minute. The horizontal machine is arranged in a way that slurry can be introduced at the centre of a rotating horizontal cylindrical bowl. The scroll discharge screw forces the solids to one end of the bowl as it is collected on the walls. This orientation is the most common design implemented in the industry.

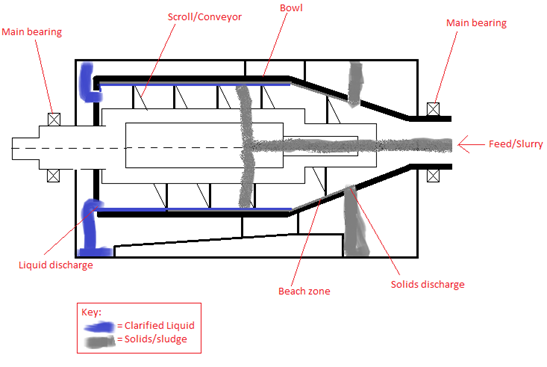
Figure 1. A schematic diagram of a Horizontal Decanter Centrifuge

In conveyor decanter centrifuges the conveyor or scroll fits inside a rotating bowl and carries the solids settled against the wall, pushing them across a beach towards the underflow where the solids discharge. The conveyor allows for an increase in separation efficiency and feed capacity.

== Decanter centrifuges process characteristics ==
The separation process in a decanter centrifuge relies on a few process characteristics such as centrifugal force or G-force, sedimentation rate and separating factor, differential speed between the conveyor and bowl, and clarity of the liquid discharge.

Decanter centrifuges require a centrifugal force for the separation of the solids from the liquid. This characteristic is dependent on the radius of the centrifuge and its angular rotational speed. A decanter centrifuge applies a force equivalent to several thousand G's, which reduces the settling time of the particles. It is also favoured to maintain a large G-force, which will result in an improved separation.

The rate at which sedimentation occurs is an important characteristic of the decanter centrifuge separation process. The sedimentation rate is influenced by the particle size, the shapes of the particles, their density differential between solid and liquid and the viscosity of the liquid. This process characteristic can be improved by utilizing flocculating agents. The sedimentation rate is also dependent on the separating factor of the decanter centrifuge, which is related to the centrifugal force.

In a screw decanter the exterior bowl and the scroll conveyor rotate at different high speeds. This differential speed between the two is accountable for the sedimentation throughout the decanter centrifuge cylinder. A high differential speed results in a smaller residence time of the cake settlement, so it is necessary to keep the cake thickness to a minimum to avoid impairing the discharge quality. Keeping the cake thickness to a minimum also aids in the improvement of the cake dewatering process. For this reason, it is necessary to obtain an optimal differential speed to balance the cake thickness and quality.

The characteristic above all affects the clarity of the liquid output which is dependent on the volumetric throughout rate, where a higher flow rate will result in a poor liquid clarity. Another characteristic that influences the clarity of the liquid output is the differential speed. A low differential speed results in a better clarity, therefore, aiding in the separation process. The G-Force also plays a role in the clarity of the liquid discharge. Higher G-force results in an increase in the separation of the solid particles from the liquid and yields a better clarity.

== Design heuristics ==
Design heuristics are methods based on experience which serve the purpose of reducing the need for calculations with regards to equipment sizing, operating parameters or performance.

One of the important design heuristics to be considered when employing decanter centrifuges is the scale of the process. Decanter centrifuges should ideally be used in large scale processes. This is to optimise economic value since smaller scale processes do not necessarily require such costly equipment to attain the desired product.

Another design heuristic to be considered is the length to diameter ratio of the decanter centrifuge. A length to diameter ratio of 2, 3 and 4 are commonly used. Decanter centrifuges with the same diameter but the longer length would have a higher capacity for conveying solids and attain a larger suspension volume, which would enhance the settling out of fine solids.

The beach angle at the conical section of a decanter centrifuge is a design heuristic, which must also be taken into consideration. The slippage force acting on solids in the direction of the liquid pool increases by a large magnitude when solids exit the pool onto the beach. A decanter centrifuge possessing a small cone angle is able to produce a lower slippage force compared to a large cone angle. A low cone angle is beneficial when solids do not compact properly and possess a soft texture. Additionally, low cone angles result in a lower wear rate on the scroll and are beneficial when being used with very compact solids requiring a large magnitude of torque to move.

The magnitude of centrifugal force being used must also be considered. Centrifugal force aids with dewatering but hinders the transport of cake in the dry beach. Hence, a tradeoff exists between cake conveyance and cake dewatering. A balance between the two is necessary for setting the pool and G-force for a particular application. Additionally, a larger centrifuge will produce better separation than a smaller centrifuge with the same bowl speed as a greater G-force would be produced.

In the cylindrical section of the decanter centrifuge, the pool should ideally be shallow in order to maximise G-force for separation. Alternatively, a deeper pool is advantageous when the cake layer is too thick and the finer particles entrain into the fast liquid stream since a thicker buffer liquid layer is present to help settle suspended solids. The compromise between cake dryness and clarity of centrate is to be considered. The reason behind this trade-off is that in losing fine solids to centrate, the cake with bigger particles is able to dewater more effectively which results in a drier cake. Optimal pool for a particular application should be identified through the conduction of tests.

Another important heuristic is the differential speed, which controls cake transport. A high differential speed would give rise to a high solids throughput. A high differential speed also reduces cake residence time.

== Post-treatment systems ==
The production of a waste stream is small in comparison to the overall process output; however can still pose a number of significant problems. Firstly, the volume of waste in the process reduces the available volume to be used for the process. Direct disposal into the environment of especially oil wastes can be detrimental to the surroundings if a treatment is not applied. The post-treatment system applied to the waste product should depend on the specific treated product required. The objectives of post-treatment can range from achieving a product that can be safely disposed, recycled into the refining process or requires an adequate water phase to be re-used in the process.

The objectives of post-treatment vary between different industries where in order to perform an efficient and economical process; the decanter centrifuge must be tailored to the task at hand. In the food manufacturing industry, decanter centrifuges are utilised in oil extraction machines. An oil extraction machine can process up to fifteen metric tonnes per hour of organic wastes and are found either within the process plant or outdoors if designed for the climate. The waste material enters the inlet chute and is softened into a sludge which is then steam heated. This mixture then enters a three-phase decanter centrifuge, also known as a tricanter centrifuge.

A tricanter centrifuge operates on a similar principle to decanter centrifuges but instead separates three phases, consisting of a suspended solids phase and two immiscible liquids. Sedimentation of the suspended solids occurs as normal where they accumulate on the wall of the bowl and are conveyed out of the centrifuge. The two liquid phases are separated using a dual discharge system where the lighter liquid phase such as oil, is separated over a ring dam via gravity, and water, which is commonly the heavier liquid phase, is discharged using a stationary impeller under pressure. Each of the three components, solid, oil and water, are distributed to different storage tanks.

There are numerous manufacturers specialising in mechanical separation technology that have adopted these new designs into industry standard equipment. This advanced technology has allowed decanter centrifuges to operate up to 250 cubic metres per hour and has developed numerous designs such as the Z8E decanter, known as the world's largest decanter centrifuge with an adjustable impeller, which supplies a torque of 24,000 newton metres. Other designs can reduce power consumption by up to thirty percent due to a large slurry discharge, and are best utilised in the water treatment industry.

== New development ==
The rapid development of the decanter centrifuge over the 20th century saw it expand into a vast range of over 100 industrial applications. Further development since then has seen the refinement of machine design and control methods, improving its overall performance, which allows the system to respond quickly to varying feed conditions. The newest development in decanter centrifuge technology aims to achieve enhanced control of the separation process occurring inside the decanter. The way in which manufacturers aim to address this is by utilising variable mechanical devices in the rotating part of the decanter centrifuge. To control the separation process, the operational parameters should be transferred from the rotating part to the stationary part of the decanter whilst also constantly controlling and maintaining the mechanical device inside the process region. This can be achieved using hydraulic and electronic transfer systems. A hydraulic drive motor is easily able to access the rotating area of the decanter centrifuge.

Another area of development in recent years is the implementation of Functional Safety measures, aiming at providing a better and more safe working environment. Functional Safety measures like SIL-2 certified vibration monitoring protects both personnel and machinery by facilitating a safety shutdown before e.g. vibrations get to a dangerous level and other safety measures.

== Sources ==
- Green, Don W; Perry, Robert H, eds. (2008). Perry's Chemical Engineers' Handbook (8th ed.). McGraw-Hill Education. ISBN 978-0-07-142294-9.
- Harrison, Roger G.; Todd, Paul W.; Rudge, Scott R.; Petrides, Demetri P. (2015). Bioseparations Science and Engineering. doi:10.1093/oso/9780195391817.001.0001. ISBN 978-0-19-539181-7.
- Records, Alan; Sutherland, Ken (2001). Decanter Centrifuge Handbook. doi:10.1016/B978-1-856173-69-8.X5000-X. ISBN 978-1-85617-369-8.
