= Peeler centrifuge =

The peeler centrifuge is a device that performs by rotating filtration basket in an axis. A centrifuge follows on the principle of centrifugal force to separate solids from liquids by density difference. High rotation speed provides high centrifugal force that allows the suspended solid in feed to settle on the inner surface of basket. There are three kinds of centrifuge, horizontal, vertical peeler centrifuge and siphon peeler centrifuge. These classes of instrument apply to various areas such as fertilisers, pharmaceutical, plastics and food including artificial sweetener and modified starch.

== General principles ==
=== Operation ===
Peeler centrifuge operates on the principle of centrifugal force to separate solids from liquids by density difference. And high rotation speed provides high centrifugal force that allows the suspended solid in feed to settle on the inner surface of drum, also washing and washing processes at the same rotational speed and in same centrifuge vessel.
Peeler centrifuges are batch and continuous centrifuge processes, and this process may be used to achieve maximum removal of solid from liquid that may be required to be as pure as possible and can not be easily separated by differences their densities.

== Types ==
=== Horizontal peeler ===
The horizontal peeler centrifuge is one of oldest peeler centrifuge designs. The first horizontal peeler centrifuge was manufactured by Buffaud et Robatel (Lyon, FRANCE) in 1905 for synthetic ammonia production at plants in Europe, Russia, Japan, and the USA.
The horizontal peeler centrifuge has a general structure (refer to section 1.1) with horizontal rotating basket, which sits inside of external casing. The door of drum can be opened fully and contains feed; wash, feed control and solids discharge components. Modern machines are supported by cantilever for ease of access to inside of drum and components for purpose of maintenance. The unit required rugged structure, as it needs to handle high speeds of rotation and feeds, discharging capability.
The horizontal arrangement of rotating drum provides several advantages (refer to section 6.1) over other centrifuge systems, such as vertical basket centrifuge.

=== Vertical peeler ===
The vertical peeler (also known as vertical basket peeler) is a centrifuge system that has the same basic operating principles as the horizontal peeler centrifuge. The only difference other than arrangement, is that the scrapped off solids layers are not removed by chute of peeler, but it is discharged through the discharge chute at the bottom of centrifuge vessel.
Because it does not utilise peeler action to remove solid layers, the centrifuge system must be decelerated so that the solid product can be discharged by gravity without centrifugal force that prevents solids to be dropped to discharge chute.

=== Siphon peeler ===
The siphon peeler centrifuge is another peeler centrifuge design developed by Krauss-Maffei in the 1970s. Rather than only centrifugal pressure based filtration, siphon peeler centrifuge contains perforate units both horizontally and vertically.
Siphon peeler centrifuge has similar structure to Krauss-Maffei horizontal peeler centrifuge, except instead of inner drum wall with pores, siphon peeler centrifuge has solid inner drum wall where the liquid filtered through solid cake and filter medium will flow along the wall axially and through siphon pipe into separate chamber unlike horizontal peeler centrifuge.
This solid wall and instant removal of filtered liquid advantage this design by providing large pressure difference across the solid cake and filter medium, so does strong driving force, which increases filtration efficiency.

== Range of Applications ==
=== Horizontal peeler ===
Generally peeler centrifuges are used to separate solids, usually fine particles from suspension liquid feed mixtures. Horizontal peeler centrifuges are widely used design in separation processes in:

- Bulk chemicals such as petrochemical intermediates, fertilisers, chlorides, sulfates and calcium.
- Fine chemicals: aluminium fluoride, amino acids, bleaching agents, surfactants, pesticides, catalyst and dyestuffs.
- Pharmaceuticals
- Plastics
- Foods including artificial sweeteners, caffeine and modified starches.

=== Vertical peeler ===
Vertical peeler centrifuge applications are similar to the horizontal peeler centrifuge. The following areas are where vertical centrifuge is mainly used for processes (refer to section 3.1).

=== Siphon peeler ===
Siphon peeler centrifuge has similar applications to the horizontal peeler centrifuge (refer to section 3.1) and is very flexible in use. It is used for starch, herbicides or fine chemicals.

== Main process characteristics ==
=== Main process of centrifuge ===
There are several steps in peeler centrifuge process:

- Feeding

The suspension is introduced to the rotating centrifuge basket via the feed distributor to prevent from spilling over the basket rim also to ensure the even cake level. The level of the feed is monitored and regulated by a feed controller, and normally the basket is filled up to 75-80% of the basket rim height. The feed step is complete when the filter cake has reached the desired level.

- Filtration

Primary filtration for liquid phase of the feed through the filter medium attached in the basket is proceeding until the liquid has submerged into the filter cake and drained outside the rotating basket. The solid phase is held on the filter medium and become sediment, which forms secondary filter giving extra efficiency.

- Washing

After the filtration step, washing liquid is introduced through feed distributor and separate spray bar. Under the effect of the centrifugal force, the washing liquid submerged into cake and filter. Washing can be carried out at the same or higher speed than the feeding step.

- Dry spinning

The fluid in filter cake is drained by accelerating basket to maximum allowable speed and kept constant. The residual cake moisture decreases over time under the constant centrifugal force and ends when it reaches the desired residual humidity.

- Discharging the solids/filter cake

The filter cake is removed from the basket by a pivoting peeling device equipped with a broad peeling knife and scraping until a thin layer of filter cake is retained to protect the filter medium. The scraped layers of product are discharged through an inclined chute or screw conveyor.

- Cleaning centrifuge

Cleaning of the interior of the centrifuge required after every, or several cycles to clear the solids out of holes in basket and preserve the efficiency of filtration. The inside of the centrifuge with all built in devices can be cleaned automatically with an integrated CIP (cleaning in place system) without the need to open the centrifuge.

=== Operational parameters ===
The manufacturer can vary the operational parameters of the peeler centrifuge for specific applications. The parameters in this section are from several different peeler manufacturers.

==== Centrifugal force ====
GMP-Compatible HZ peeler Centrifuge (HZ-Phll): 1060-2030G
Mitsubishi/KM Siphon peeler Centrifuge (HZ-Si): 200-1895G

==== Rotational speed ====
Horizontal peeler Centrifuges (H630P-H1250P): 1180-2400rpm
Vertical peeler Centrifuges (V 800 – 1600 BG): 575-1000rpm
Mitsubishi/KM Siphon peeler Centrifuge (HZ-Si): 950-3000rpm

==== Particle size ====
Horizontal Peeler Centrifuge: 2-500 μm
Horizontal discontinuous separation Peeler Centrifuge: 2 μm-10mm

==== Capacity ====
Horizontal peeler centrifuges (H630P-H1250P): 42-303L
GMP-Compatible HZ peeler Centrifuge(HZ-Phll): 11-333L
Vertical peeler centrifuges (V 800 – 1600 BG): 160-1250L
Mitsubishi/KM Siphon peeler Centrifuge(HZ-Si): 11-875L

== Processes and Equipment Design ==
=== Design Heuristics ===
==== Horizontal discontinuous separation Peeler Centrifuge ====
First of all, the suspension is filled into the batch at fixed or variable speed by gravity or pump. Then the feed is controlled by filling valve and the basket is observed by filling level controller. Following step is washing solids. Using a variety of fluids, cake is washed and become intensive. After the washing step, a hydraulically powered scraper is used for removal of cake.

==== Vertical peeler centrifuge ====
At first, the suspension is filled into the vertical basket at adjusted speed. The effect of the centrifugal force make the solid particle settles on the filter fabric on the basket shell. Depending on the product, intermediate centrifuging is required and it interrupts the filling process. Also it will be repeated several times by the filtration reaction of the product. The solids in the basket are washed at the same or higher speed than the filling process after suspension has been centrifuged. And hydro-extraction stage is followed. Depending on the solids and fluids parameters, the height of the filter cake and, naturally, the centrifugal force acting upon the fluid to be separated. After the extraction, the filter cake discharged from the basket by means of a short peeling knife.

=== Design Equation ===
Centrifugal Acceleration

$$\text{a} =  \frac{V_\theta^2}{r}$$
(Equation 1)

where

$\textstyle V_\theta^2$ is the tangential velocity at the given point on the curve trajectory
$\textstyle r$ is the radius of curvature at the point.
Equation 1 depicts the kinematic relationship of centrifugal force required to sustain the movement of mass along a curve trajectory. The force acts perpendicularly to the direction of motion and is directed radially inward.

Solid body rotation

When body of fluid rotates in a solid-body mode, the tangential or circumferential velocity is linearly proportional to radius.
$$V_\theta =  \Omega^2 r$$
(Equation 2)

where

$\textstyle \Omega$ is the angular speed of the rotating frame
$\textstyle r$ is the radius from the axis of rotation.
Equation 2 shows linear relationship of radius and circumferential velocity, $\textstyle V_\theta$.

Fluid Viscosity and Inertia

$$\delta = \sqrt{\frac{\mu / \rho}{\Omega}}$$
(Equation 3)

where

$\textstyle \mu / \rho$ is the kinematic viscosity of the liquid and Ω is the angular speed of the rotating frame
$\textstyle \delta$ is the thickness of the layers called ‘Ekman layers’. This layer is responsible for transfer of angular momentum between the rotating surfaces to fluid during acceleration and deceleration.
Equation 3 shows the dynamic effect of viscosity of liquid slurry in sedimenting centrifuge is confined in very think fluid layers.

Cake dryness

Dewatering is important step for centrifuge filtration to ensure the quality of solid output. The dryness can be measured by cake porosity,
$$\epsilon = 1 - \frac{\omega_s}{V_s \rho_c}$$
(Equation 4)

where

$\textstyle \omega_s$ is the mass of solid
$\textstyle V_s$ is the cake volume
$\textstyle \rho_c$ is the cake solid density.

From porosity, the content of moisture in the wet cake is measured by looking at saturation, S.
$$S = ( \frac{1 - W}{W} ) ( \frac{1 - \epsilon}{\epsilon} ) ( \frac{\rho_s}{\rho_L} )$$
(Equation 5)

where

$\textstyle W$ is the weight of solid fraction
$\textstyle \rho_L$ is the liquid density.
Equation 5 describes when saturation is less than 1, for unsaturated solid cake.
When the solid cake is saturated, S=1 , the cake porosity can be determined by Equation 6 below
$$\epsilon = ( 1 + \frac{\rho_L}{\rho_s} \frac{W}{1 - W} )^{-1}$$
(Equation 6)

Total solid recovery

In clarification, the total solids recovered in the solid cake measure the clarity of the effluent indirectly. This indirect relationship is shown in Equation 7,
$$rec =  \frac{m_c W_c}{m_f W_f}$$
(Equation 7)

where

subscript c and f denote, the cake and feed respectively.
$\textstyle m$ denotes the bulk mass flow rate.

Critical Speed

The critical speed is important factor to consider design. Critical speed is the speed of rotation at which the frequency of rotation matches the natural frequency. At this speed, any vibration caused by slight unbalance in the rotor is strongly reinforced, which may results high stresses or even failure of equipment.

== Advantages and limitations ==
=== Advantages ===
==== Horizontal Peeler Centrifuge ====
The horizontal peeler centrifuge is known for its many advantages from its horizontal rotation arrangement of the main drum. By arranging the axis horizontally, advantages in washing capability, uniform solid size distribution for better solid output quality. The feeding action within centrifuge is effective over large inner surface of drum as the feeds are fed perpendicularly to gravity and centrifugal force spreads out the solids evenly.
Also the door of centrifuge system that can be fully opened which allows easy access to inside of rotating drum. This also means the operator can get access to internal components including filter cloth which required replacement.
And its high discharge speed reduces time taken to accelerate and braking for rotation for high capacity, so does power consumption, wear and tear. This short cycle time is particularly beneficial for short cycle, fast-filtering requirements for certain processes. This means horizontal peeler centrifuge provides higher centrifugal forces than vertical peeler, and increases performances and flexibility.
Due to continuous discharge of filtered liquid through perforated inner surface of rotating basket, the pressure drop, main driving force of filtration is increased across the solid cake and filter medium, as a result, the filtration rate can be boosted.
Moreover, high rotational speed results high rotational force which allows lowering residual cake moisture effectively, so does the washing liquid and washing results. Because of effective washing, drying processes that yield high purity of output, it is widely used in ultra-clean material processes.

Mitsubishi Peeler Centrifuge

The Mitsubishi Peeler Centrifuge has a liquid-tight construction, which is suitable for treating solvents and dangerous liquids. Over 1000G of Centrifugal force make the cake have low moisture. The cake-raking knife located above the feed liquid piping prevents that liquid drips directly onto the cake outlet, thereby recovering contamination-free solids. Fully opened front door makes filter cloth replacement and internal flushing easy.
Siphonage enlarges the effect of centrifugal filtration and siphon chamber is used for backwashing to avoid the loading of filter cloth. To ensure non-vibration filtration, filtering speed can be controlled. Once high G and siphon effect are combined, powerful dewatering, greatly saving on energy are possible at the drying stage. Fast cake raking minimizes loss of time and driving power as well. And siphon mechanism makes the cleaning operation various and cleaning time and liquid are saved.

==== Horizontal discontinuous separation Peeler Centrifuge ====
The horizontal peeler centrifuge can be used for discontinuous separation process. This discontinuous process can be automated and operate automatically, ensure constant basket speed.

==== Vertical Peeler Centrifuge ====
Vertical peeler centrifuge is more cost efficient compared to horizontal Krauss-Maffei peeler centrifuge due to its compact design. The continuous operation of centrifuge allows all process steps are carried out simultaneously, increases the overall throughput.

==== Siphon peeler centrifuge ====
Siphon peeler has similar configuration to Krauss-Maffei’s simple horizontal centrifuge. However the use of solid inner drum wall instead of perforated basket wall allows increasing the pressure drop for filtration. Instantly removed liquid which flows into rear chamber through siphon pipe, creates vacuum underneath the filter medium. This increased pressure gradient means high driving force for filtration, so does much efficient filtration.
Moreover filtrate flows along the solid wall, the siphon basket provide skimming stage to enhance the purity of filtrate. The siphon basket that has larger radius than filter cloth reduces the pressure behind the cloth to the vapour pressure of the filtrate liquid to overcome the wet layer of liquid over the surface of solid cake by capillary reaction, which reduces the filtration rate. This rotational siphon makes many advantages possible, such as accuracy of control of the filtration rate, batch washing for each cycle renews the heel and maintain the permeability, also extended heel life.

=== Limitations ===
==== Horizontal peeler centrifuge ====
Despite many advantages of the horizontal peeler centrifuge, there are many operational limitations associated with the characteristics of peeler centrifuge, which may need to be developed, and/or other competitive processes can replace for the peeler centrifuge with its limitations.
In operation, the peeler is kept away from the innermost surface of the separation drum as sharp peeler may damage the surface of the filter medium or be damaged by abrasion, which may require replacement. This means the solid cake on wall cannot be completely removed by peelers as it is recommended to leave thin layer of solid cakes. Also despite this layer of solid acting as sub filtration layer provides extra separation step, however this also could mean the filtration time may be lengthened as there is another layer for liquid has to pass.
Cost wise, the peeler centrifuge is not cost efficient compared to comparable size of vertical centrifuge due to high capital cost. In comparison over other competitive separation processes (refer to section 7)

==== Vertical peeler centrifuge ====
For collecting output solid that has been scraped off by peeler during the process, can only be manually retrieved by slowing down the process. The solids are collected at the bottom of basket and rotation has to be stopped or slowed down to get control over the discharge. This extends the batch processing time and consequently the filtration rate.
Also despite the vertical peeler’s low cost due to compact design, the throughput of vertical centrifuge is restricted compared to other peeler or centrifuge systems. With consideration of low batch throughput rate, overall performance in comparison to other processes, (comparison)

==== Siphon peeler centrifuge ====
The siphon peeler has also similar limitations to Krauss-Maffei horizontal peeler centrifuge as siphon peeler centrifuge is based on horizontal peeler centrifuge except the siphon basket in design. The limitations are careful peeler action control to prevent possible filtration media damage from abrasion, high capital costs and large space requirement due to horizontal arrangement.
Moreover, as siphon peeler centrifuge utilises not only centrifugal forces but also pressure difference as filtration driving force, sometimes overpressure in process housing. The high pressure difference, the high pressure above solid cake inside of basket, and nearly vacuum condition across the solid cake and filter medium, the installation procedure becomes more complex and siphon peeler system has not been utilised widely.

== Competitive processes ==
=== Sedimentation Centrifuge ===
==== Tubular bowl ====
Tubular bowl centrifuge is widely used for nano-scale particles separation and is one of old design of centrifuge processes. Nanoparticles are separated from a suspension using this process because very high G value i.e. high rotation speed ensures reasonable throughputs are produced.
Because of its ability to separate nano-scale particles with mean size below 1 μm, this process is widely used in pharmaceutical and biotechnology applications. The demand for fine particles that exhibit a defined particle size distribution increases steadily in such areas.

Over many advantages, the manual scrapping, dismantling of deposited solid bed is limitation of this process.

==== Chamber bowl ====
Chamber bowl is another competitive process due to its ability to process feed with low solid contents also effective classification of solids. Chamber bowl separators are solid bowl centrifuges with cylindrical inserts with increasing in diameter to form multiple chambers. They are used to separate solids in low contents from liquid and long retention time in the centrifuge makes the separated solids very compact state.
The chamber bowl centrifuge has maximum solids holding capacity of 0.064m^3 and is commonly used to clarifying fruit juice and beer. This separation processes usually incorporate centripetal pump at effluent discharge point to minimise foaming and contact with air.
Due to its ability to operate in discontinuous mode, chamber bowl is one of suitable option for batch processing. Also the classification of solids separated from feed is effective with chamber bowl as increasing in centrifugal force exerting on the slurry as it pass from middle chamber towards out.
In terms of maintenance, unlike peeler centrifuge designs, the machine has to shut down completely to remove chambers from casing. Also this requires manual scraping, removal of deposited solids on the chamber wall.

==== Decanter centrifuge ====
Decanter centrifuge is usually available in two arrangements, vertical and horizontal. This centrifuge is suitable for treating suspension including very high content of solids(40-60%) which makes this process much more applicable in many applications than peeler centrifuge. Decanter centrifuge is widely used also because of its ability to separate solids from liquid mixtures, also its decanting action can used to separate two immiscible liquids in feed with necessary baffles and outlets while continuously discharging bulky sludge.
However its limitation on dewatering makes peeler centrifuge with effective dewatering and high quality of solid output competitive. This design has recent challenge that is to get throughput as dry as possible.

=== Moving bed filters ===
==== Pusher centrifuge ====
Pusher centrifuge consists of cylindrical basket that is fixed to a hollow shaft and plate on the basket bottom mounted on the rod. This pusher rod moves along axial directions so that pushing action can be created at the bottom of basket. The feed is fed into system and the solid cake forms along the wall. This cake ring formed is then pushed back towards discharged by pushing motion of pusher plate.
Unlike peeler centrifuges, the pusher centrifuge does get influenced by feed condition which need to be kept as constant as possible due to continuous product transport by pushing motion. However pusher centrifuge is one of the most competitive processes to peeler centrifuges due to its effective washing and dewatering of any continuous centrifuge processes. The pusher centrifuge performance is usually in function of crystal size as well as shape; meaning pusher is much effective for larger particle separation (generally around 150 μm).
Its performance is function of the crystal size and shape. The increased crystal size decreases the surface area per unit mass, and there are fewer surfaces. It enables moisture not to bind to the surface, providing a drier cake. In addition this centrifuge has very effective process of washing.

=== Hydrocyclones ===
The Hydrocyclone is used for separation of solid from a liquid or two immiscible liquids feed. Hydrocyclones are centrifugal separators that consist of a vertical cylinder with a conical bottom. The feed is entering in through tangential entry nozzle, and rotational movement imparted to feed, so does giving rise to centrifugal force.
Hydrocyclones are relatively inexpensive and also simple in operation. However there are capacity limitations, as hydrocyclone with large diameter will not generate sufficient centrifugal force for separation. Due to solve this limit, unlike the peeler centrifuge, hydrocyclones are sometimes used in series arrangement to achieve multiple separation stages.
The Hydrocyclone is one of the well-studied designs due to its low cost, simplicity and other advantages.

=== Horizontal Peeler and Inverting Filtering Centrifuge ===
A complete discharge of product can be guaranteed by pneumatic residual heel removal. A fully automated system enables that all surfaces in the separation process area are thoroughly cleaned.
Throughput solids leave through chute suited to products. Therefore the products can be discharged easily from centrifuges and slide easily without sticking to the chute. Solids are allowed to leave from centrifuges via screw conveyor. The screw conveyor facilitates the removal of solids having tendency of not being discharged via chute because of its sticky property.
Discharging throughput solids are conducted via a hydraulic peeler knife, which is designed based on the size of centrifuges such as a full size peeler or a pivot and dip peeler.
