= Sludge dewatering =

Wastewater treatment process

Sludge dewatering refers to the physical processes used to reduce the moisture content of sludge, a by-product of wastewater treatment that is either liquid or semi-solid, often malodorous, and typically contains 0.25% to 12% solids by weight depending on the treatment applied. By reducing the water content, the solid fraction becomes more concentrated, resulting in a denser sludge. In municipal treatment plants, the water content of sludge, which may initially be up to 99%, can be reduced to around 20-40% after dewatering, making transportation and disposal significantly easier. Dewatered sludge also becomes less prone to decomposition and odor.

The practice of drying sludge in sludge lagoons began in the late 19th century. By the 1920s, sludge drying beds and filter presses were widely used for water removal. The emergence of activated sludge with distinct characteristics in this period required the development of new systems. By the late 1930s, vacuum filters came into use, followed by belt filter presses and centrifuge techniques in the 1960s.

== Sludge Dewatering Methods ==
=== 1. Natural Dewatering Methods ===
- Sludge drying beds
- Sludge sedimentation

=== 2. Mechanical Dewatering Methods ===
- Vacuum filtration
- Belt press
- Filter press
- Decanter (Centrifuge)

The selection of a dewatering method depends on factors such as sludge type, desired end-product characteristics, and required land area. Techniques such as evaporation, seepage, and mechanical separation are used, often supported by conditioning chemicals.

== Natural Dewatering Methods ==
=== Sludge Drying Beds ===
Common in arid regions, drying beds consist of a porous filter medium made of layered sand and gravel over drainage pipes. The particle size increases from top to bottom to facilitate filtration.

Due to ease of operation and low cost, they are particularly used for aerobically stabilized sludge. Sludge is spread in 20-30 cm thick layers and left to dry. Water drains through the sand-gravel layers and is discharged via pipes with at least a 1% gradient. Evaporation further increases solids content. A 10-15 day drying period can yield sludge with 40% solids under optimal conditions. Manual removal may also require replenishing sand.

=== Sludge Lagoons ===
In this method, stabilized sludge with minimal odor is pumped into shallow lagoons, where water is removed by evaporation and settling. Periodically, the settled sludge is removed, and clarified water is sent back to the treatment plant. Deeper lagoons with raw sludge can lead to odor problems, whereas shallow lagoons used with digested sludge do not.

Depending on sludge depth and climate, drying times vary, but typically 3-4 weeks suffice to reach 20-40% solids content. Lagoon cleaning is generally infrequent, and large-scale sludge removal is preferred over frequent small removals. Although economical and low in energy use, disadvantages include large land requirements, odor issues, and risk of groundwater contamination.

== Mechanical Dewatering Methods ==
=== Vacuum Filtration ===
First used in England in 1872, this is among the earliest mechanical dewatering systems. It comprises sludge and chemical feed systems, a conditioning tank, rotating drum filter, cake removal system, vacuum system, and filtrate tank.

The system uses a rotating, partially submerged drum covered with a porous filter cloth. As the drum rotates under vacuum pressure, sludge adheres to its surface and forms a cake. Vacuum is maintained until the section exits the sludge tank, and the cake is then scraped off. Conditioning chemicals improve efficiency, aiming for feed solids of 6-8%, and cakes with 13-15% solids.

=== Belt Press ===
Developed in the United States in the 1960s, belt presses operate under pressure and are based on continuous feeding, chemical conditioning, gravity drainage, and mechanical pressure.

Conditioned sludge is fed between two permeable belts, and free water is removed under gravity. Pressure is then applied to squeeze out additional water. A scraper removes the final sludge cake. This system is energy-efficient and continuous but requires belt cleaning and adequate ventilation due to possible hydrogen sulfide and methane buildup. Cake solids typically range between 10% and 20%.

=== Filter Press ===
This method, developed in England in the 1800s, creates high-solids cakes but is labor-intensive and chemically demanding. While small-scale plants require larger space due to compact units, large plants benefit from bigger surface area units.

Filter presses consist of plates pressed hydraulically or electromechanically, with each plate covered by a filter cloth. The conditioned sludge is pumped in for 20-30 minutes until the flow rate drops to 5-7%. Filtrate exits through discharge options, and the process cycle ranges from 1.5 to 4 hours.

=== Decanter (Centrifuge) ===
Decanter centrifuges operate on sedimentation principles, using centrifugal force to separate solids and liquids. Sludge is fed into a rotating drum where particles settle by specific gravity. Solids are moved out via screw conveyors, and the filtrate exits through discharge plates.

These systems can reach solids content up to 50%. Although compact and easily automated, they require high energy and investment, as well as specific maintenance.
