= Pusher centrifuge =

Device for extracting and cleaning a filtrate

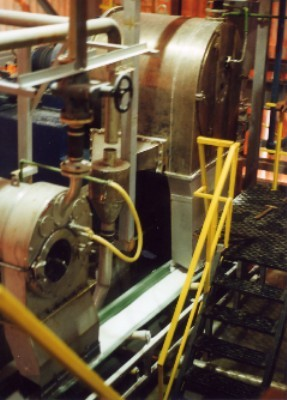
Pusher Centrifuge

A pusher centrifuge is a type of filtration device that offers continuous operation to de-water and wash materials such as relatively incompressible feed solids, free-draining crystalline materials, polymers and fibrous substances. It consists of a constant speed rotor and is fixed to one of several baskets. This assembly is applied with centrifugal force that is generated mechanically for smaller units and hydraulically for larger units to enable separation.

Pusher centrifuges can be used for a variety of applications. They were typically used in inorganic industries and later, extensively in chemical industries such as organic intermediates, plastics, food processing and rocket fuels.

A suspension feed enters the process to undergo pre-acceleration and distribution. The subsequent processes involve main filtration and intermediate de-watering, after which the main filtrate is collected. Wash liquid enters the washing step and final de-watering follows. Wash filtrate is extracted from these two stages. The final step involves discharge of solids which are then collected as the finished product. These process steps take place simultaneously in different parts of the centrifuge.

It is widely accepted due to its ease of modification, such as gas-tight and explosion protection configurations.

== Applications ==
Pusher centrifuges are mainly used in chemical, pharmaceutical, food (mainly to produce sodium chloride as common salt) and mineral industries. During the twentieth century, the pusher centrifuge was used for desiccation of comparatively large crystals and solids.

Although pushers are typically used for inorganic products, they appear in chemical industries such as organic intermediates, plastics, food processing and rocket fuels. Organic intermediates include paraxylene, adipic acid, oxalic acid caprolactam, nitrocellulose, carboxymethylcellulose, etc.

In food processing, pusher centrifugation is used to produce monosodium glutamate, salt, lysine and saccharin.

Pusher centrifugation is also used in the plastic industry, contributing to products such as PVC, polyethylene and polypropylene, and a number of other resins.

Individual products

- Soda Ash—Particle size is commonly beyond 150 μm. Feed slurry usually has 50% solids by weight, and discharged cake has about 4% moisture.
- Sodium bicarbonate—Feeds usually contain more than 40% of solids in weight with and crystals generally beyond the particle size of 45 μm. Cake production usually has only 5% water. To achieve such high efficiency of desiccation, requires device modifications.
- Paraxylene—Fed as frozen slurry with a particle size ranging from 100 to 400 μm. Purity of 99.9% is available using a single stage long basket design. Considerations and measurements have to be taken to avoid contamination of paraxylene and oil. Lip seals and rod scrapers are used on the shaft seal to eliminate cross-contamination. The feed is purified using a funnel. Vents integrated into process housing ensure that gases moves uninhibited, preventing contamination.
- Adipic acid—Undergoes repeated process of crystallisation, centrifugation and remelting to achieve the required purity. Adipic acid crystals are generally larger than 150 μm. nitric acid is reduced from 30% in the feed to 15 ppm in the cake produced. Separation of nitric acid from adipic acid is essential for further treatment.
- Cotton seed delinting—Cotton seeds contain fibres that grow and form a ball of lint. This is separated using sulphuric acid, where the lint may be used to produce cotton fibre. Adding sulphuric acid causes the lint to become brittle, hence ensuring that in the subsequent tumbling process de-linting occurs effectively.

== Advantages and limitations ==
=== Advantages ===
- Pushers offer higher processing capacities than batch filtering centrifuges such as vertical basket and inverting filter.
- Provides the best washing characteristics of any continuous centrifuge due to control of retention time and uniform cake bed.
- Gentle handling makes pushers better suited for fragile crystals.

=== Limitations ===
- Pushers require a constant feed flood due to their continuous nature.
- Although high capacities may be preferred, this may result in longer residence time.
- Typical particle sizes must be at least 150 μm and average 200 μm.
- A high viscosity feed lowers throughput.
- Pushers have a limited liquid filtration capacity and requires fast-draining materials, since it must form a cake within the period of one stroke.

== Designs ==
The designs for pusher centrifuge are as follows:

Pushers come with eithermechanical and/or hydraulic drive units. Speed can vary.

=== Single-stage ===
Single-stage units can be cylindrical or cylindrical/conical with a single long basket and screen

- Can maximize solids volumetric capacity
- Resulting cake can shear or buckle due to unstable operation of the longer screen length
- Capacity may be slightly less than with multistage units
- Lesser fine losses due to small contact of particles with the slotted screen and no reorientation of crystals between stages
- Used to achieve stability for low-speed operation

=== Multi-stage ===
Multistage (two-, three-, or four- stage designs): cylindrical and cylindrical/conical

- Most common
- Greater flexibility due to higher filtration capacity
- Reorientation can enhance wash effect on the latter portion of the first stage and through transition onto second stage

==== Three/four stage ====
- Used for largest sizes with long baskets
- Recommended for materials with high friction coefficients, low internal cake shear strength, or high compressibility, e.g., processing high rubber ABS
- Lower capacity affects performance due to correspondingly thin cakes and short retention time

=== Cylindrical/conical ===
Feed distributor design: conical/cylindrical or plate

- Optionally applied for single- and two stage- designs.
- Cylindrical feed section combined with a sloping design towards the discharge end
- Axial component of force in the conical end aids solids transport
- Lower production costs compared to that of baskets

== Process characteristics ==
The important parameters are screen area, acceleration level in the final drainage zone and cake thickness. Cake filtration affects residence time and volumetric throughput. Residence on the screen is controlled by the screen's length and diameter, cake thickness and the frequency and stroke length of the cake.

=== Feed ===
Pushers utilise the cake layer to act as a filter, hence the feed normally contains high solid concentration containing fast draining, crystalline, granular or fibrous solids. The solid concentration ranges from 25 to 65 wt%. The mean particle size suitable for pushers must be at least 150 μm. The capacity depends on the basket diameter and ranges from 1 ton/h to 120tons/h.

=== Operations ===
The cake is under centrifugal force. It becomes drier as it progresses in the basket and is discharged from the pusher basket into the solid discharge housing (pusher centrifuge operation). The stroke length ranges from 30 to 80 mm and the stroke frequency is between 45 and 90strokes/min.

The push efficiency is defined as the distance of the forward movement of the cake ring divided by the stroke length. The push efficiency is a function of the solid volumetric loading, which results in self-compensating control of varying rates. Up to 90% push efficiency is achievable depending on the cake properties. dQ3ET42T

=== Filtration rate ===
The equation for the filtration rate, Q:

(1) $Q=(\pi b \rho K \Omega^2(r_b^2 - r_p^2))/(\mu [r_b/r_p])+(KR_m)/r_b)$
(2) $\alpha K \rho_s = 1$

Where $\mu$ and $\rho$ are viscosity and liquid density, respectively. $\Omega$ is the angular speed, $K$ is the average cake permeability, which is related to equation (2), $r_p,r_c$, and $r_b$ are the radius of the liquid surface, cake surface and filter medium adjacent to the perforated bowl respectively, $R_m$ is the combined resistance, $\alpha$ is the specific resistance and $\rho s$ is the solid density.

The numerator describes the pusher's driving force, which is due to the hydrostatic pressure difference across the wall and the liquid surface. The denominator describes the resistance due to the cake layer and the filter medium.

=== Process variables ===
Performance is a function of many parameters, including particle size, viscosity, solid concentration and cake quality.

=== Particle size/porosity ===
To create the cake layer, the particle size has to be as large as practically possible. Larger particle size increases the porosity of the cake layer and allows feed liquid to pass through. Particle shape is equally important, because it determines the surface area per unit mass. As it decreases, less surface area is available to bind moisture, providing a drier cake.

=== Viscosity ===
Filtration rate is a function of the viscosity of the feed fluid. From equation (1), the relationship of the filtration rate is inversely proportional to the viscosity. Increasing viscosity means adding resistance to the fluid flow, which complicates separation of the fluids from the slurry. Consequently, the throughput of the pusher is de-rated.

=== Solid concentration ===
In most cases the solids discharge capacity/hydraulic capacity is not the limiting factor. The usual limitation is the filtration rate. Therefore, more solids can be processed by increasing the feed slurry concentration.

=== Cake quality ===
The cake quality is determined by the purity and the amount of volatile matter.

==== Purity ====
Wash liquid is introduced on the cake in order to displace the mother liquor along with the impurities. The cake wash ratio is normally between 0.1 and 0.3 kg wash/kg solids, which displace at least 95% of the feed fluid and impurities within the wash zone's normal residence time.

==== Volatile matter ====
The amount of volatile matter present in the discharge is a function of the centrifugal force (G) and the residence time at that force. Separation increases with G and hence favours the filtration rate as illustrated in equation (3).

$$G = (\Omega^2)r/g$$

where $G$ is the centrifugal force, $\Omega$ is the angular speed, $r$ is the radius of the basket, and $g$ is the gravitational force.

By relating equation 3 to equation 1, the relationship of the centrifugal force is shown to be proportional to the filtration rate. As pushers often deal with fragile crystals, the movement of the pusher plate and acceleration in the feed funnel matter, because they can break some of the particles. In addition to the movement plate, G can cause breakage and compaction, and volatile matter in the cake increases. The gentle movement of cake in low G, single stage, long basket designs results in low particle attrition. As more solids pass through, residence time decreases, which increases volatile matter in the discharge cake.

== Process design heuristics ==
The heuristics of pusher centrifuge design consider equipment size, operation sequence and recycle structure.

=== Design process ===
Overall approach:

- Define the problem
- Outline process conditions
- Make preliminary selections
- Develop a test program
- Test sample batches
- Adjust process conditions as required
- Consult equipment manufacturers
- Make final selection and obtain quotes

=== Equipment sizing ===
Variables considered in sizing equipment:

- Feed rate
- Feed concentration
- Cake thickness
- Bulk density
- Long and short baskets
- Single and two-stage baskets
- Individual drive for rotor and hydraulic system
- Easy accessibility for maintenance
- Energy consumption
- Previous applications

=== Equipment selection ===
Equipment selection is based upon test results, references from similar processes and experience and considered in terms of:

- Cost, quality and productivity
- Financial modeling

=== Optimising performance ===
For conical and cylindrical designs and assembly, the cone slant angle should not exceed sliding friction cake angle. Otherwise it would result in high vibration and poor performance.

In order to optimise capacity and performance, it is desirable to pre-concentrate the feed slurry as much as possible. Some designs have a short conical section at the feed end for thickening within the unit, but generally it is preferable to thicken before entering the centrifuge with gravity settlers, hydrocyclones or inclined screens, producing a higher concentration of solids.

The volumetric throughput for multistage designs can be increased by increasing the forced cake height while still retaining acceptable push efficiency.

=== Design selection ===
Selection of designs is usually done by scale-up from lab tests. Test data analysis should be rationalised in preparation for equipment scale-up. Computer-aided design software can assist in design and scale-up. Pilot-testing and rollout then follows.

== Waste ==
=== Production ===
The majority of liquid contained within the mixture is drawn out at an early stage, in the feed zone of the slot screen. It is discharged into the filtrate housing. After formation of solid cakes, the main by-product produced is water, which may be used in all sorts of industrial usage. Filtration cakes are washed using nozzles or waste baskets.

=== Post-treatment ===
Post-treatment processes are a function of the specifics of the waste stream and are diverse.

== Later designs ==
Design advances have enhanced performance and broaden the application range. These include additional stages, push hesitation, horizontal split process housing, integrated hydraulics, seals, pre-drained funnels and an integrated thickening function.

=== Stages ===
B&P Process Equipment and Systems (B&P) makes the largest single-stage pusher centrifuge, which they claimed to be superior to multistage designs. They claimed that additional impurities enter the liquid housing due to additional particles tumbling in each stage. The problem can be overcome by using a shorter inner basket with smaller diameter between the pusher plates and the basket and enabling pusher movement to take place between the pusher plate and the basket as well as between the inner basket and the outer basket. Compared to single-stage pushers that have pusher movement only between pusher plate and basket, multistage centrifuges have the advantages that the cake height is reduced, filtration resistance is lower and lesser force is required.

=== Push hesitation ===
Push hesitation holds the pusher plate in the back stroke, allowing the cake to build on itself. The cake acts as the filtering media that can even capture finer solids. This reduces the loss of solids passing through the wedge slots. Although this modification reduces capacity, it has helped improved the solid capture efficiency and make pusher centrifuges applicable to smaller particles.

=== Horizontal split process housing ===
This allows the removal of the rotating assembly without disassembling the basket and pusher centrifuge from the shafting assembly.

=== Integral hydraulics ===
An automated mechanism allows the system to operate independently.

=== Seals ===
Shaft seals eliminate the possibility of cross-contamination between the hydraulic and process ends. Options include a centrifugal liquid ring seal and a non-contacting inert gas purged labyrinth seal that eliminates leakage.

=== Pre-drained funnel ===
The pre-drained funnel removes a portion of the feed fluid through a puncture surface. This feature helps to concentrate the feed, which is especially important for drainage-limited applications. However the funnel cannot be back-washed therefore this feature is only available for crystals that tend not to back-crystallise.

=== Integrated thickening ===
Integrating the thickening function enables the pusher to be loaded with mixture with as little as 30-35% wt of solid. It also reduces process costs of solid-liquid separation by as much as 20%.

== Bibliography ==
- Green, Don W.; Perry, Robert H. (2008). Perry's Chemical Engineerings' Handbook (8 ed.). New York: McGraw Hill. pp. 1056–1065..
- Technologies, F.P (2008). "FX Pusher: Pusher Centrifuges"..
- Dubal, Gitesh (May 2000). "The Pusher Centrifuge: Operation, Applications and Advantages". Filtration & Separation. 37 (4): 24–27. doi:10.1016/S0015-1882(00)88849-7. ISSN 0015-1882..
- Ltd, F. "Pusher centrifuges for basic, agricultural and petrochemical industries" (PDF)..
- Schmidt, Peter (Dec 2010). "Filtration Centrifuges: An overview". Chemical Engineering. 117 (13). New York: Access Intelligence LLC: 34–38. ISSN 0009-2460..
- Ruthven, D.M. (1997). Encyclopedia of Separation Technology. Vol. 1. Wiley. ISBN 9780471161240..
- Wakeman, R.J; Tarleton, E.S (1993). "Computer Based Selection of Solid/Liquid Separation Equipment" (PDF). Process Advances in Filtration and Separation Technology. 7. Chicago: 530–543..
- "World's Largest Single-Stage Pusher Centrifuge". Filtration & Separation. 34 (10): 1002. December 1997. doi:10.1016/S0015-1882(97)90167-1. ISSN 0015-1882..
- "Innovating the Pusher Centrifuge for Bulk Chemical Separation". Filtration & Separation. 40 (6): 38–39. July–August 2003. doi:10.1016/S0015-1882(03)00634-7. ISSN 0015-1882..
