= Screen scroll centrifuge =

Screen/Scroll centrifuge is a filtering or screen centrifuge which is also known as worm screen or conveyor discharge centrifuge. This centrifuge was first introduced in the midst of 19th century. After developing new technologies over the decades, it is now one of the widely used processes in many industries for the separation of crystalline, granular or fibrous materials from a solid-liquid mixture. Also, this process is considered to dry the solid material. This process has been some of the most frequently seen within, especially, coal preparation industry. Moreover, it can be found in other industries such as chemical, environmental, food and other mining fields.

== Fundamentals ==
Screen scroll centrifuge is a filtering centrifuge which separates solids and liquid from a solid-liquid mixture. This type of centrifuge is commonly used with a continuous process in which slurry containing both solid and liquid is continuously fed into and continuously discharged from the centrifuge. In a typical screen scroll centrifuge, the basic principle is that entering feed is separated into liquid and solids as two products. The feed is transported from small to larger diameter end of frustoconical basket by the inclination of the screen basket and slightly different speed of the scraper worm. The solid material retained on the screen is moved along the cone via an internal screw conveyor while the liquid output is obtained due to centrifugal force causes the feed slurry to pass through the screen openings. Furthermore, screen scroll centrifuge may rotate either in horizontal or vertical position.

== Range of applications ==
The use of screen scroll centrifuge has been seen in numerous process engineering industries. One of the most noticeable applications is within coal preparation industry. In addition to that, this centrifuge is also employed in the dewatering of potash, gilsonite, in salt processes and in dewatering various sands. Moreover, it is also designed for use in the food processing industry, for instant, dairy production, and cocoa butter equivalents and other confectionery fats.

== Designs available ==
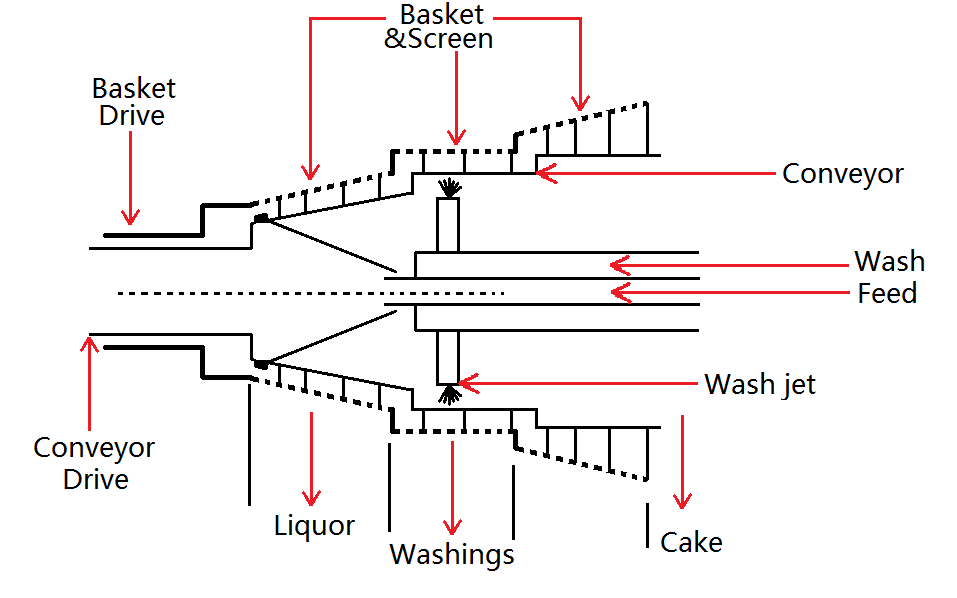
Schematic of 3 stage Screen/Srcoll centrifuge

Screen scroll centrifuges, which are also known as worm screen or the conveyor discharge, instigate the solids to move along the cone through an internal screw conveyor. The conveyor in the centrifuge spins at a differential speed to the conical screen and centrifugal forces approximately 1800g - 2600g facilitate reasonable throughputs. Some of the screen scroll centrifuges are available with up to four separate stages for improved performance. The first stage is used to de-liquor the feed which is followed by a washing stage, with the final stage being used for drying. In an advanced screen scroll centrifuge with four stages, two separate washes are employed in order to segregate the wash liquors.

The two most common types of screen/scroll centrifuge used in many industrial applications are vertical screen/scroll centrifuge and horizontal screen/scroll centrifuge.

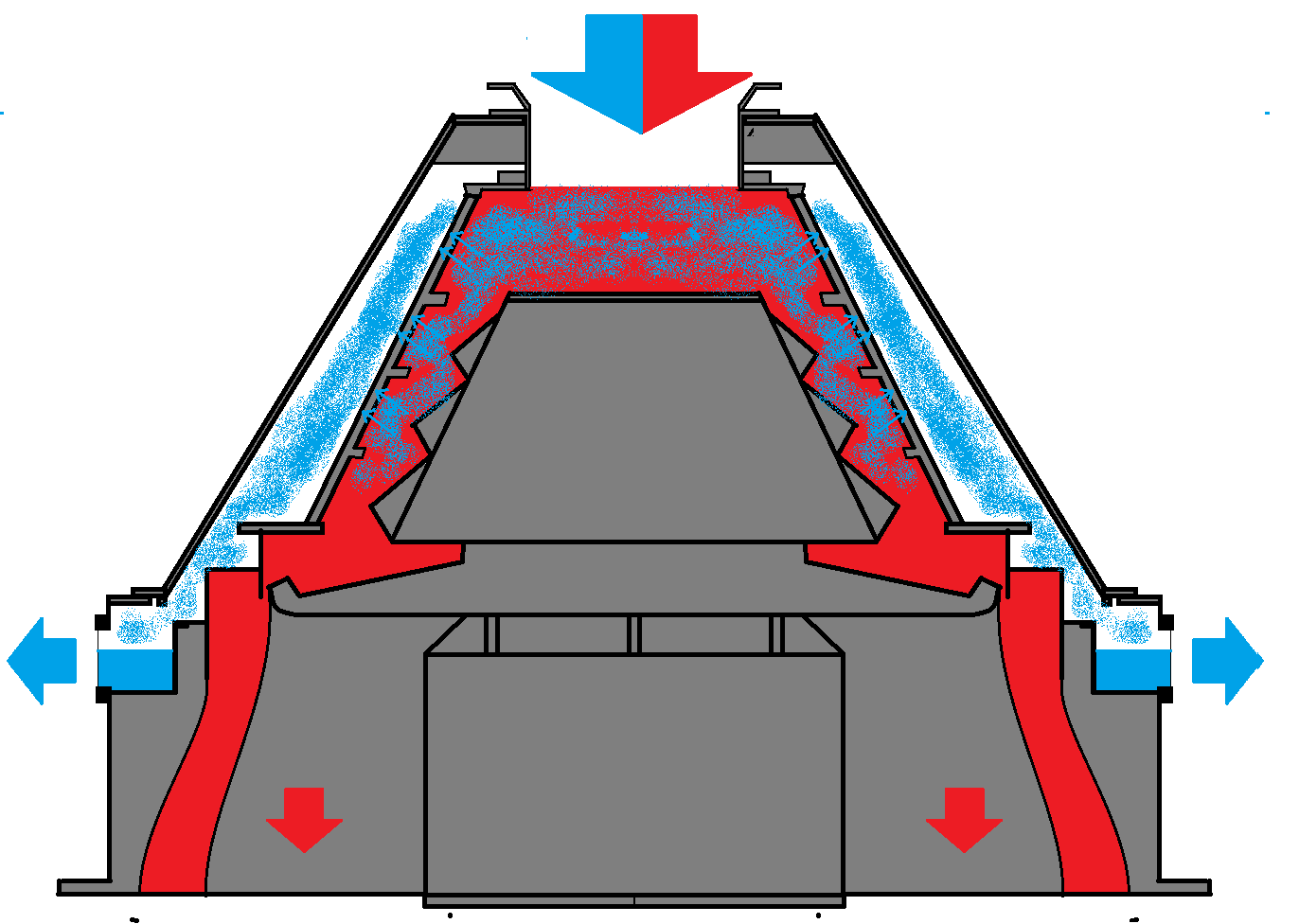
a typical structure of a vertical screen scroll centrifuge

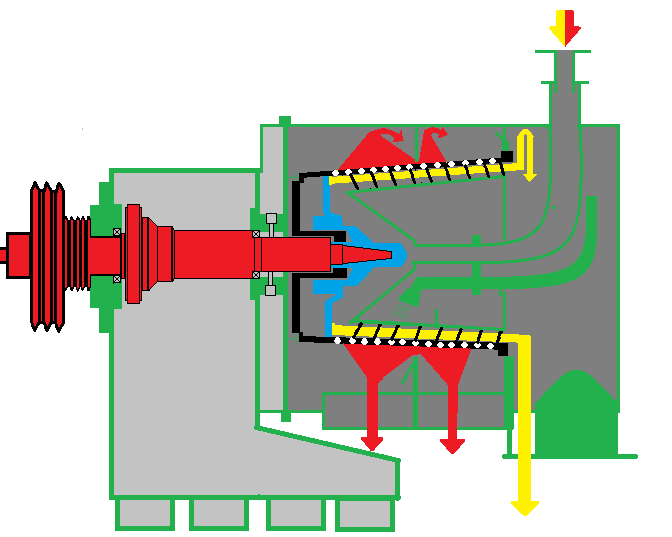
Horizontal Centrifuge figure

=== Vertical screen scroll centrifuge ===
Vertical screen scroll is built with the main components of screen, scroll, basket, housing, and helical screw. Feed containing liquid and solid materials is introduced into vertical screen scroll centrifuge from the top. This is sped up by centrifugal acceleration produced from the rotating parts contacted. As such, centrifugal force slings liquids through the openings, while solids are held on the screen surface as they cannot pass through because of granular particles larger than the screen pores or due to agglomeration. Movement of solids across the screen surface is manipulated by flights. Liquids that have gone through screen are obtained and discharged through effluent outlet from the side of machine, while solids collected from the screen fall by gravity through the bottom discharge of the machine.

Some of the available vertical screen scroll centrifuges are CMI model EBR and CMI model EBW which are manufactured by Centrifugal & Mechanical Industries (CMI). The former can dewater coarser particles size ranging from 1.5 in to 28 mesh whereas the latter can dewater finer particles size ranging from 1 mm to 150 mesh.

=== Horizontal screen scroll centrifuge ===
Similar to a vertical screen scroll centrifuge, a horizontal screen scroll centrifuge is constructed of several main parts: screen, scroll, basket, housing, and helical screw. The screen and the basket with frustoconical geometry are assembled into the housing in a horizontal axis. Inside the frustoconical structure there is a tubular wall. Inside the tubular wall there is a cylinder of helical screw which flight on scroll pass. The tubular wall will have a slightly different angular speed to the helical screw.

The solid-liquid mixture is fed into the closed rearward portion of the scroll. The rotation movement of the scroll, screen, and basket allows the liquid to pass through from the openings on the screen (via centrifugal force). The solid remains will be separated according to size due to the difference of the angular velocity of the helical screw and the basket. The helical screw pushes the solid material to be discharged to the forward end of the scroll. The processing time depends on helical screw pitch and the angular velocity difference. It may also be influenced by the design of the scroll feed opening. The solid particles exiting are usually collected via a conveyor in the collection unit.

== Main process characteristics and its assessment ==
The performance and output efficiency of the screen scroll centrifuge can be affected by several factors, such as particle size and feed concentration, flow rate of feed and screen mesh size of the centrifuge.

=== Particle size and feed solids ===
Particle size in the feed is one of the most important parameters to be taken into account since the choice of slot and screen holes size of screen scroll centrifuge or different types of process depends on feed contents. Non-uniform particles size in the feed can cause partial blockage on the screen due to the small size solids blocking the holes besides normal and larger particles. So, liquids flow over the screen instead of passing through it. As such, it requires higher solids content in the feed in order to obtain good and reasonable results - normally greater than 15% and up to 60% w/w. Nevertheless, the flow rate of the feed can be monitored to overcome this setback. Another possible method is to carry out pre-treatment on the feed to be used for screen scroll centrifuge, for example, by the filtration process. Particle size, thereafter, can be analysed and the selection of particular screen size can be determined. However, it increases the total operating cost.

Typical operating range of particle size and feed concentration for screen scroll centrifuges are 100 – 20,000 μm and 3 – 90% mass of the solids in the feed. In general, slot and screen holes size range 40 - 200 μm with open areas from 5 - 15%. Nevertheless, recent products are claimed to be able to handle the particle size as low as 50 μm. Screens are generally metallic foil or wedge wire and more recently metallic and composite screens perforated with micro-waterjet cutting.

=== Feed flow rate ===
As mentioned in the previous section, feed flow rate is one of the crucial parameters to be controlled to achieve highly efficient output. Centrifuge performance is sensitive to feed flow rate. Even though increasing the feed flow rate can prevent from blocking the screens, it is mentioned that wetter solids is achieved. This is due to increase in hydraulic load on the centrifuge when higher feed rate is applied, while differential rotation speed between the cone and scroll, and retention time within dewatering zone of the basket are fixed. In addition, higher feed rate leads to a surge in the effective thickness of the bed since it is dragged down by the scroll.

=== Basket geometry and its material ===
The material variations for constructing and the design of main components of centrifuge such as the screen plate, helical screw and basket could actually improve the longer life term of the machine. Another important factor is the conical basket size and its angle within the centrifuge. Different basket size and angle between basket and helical screw can vary the angular speed; as a result, the quality of the product is affected. Moreover, the shape of the helical screw is also important since it optimizes the transportation of cake. A selection of typical screen scroll centrifuge with different basket sizes found in the market is presented in the following Table 1. The helical scroll and conical basket sections are commonly built at the angle of 10°, 15° and 20°.

Table 1 A selection of screen scroll centrifuge sizes

Basket Diameter, mm	250	400	550	800	1000
Maximum rpm	3800	3000	2000	1500	1200
Maximum Centrifugal G at basket lip	2000	2000	1500	1000	800
Maximum throughput t.h^{−1}	3.5	10	25	50	70

== Advantages and limitations over competitive processes ==
The screen scroll centrifuge has an advantage of having a driven scroll helical conveyor which gives a small differential speed relative to the conical basket. The helical conveyor is installed in the centrifuge to control the transport of the incoming feed, allowing the residence time of the solids in the basket to be increased giving enhanced process performance. Moreover, the helical conveyor and conical basket sections are designed in certain angle of 10°, 15° and 20° being common such that solid particles are dragged on the conveyor along the cone towards the discharge point. As a result, there is no formation of even solids layer but form piles of triangular section in front of the blades of the conveyor. The residence time within screen scroll centrifuge is typically about 4 to 15 seconds which is longer than normal simpler conical basket centrifuge. This permits a sufficient interaction time between wash liquids and cake. However, the presence of the conveyor causes crystals breakage and abrasion problem as well as the formation of uneven solids layer which can lead to poor washing. This can be controlled by conveyor speed.

TEMA engineers, specialist in centrifuges, claims that horizontal screen scroll centrifuge can achieve higher overall recovery of fines up to 99% can be achieved, combining with very low product moisture. Furthermore, it is recommended that operating with the feed containing more than 40% solids with minimal size of 100 μm achieve the best results. The use of the screen scroll centrifuge with horizontal orientation is more economical as its capacity is 40% more tonnage than that of vertical orientation of the same size for the same energy cost. In addition, maintenance of the horizontal screen scroll centrifuge can be carried out easily since total disassembly is not needed. Nowadays, screen scroll centrifuges are equipped with CIP-cleaning system for the purpose of self-cleaning within the centrifuge.

On the other hand, it has a downside of possible blockage to the screen due to the feed slurry containing small crystals besides large and normal solids crystals. Consequently, this causes the screen to become less permeable so the liquids flow over the screen rather than passing through the screen mesh. This problem, however, can be overcome by reducing the flow rate of feed.

== Possible heuristics to be used during design of the process ==
The basket, helical screw, screen filter, and other parts are designed to meet up the process input and certain performance. Most of the parts are made from metal to be able to handle the separation process. The bigger the bowl could contain more input but at the same time could increase the process and residence time. The helical screw is made to be able to hold and move the particle around to be able to control the cake movement. The screen filter is made to be able to sieve the particle and the water. The cleaning process for this type of machine could be difficult compare to other separation model. The design mostly being optimized with low maintenance feature and provided with good sealing to prevent the leaking and breakup of the construction.

== Necessary post-treatment systems ==
After removing liquids from the slurry to form a cake of solids in the centrifuge, further or post-treatment is required to completely dry the solids. Drying is the most common process used in the industry. Another post-treatment system is to treat the products with another stage of deliquoring process.

== New development ==
The modern screen/scroll centrifuge has been modified in several ways from the original design:

- The addition of a long-life parts package which reduces sliding abrasion in the feed zone by having a cone cap to deflect the feed input from the top. The mechanic of the process has also been optimized to achieve better products.
- New screens have become available that are perforated with a micro-waterjet process. These screens offer significantly greater product recovery in combination with dryer output. This manufacturing process also allows screens to be made from extreme abrasion resistant materials such as tungsten-carbide composites for very high wear applications such as coal.
- Ultrafine screening quality modification allows up to 50 micrometre. The modification is made through the screen filter which could produce higher solid recovery. Other developments made on the screen scroll centrifuge are tight sealing, ability to work on do continuous mode, minimum power consumption, low friction gear, and less maintenance design. All of these modifications are made to ensure safety of the process with less power consumption and for the ease of maintenance.
