= Centrifuge =

Device using centrifugal force to separate fluids

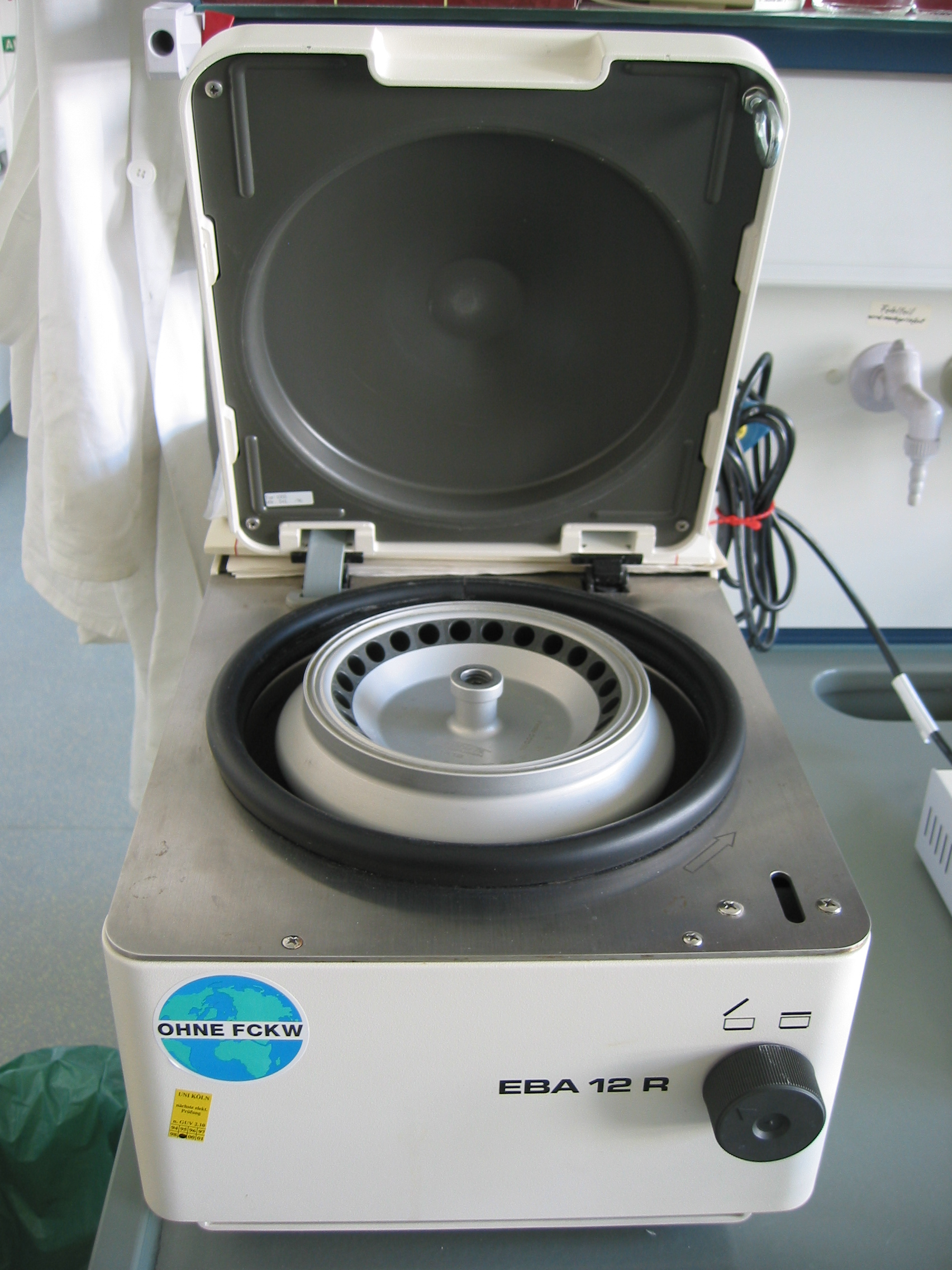
A laboratory tabletop centrifuge. The rotating unit, called the rotor, has fixed holes drilled at an angle (to the vertical), visible inside the smooth silver rim. Sample tubes are placed in these slots and the motor is spun. As the centrifugal force is in the horizontal plane and the tubes are fixed at an angle, the particles have to travel only a short distance before they hit the wall of the tube and then slide down to the bottom. These angle rotors are very popular in the lab for routine use.

A centrifuge is a device that uses centrifugal force to subject a specimen to a specified constant force – for example, to separate various components of a fluid. This is achieved by spinning the fluid at high speed within a container, thereby separating fluids of different densities (e.g., cream from milk) or liquids from solids. It works by causing denser substances and particles to move outward in the radial direction. At the same time, objects that are less dense are displaced and moved to the centre. In a laboratory centrifuge that uses sample tubes, the radial acceleration causes denser particles to settle to the bottom of the tube, while low-density substances rise to the top. A centrifuge can be a very effective filter that separates contaminants from the main body of fluid.

Industrial scale centrifuges are commonly used in manufacturing and waste processing to sediment suspended solids, or to separate immiscible liquids. An example is the cream separator found in dairies. Very high speed centrifuges and ultracentrifuges able to provide very high accelerations can separate fine particles down to the nano-scale, and molecules of different masses. Large centrifuges are used to simulate high gravity or acceleration environments (for example, high-G training for test pilots). Medium-sized centrifuges are used in washing machines and at some swimming pools to draw water out of fabrics. Gas centrifuges are used for isotope separation, such as to enrich nuclear fuel for fissile isotopes.

== History ==
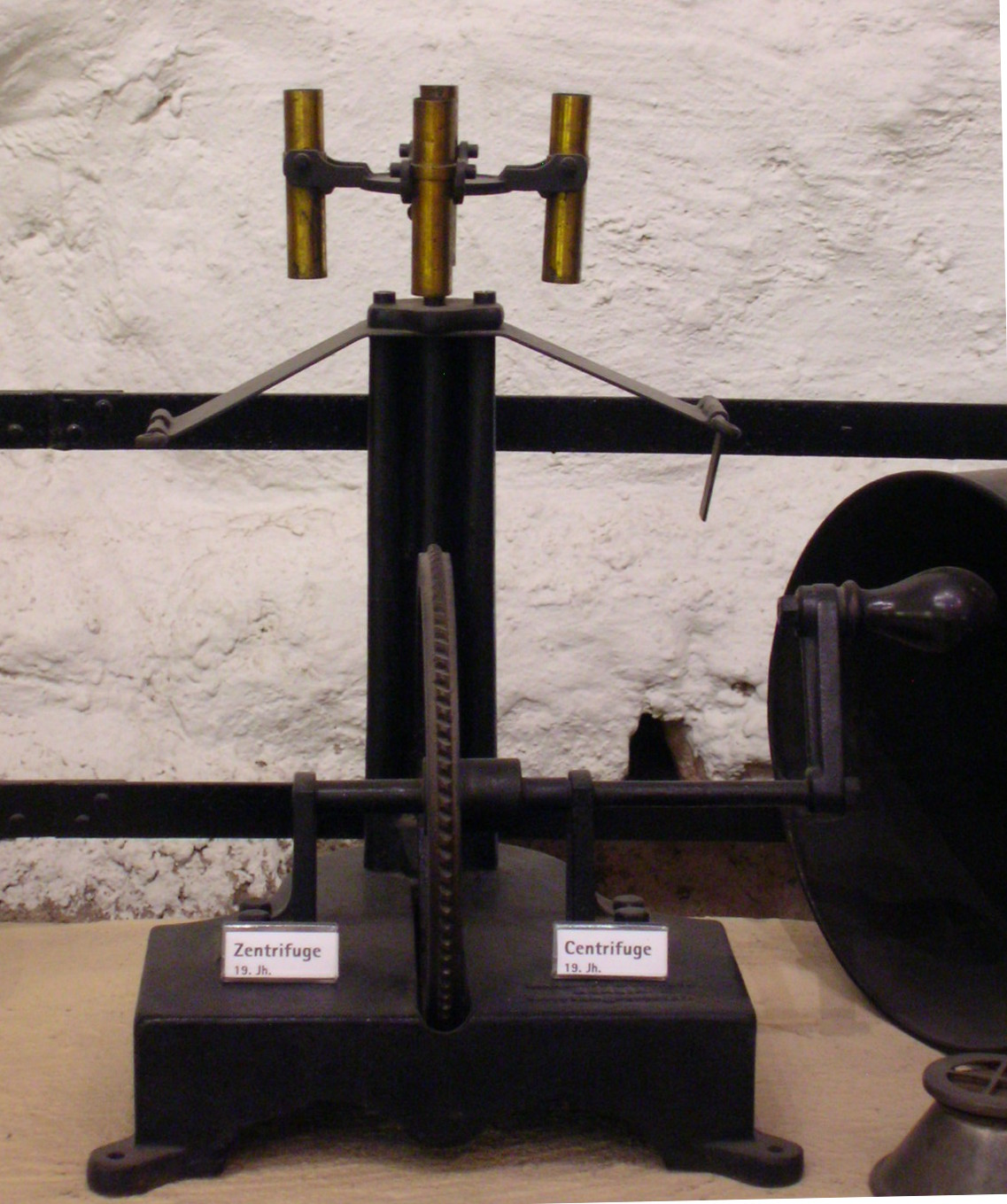
A 19th-century hand-cranked laboratory centrifuge.

English military engineer Benjamin Robins (1707–1751) invented a whirling arm apparatus to determine drag. In 1864, Antonin Prandtl proposed the idea of a dairy centrifuge to separate cream from milk. The idea was subsequently put into practice by his brother, Alexander Prandtl, who made improvements to his brother's design, and exhibited a working butterfat extraction machine in 1875.

== Types ==
A centrifuge machine can be described as a machine with a rapidly rotating container that applies centrifugal force to its contents. There are multiple types of centrifuge, which can be classified by intended use or by rotor design:

Types by rotor design:

- Fixed-angle centrifuges are designed to hold the sample containers at a constant angle relative to the central axis.
- Swinging head (or swinging bucket) centrifuges, in contrast to fixed-angle centrifuges, have a hinge where the sample containers are attached to the central rotor. This allows all of the samples to swing outwards as the centrifuge is spun.
- Continuous tubular centrifuges do not have individual sample vessels and are used for high volume applications.

Types by intended use:

- Laboratory centrifuges, are general-purpose instruments of several types with distinct, but overlapping, capabilities. These include clinical centrifuges, superspeed centrifuges and preparative ultracentrifuges.
- Analytical ultracentrifuges are designed to perform sedimentation analysis of macromolecules using the principles devised by Theodor Svedberg.
- Haematocrit centrifuges are used to measure the volume percentage of red blood cells in whole blood.
- Gas centrifuges, including Zippe-type centrifuges, for isotopic separations in the gas phase.

Industrial centrifuges may otherwise be classified according to the type of separation of the high density fraction from the low density one.

Generally, there are two types of centrifuges: the filtration and sedimentation centrifuges. For the filtration or the so-called screen centrifuge, the drum is perforated and is inserted with a filter, for example a filter cloth, wire mesh or lot screen. The suspension flows through the filter and the drum with the perforated wall from the inside to the outside. In this way, the solid material is restrained and can be removed. The kind of removing depends on the type of centrifuge, for example manually or periodically. Common types are:

- Centrifugal oil filters
- Screen/scroll centrifuges (Screen centrifuges, where the centrifugal acceleration allows the liquid to pass through a screen of some sort, through which the solids cannot go (due to granulometry larger than the screen gap or due to agglomeration))
- Pusher centrifuges
- Peeler centrifuges
- Inverting filter centrifuges
- Sliding discharge centrifuges
- Pendulum centrifuges
- Sedimentation centrifuges

In the centrifuges, the drum is a solid wall (not perforated). This type of centrifuge is used for the purification of a suspension. For the acceleration of the natural deposition, process of suspension the centrifuges use centrifugal force. With so-called overflow centrifuges, the suspension is drained off and the liquid is added constantly. Common types are:

- Separator centrifuges (Continuous liquid); common types are:
  - Self-cleaning Centrifuges
  - Conical plate centrifuges
- Tubular centrifuges
- Decanter centrifuges, also called Solid bowl centrifuges, in which there is no physical separation between the solid and liquid phase, rather an accelerated settling due to centrifugal acceleration.
- Basket Centrifuges: Common in chemical and pharmaceutical industries, especially for solid-liquid separation. Key types include:
- Top Discharge Basket Centrifuges: The cake is manually removed from the top after the cycle.
- Bottom Discharge Basket Centrifuges: Offer automatic discharge of solids through the bottom, improving efficiency and reducing manual handling.
- Bag Lifting Type Vertical Basket Centrifuge: Feature a removable filter bag, allowing for easy and safe discharge of solids with minimal human contact, enhancing hygiene and operator safety.

Though most modern centrifuges are electrically powered, a hand-powered variant inspired by the whirligig has been developed for medical applications in developing countries.

Many designs have been shared for free and open-source centrifuges that can be digitally manufactured. The open-source hardware designs for hand-powered centrifuge for larger volumes of fluids with a radial velocity of over 1732 rpm and over 50 N of relative centrifugal force can be completely 3D-printed for about $25. Other open hardware designs use custom 3D printed fixtures with inexpensive electric motors to make low-cost centrifuges (e.g. the Dremelfuge that uses a Dremel power tool) or CNC cut out OpenFuge.

== Uses ==
=== Laboratory separations ===
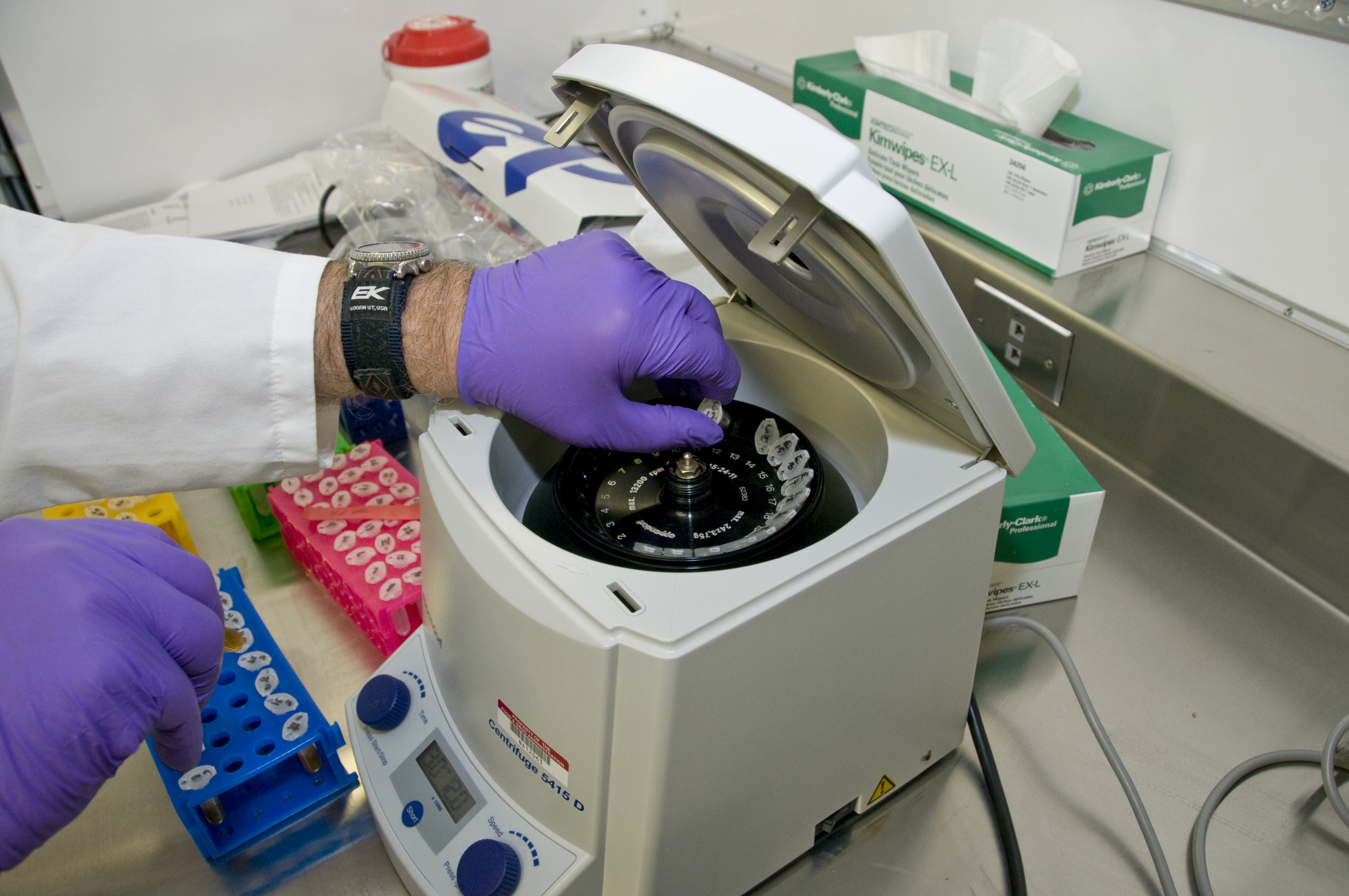
Samples placed in a small laboratory centrifuge

A wide variety of laboratory-scale centrifuges are used in chemistry, biology, biochemistry and clinical medicine for isolating and separating suspensions and immiscible liquids. They vary widely in speed, capacity, temperature control, and other characteristics. Laboratory centrifuges often can accept a range of different fixed-angle and swinging bucket rotors able to carry different numbers of centrifuge tubes and rated for specific maximum speeds. Controls vary from simple electrical timers to programmable models able to control acceleration and deceleration rates, running speeds, and temperature regimes. Ultracentrifuges spin the rotors under vacuum, eliminating air resistance and enabling exact temperature control. Zonal rotors and continuous flow systems are capable of handing bulk and larger sample volumes, respectively, in a laboratory-scale instrument.

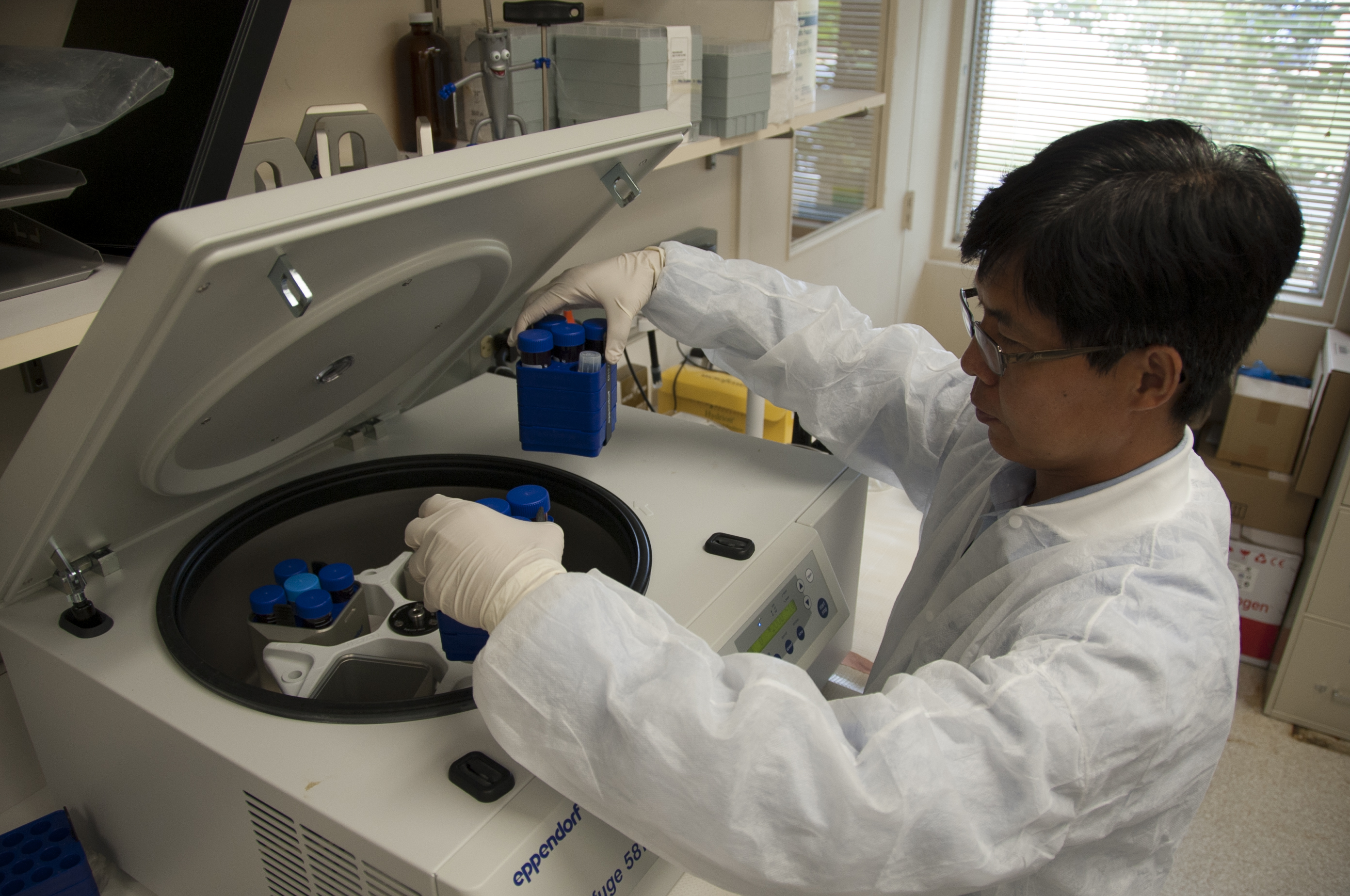
Whole blood is often separated, using a centrifuge, into components for storage and transport

An application in laboratories is blood separation. Blood separates into cells and proteins (RBC, WBC, platelets, etc.) and serum. DNA preparation is another common application for pharmacogenetics and clinical diagnosis. DNA samples are purified and the DNA is prepped for separation by adding buffers and then centrifuging it for a certain amount of time. The blood waste is then removed and another buffer is added and spun inside the centrifuge again. Once the blood waste is removed and another buffer is added the pellet can be suspended and cooled. Proteins can then be removed and the entire thing can be centrifuged again and the DNA can be isolated completely. Specialized cytocentrifuges are used in medical and biological laboratories to concentrate cells for microscopic examination.

=== Isotope separation ===
Other centrifuges, the first being the Zippe-type centrifuge, separate isotopes, and these kinds of centrifuges are in use in nuclear power and nuclear weapon programs.

=== Aeronautics and astronautics ===
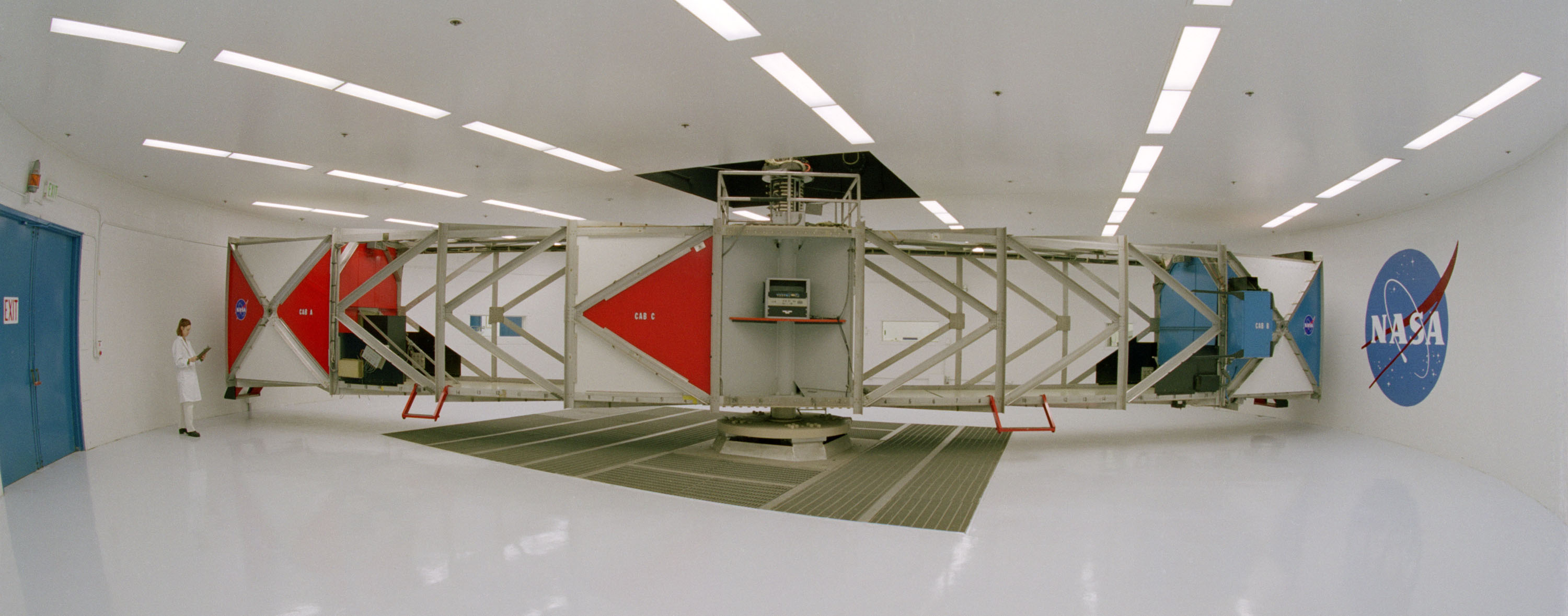
The 20 g centrifuge at the NASA Ames Research Center

Human centrifuges are exceptionally large centrifuges that test the reactions and tolerance of pilots and astronauts to acceleration above those experienced in the Earth's gravity.

The first centrifuges used for human research were used by Erasmus Darwin, the grandfather of Charles Darwin. The first large-scale human centrifuge designed for aeronautical training was created in Germany in 1933.

The US Air Force at Brooks City Base, Texas, operates a human centrifuge while awaiting completion of the new human centrifuge in construction at Wright-Patterson AFB, Ohio. The centrifuge at Brooks City Base is operated by the United States Air Force School of Aerospace Medicine for the purpose of training and evaluating prospective fighter pilots for high-g flight in Air Force fighter aircraft.

The use of large centrifuges to simulate physiological effects of gravity has been proposed for future long-duration space missions. Exposure to this simulated gravity would prevent or reduce the bone decalcification and muscle atrophy that affect individuals exposed to long periods of freefall.

Non-Human centrifuge

At the European Space Agency (ESA) technology center ESTEC (in Noordwijk, the Netherlands), an 8-metre (26 ft) diameter centrifuge is used to expose samples in fields of life sciences as well as physical sciences. This Large Diameter Centrifuge (LDC) began operation in 2007. Samples can be exposed to a maximum of 20 times Earth's gravity. With its four arms and six freely swinging out gondolas it is possible to expose samples with different g-levels at the same time. Gondolas can be fixed at eight different positions. Depending on their locations one could e.g. run an experiment at 5 and 10g in the same run. Each gondola can hold an experiment of a maximum 80 kilograms (180 lb). Experiments performed in this facility ranged from zebra fish, metal alloys, plasma, cells, liquids, Planaria, Drosophila or plants.

=== Industrial centrifugal separator ===
Industrial centrifugal separator is a coolant filtration system for separating particles from liquid like, grinding machining coolant. It is usually used for non-ferrous particles separation such as, silicon, glass, ceramic, and graphite etc. The filtering process does not require any consumption parts like filter bags, which saves the earth from harm.

=== Geotechnical centrifuge modeling ===
Geotechnical centrifuge modeling is used for physical testing of models involving soils. Centrifuge acceleration is applied to scale models to scale the gravitational acceleration and enable prototype scale stresses to be obtained in scale models. Problems such as building and bridge foundations, earth dams, tunnels, and slope stability, including effects such as blast loading and earthquake shaking.

=== Synthesis of materials ===
High gravity conditions generated by centrifuge are applied in the chemical industry, casting, and material synthesis. The convection and mass transfer are greatly affected by the gravitational condition. Researchers reported that the high-gravity level can effectively affect the phase composition and morphology of the products.

=== Commercial applications ===
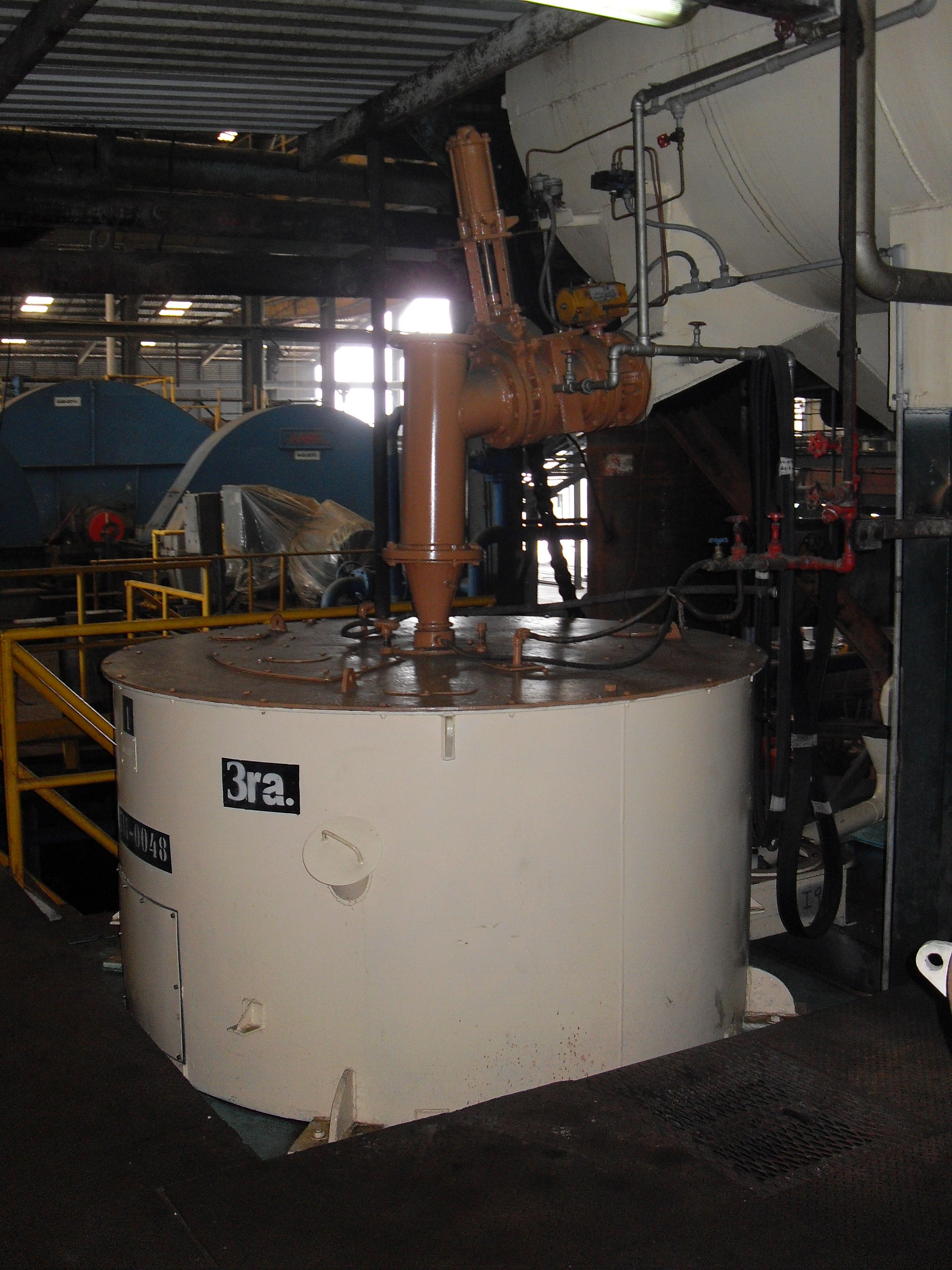
Sugar centrifugal machines for separating sugar crystals

- Standalone centrifuges for drying (hand-washed) clothes – usually with a water outlet.
- Washing machines are designed to act as centrifuges to get rid of excess water in laundry loads.
- Centrifuges are used in the attraction Mission: SPACE, located at Epcot in Walt Disney World, which propels riders using a combination of a centrifuge and a motion simulator to simulate the feeling of going into space.
- In soil mechanics, centrifuges utilize centrifugal acceleration to match soil stresses in a scale model to those found in reality.
- Large industrial centrifuges are commonly used in water and wastewater treatment to dry sludges. The resulting dry product is often termed cake, and the water leaving a centrifuge after most of the solids have been removed is called centrate.
- Large industrial centrifuges are also used in the oil industry to remove solids from the drilling fluid.
- Disc-stack centrifuges used by some companies in the oil sands industry to separate small amounts of water and solids from bitumen
- Centrifuges are used to separate cream (remove fat) from milk; see Separator (milk).

== Mathematical description ==
Protocols for centrifugation typically specify the amount of acceleration to be applied to the sample, rather than specifying a rotational speed such as revolutions per minute. This distinction is important because two rotors with different diameters running at the same rotational speed will subject samples to different accelerations. During circular motion the acceleration is the product of the radius and the square of the angular velocity $\omega$, and the acceleration relative to "g" is traditionally named "relative centrifugal force" (RCF). The acceleration is measured in multiples of "g" (or × "g"), the standard acceleration due to gravity at the Earth's surface, a dimensionless quantity given by the expression:

$$\text{RCF} = \frac{r \omega^2}{g}$$

where

$\textstyle g$ is earth's gravitational acceleration,
$\textstyle r$ is the rotational radius,
$\omega$ is the angular velocity in radians per unit time

This relationship may be written as

$$\text{RCF} = \frac{10^{-3} r_\text{mm} \, \left(\frac{2 \pi N_\text{RPM}}{60}\right)^2}{g}$$

or

$$\text{RCF} = 1.118(2)\, \times 10^{-6}\, r_\text{mm} \, N_\text{RPM}^2$$

where

$\textstyle r_\text{mm}$ is the rotational radius measured in millimeters (mm), and
$\textstyle N_\text{RPM}$ is rotational speed measured in revolutions per minute (RPM).

To avoid having to perform a mathematical calculation every time, one can find nomograms for converting RCF to rpm for a rotor of a given radius. A ruler or other straight edge lined up with the radius on one scale, and the desired RCF on another scale, will point at the correct rpm on the third scale. Based on automatic rotor recognition, modern centrifuges have a button for automatic conversion from RCF to rpm and vice versa.

== See also ==
- Centrifugal force
- Centrifugation
- Clearing factor
- Honey extractor
- Hydroextractor
- Lamm equation
- Sedimentation coefficient
- Sedimentation
- Separation process—includes list of techniques
