= Solid bowl centrifuge =

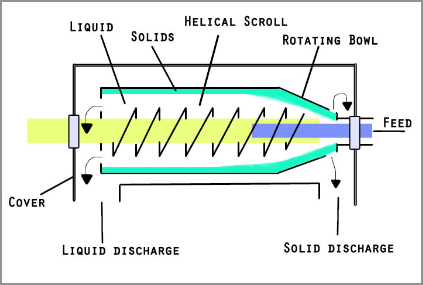
Solid Bowl Centrifuge

A solid bowl centrifuge is a type of centrifuge that uses the principle of sedimentation. A centrifuge is used to separate a mixture that consists of two substances with different densities by using the centrifugal force resulting from continuous rotation. It is normally used to separate solid-liquid, liquid-liquid, and solid-solid mixtures. Solid bowl centrifuges are widely used in various industrial applications, such as wastewater treatment, coal manufacturing, and polymer manufacturing. One advantage of solid bowl centrifuges for industrial uses is the simplicity of installation compared to other types of centrifuge. There are three design types of solid bowl centrifuge, which are conical, cylindrical, and conical-cylindrical.

== Range of applications ==
=== Wastewater sludge treatment ===
During the industrial process of wastewater treatment, huge quantity of sludge is produced. The sludge needs to be disposed of or having further treatment. One of the treatment methods available is thickening the sludge by using solid bowl centrifuges. While prior sludge have the concentration around 0.5-1 % of dry solid, after the thickening process, it will contain up to 5-6% of dry solids. This process reduces the waste of active sludge volume by more than 80% as well as minimizing the sludge amount for digestion by 30-40%. Furthermore, less disposal sludge also lowers the cost of polymer and improves the characteristics of dewatering.

=== Coal treatment underflow slurry ===
Coal slurry, which contains around 6% solids by weight and nearly 60% of 10 mm material, is thickened using solid bowl centrifuges. By using this centrifuge technique, the concentration of the end product could reach up to 55-60% solids without extra chemical added. Additionally, solid bowl centrifuge is also used in the water removal process from waste slurry obtained from coal-cleaning facility.

=== Polymer manufacture ===
Solid bowl centrifuge is used in the manufacture of polymer to recover acetates from polymer slurry. The conical beach is used for internal washing for acetates recovery improvement. Previously, the centrifuge only consists of single lead conveyor, and then improved using double lead conveyor in order to increase the capacity. Furthermore, the extra double lead conveyor with minimized pitch is used to improve the acetate yield.

== Advantages and disadvantages ==
=== Advantages ===
- Rapid start-up and shut down.
- Relatively simple installation.
- Compact design.
- Available on a pilot scale for research and development.
- Functions automatically with minimal monitoring and control units.
- Flexible usage for both thickening and dewatering process.
- Needs relatively low polymer quantity compared to other types, except basket centrifuges.
- Large liquid capacity and able to deal with more concentrated slurry.
- Produces more dry solids and has better solids retention. depending on bowl size and RPM

=== Disadvantages ===
- Less surface area for clarification compared to disk stack.
- May generate heat that could damage the thermo sensitive products.
- High maintenance, especially for scroll wear part. It is recommended to have hard surface and abrasion protector.
- Produces unwanted noise, especially for high G centrifuges.
- Occasionally produce vibration that disturbs electronic control and structural components.
- High power consumption.
- Requires pretesting for selecting optimum machine setting before starting the normal service.

== Designs available ==
Solid bowl centrifuge designs are divided into three different types based on the solid bowl shapes, which are conical, cylindrical, and cylindrical-conical. The choice of the centrifuge design in a particular industry is determined by the characteristics of the slurry and solids.

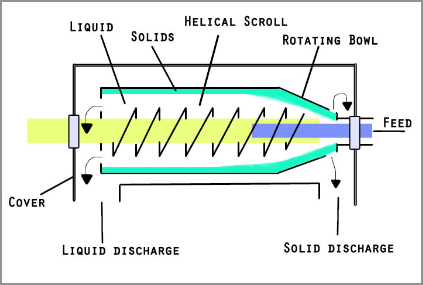
largethumb

Solid Bowl Centrifuge Part

=== Solid bowl centrifuge based on shapes design ===
==== Conical solid bowl centrifuge ====
Among the three designs, initially conical bowl was the most preferable design due to its maximum allowance of water removal and its excellent classifying ability. However, this design is less effective in achieving a high centrate quality, which makes it a poor clarifier.

==== Cylindrical solid bowl centrifuge ====
Unlike conical bowl design, cylindrical bowl design does not allow maximum water removal, and thus mainly produces wet cakes. In addition, it is also a less effective classifier. However, cylindrical bowl design is more effective in achieving a high centrate quality compared to the conical bowl design, which makes it a better dewatering device compared to the conical bowl design.

==== Conical-cylindrical solid bowl centrifuge ====
Conical-cylindrical bowl design was developed based on the conical and cylindrical bowl designs. This design is basically a combination of the best individual characteristics of the previous two designs, and therefore is a more advanced design. This particular design allows efficient dewatering ability, effective clarification, and fairly good classification within one unit. It has the ability to change and control the balance between the water removal and the centrate quality by the adjustment of its pool length, depending on the required product. Thus, conical-cylindrical bowl design is the most widely used in the industry today.

A typical conical-cylindrical solid bowl centrifuge design contains a rotating bowl unit connected to a conveyor with a gear system. The gear system allows the rotating bowl and the conveyor to rotate at different speeds but in the same direction. Commonly, the conveyor operates at the speed between 1900 and 2400 rotation per minute, while the bowl unit operates at 100 rotation per minute higher.

The performances of the shape designed centrifuge types can be seen in the table as follows:

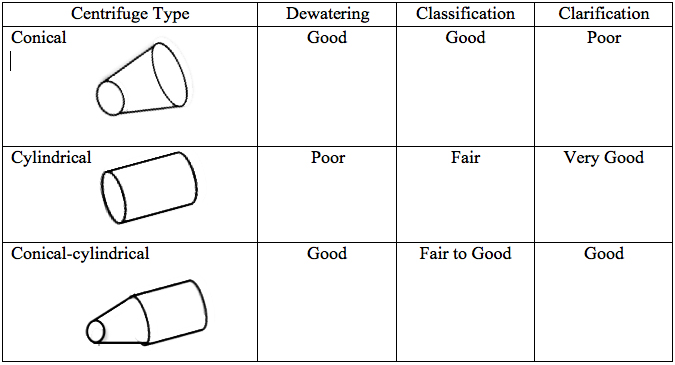
largethumb

Centrifuge types

==== Solid bowl centrifuge based on exit stream design ====
Based on the exit stream of the solid cake and liquid centrate, there are two types of solid bowl centrifuge designs, which are:

===== Concurrent design =====
For this design, the solid cake and the liquid centrate leave the centrifuge bowl at the same end.

===== Counter current design =====
This design allows the solid cake and the liquid centrate to leave the centrifuge bowl at opposite ends. For this design, the conveyor pushes the sludge towards the end streams and the supernatant liquid is allowed to exit over the weirs.

== Process characteristics ==
=== Process description ===
With the help of helical screw conveyor, solid bowl centrifuges separate two substances with different densities by the centrifugal force formed under fast rotation. Feed slurry enters the conveyor and is delivered into the rotating bowl through discharge ports. There is a slight speed difference between the rotation of conveyor and bowl, causing the solids to convey from the stationary zone where the wastewater is introduced to the bowl wall. By centrifugal force, the collected solids moves along the bowl wall, out of the pool and up the dewatering beach located at the tapered end of the bowl. At last the solids separated go to solid discharge while the liquids go to liquid discharge. The clarified liquid flows through the conveyor in the opposite direction through adjustable overflow parts.

=== Main process characteristics ===
Sources:

- Feed rate range is between 1.5-12 L/s (25-200 gal/min).
- Rotational speed is in the range of 1000-6000 rpm.
- Flow rate range is between 3.5-15 m3/(d KW) (0.5-2 gal/(min hp)).
- G factor (ratio of centrifugal force to gravitational force) is in the range of 2000-3000.
- Examples of common gearbox ratio used are 20, 40, 116, 130, and 140:1.
- Dewatering sludge is more effectively processed using centrifuges with larger pool volumes.
- Pool depth (radial height of liquid) can be changed in most centrifuges.
- Solid concentration range in the cake is between 4-6% in thickening operations, and 10- 35% in dewatering operations.
- The length to diameter ratio is between the range of 2.5:1 to 4:1 .
- The solid bowl centrifuge performance is determined by quality of the solids in the effluent and the cake dryness. However the centrifuge efficiency is usually measured by the percentage solid recovery with formula:

${Percentage\ of\ Solid\ Recovery} = \frac{solid\ in\ feed - solid\ in\ effluent} {solid\ in\ feed} \times {100\%}$

The table below shows the percentage of solid separation that has been achieved within different solids and cake solid formed while considering the effect of adding polymer:

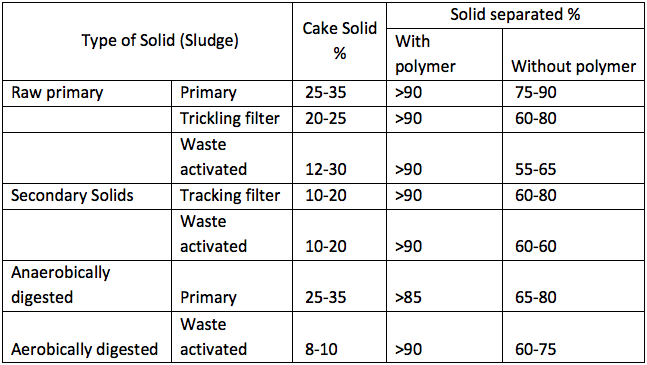
largethumb

Dewatering Performance

=== Assessment of the characteristics ===
- The length of the dewatering beach and the differential speed between the bowl and conveyor can affect the solid content of the separated solids. Optimum residence time of solids in the centrifuge and the water content of the separated solids can be achieved by adjusting the differential speed. High differential speed tends to increase the solid cake moisture and decrease solids in effluent as the residence time is lower. However, in some cases it is also possible that the solids in the effluent increases due to stirring effects.
- Sludges with a higher proportion of fine and hydrous particles are most likely to resist on being conveyed up to the solids discharge point. Heavier particles is preferred, therefore gravity thickening is used initially to treat most sludges along with the addition of organic polyelectrolytes.
- When the rotational speed in the bowl is higher, more solid separation occurs as the settling rate of solids increases with the square of the rotational speed. However, the maintenance cost increases proportionally with increasing rotational speed. The speed of centrifuge with a variable of speed drive motor can be adjusted while the machine is operating. Otherwise, the speed is fixed following the design of the motor and sheave sizes.
- Increasing flow rate reduces the residence time of the slurry in the bowl, causing a rise in the amount of solids in the effluent phase. Thus, the separation efficiency will decrease as a result. Moreover, the pool depth increases at the same time due to head that overflows the weir plates.
- The pool depth is controlled by the weir plates on the liquid end of the centrifuge. The pool volume and the residence time of slurry in the bowl are proportional to the pool depth. Lowering the depth pool decreases the centrifuge efficiency, reducing the g factor, and at the same time increasing the amount of solids in the effluent phase. Additionally, there is more area at the dewatering beach that is not covered by the pool which leads into a decrease in cake solid moisture.

== Heuristics ==
- The tested material is considered as an ideal material for the solid bowl centrifuge if the volume of solids and the volume of compaction come together within 90–120 seconds with a clear effluent.
- The spinning of difficult material may require higher G force, i.e. 2500 x G.
- If the settled solids are not transported out at a sufficient rate of pool, the bowl fills up with solids and no separation occurs.
- A longer retention time allows a higher solid recovery. It can be achieved by using a bowl of larger diameter while slowing down the machine rotation by maintaining the centrifugal force, and increasing the height of the liquid annulus in the centrifuge (pool depth).
- Centrifuges should be heated for four to five hours, and being held at a constant pressure, and then cooled down before the production can be started.
- 15-20 % solid will be present in the dewatered primary sludge when all of the settings follow all of the centrifuges characteristics.
- In general, total solid recovery without polymer addition is ranged from 74 – 84%.
- The effects of the process variables can be seen in the table below:

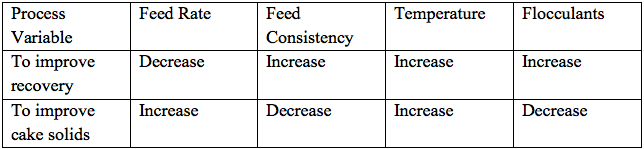
largethumb

Process Variables Effects
- In order to improve solid recovery, the machine variables can be controlled as follows:

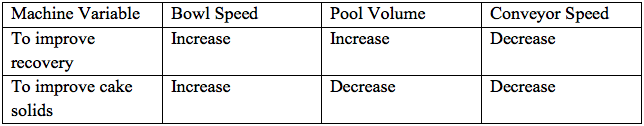
largethumb

Machine Variables Control to Improve Solid Recovery

== Production of waste stream ==
The post-treatment of the waste stream produced by the solid bowl centrifuge diverse depending on the industrial application. Since different industries have different feed for the centrifuge system, the waste stream will be different as well, and thus require different post treatments. Below are some examples of the waste stream production and its necessary post treatment in various applications in the industry.

=== Wastewater sludge treatment ===
In water treatment, the wanted product is the clean water, while the waste is the sludge containing dissolved organic and inorganic materials, fibrous matter, and extracellular polymer (ECP). The sludge is commonly discarded down the sewer or to landfill. Occasionally, the sludge is used in the production of bricks and concrete, in agriculture as a soil additive, or for land reclamation. In this application, solid bowl centrifuge is used as the final step of the water treatment sludge before disposal in order to reduce landfill charges and transport costs.

=== Coal treatment underflow slurry ===
Solid-bowl centrifuge is used for dewatering the coal waste slurry along with plate-and-frame filter press in coal manufacturing to dewater the slurry before being disposed of. The slurry feed was attained from the underflow of a functioning bituminous coal-cleaning thickener device. As for the waste stream, it is usually disposed of into slurry cells or deserted underground mine site if available, or more commonly in slurry impoundments.

=== Polymer manufacture ===
In this industry, acetate is recovered during the manufacturing of polymers. In this case, the wanted product is actually the polymer; however, the acetate is not a waste either since it is recovered. While the polymer solids are discharged through the solid exit port and further processed, the acetate that is recovered through the liquid exit port and further separated from the washing liquid to recover pure acetate.

== New development ==
There are various aspects that can be improved from the current solid bowl centrifuges in order to increase its performance and reliability. To allow more control and simpler operation, support systems such as feed equipment, chemical dosing facility and better transfer pumps were designed and added. Moreover, the operating parameters can be adjusted to optimize the sludge dewatering process. It relies on rotational force in order to throw the solids out and for the sludge to stick to the outer all surfaces. The use of a metal screen or some suitable filtering material can also be added to achieve better solids dryness.
