= VINE-seq =

Genomics Technique

VINE-seq (Vessel Isolation and Nuclei Extraction for Sequencing) is a method to isolate and molecularly characterize the vascular and perivascular cells of the human brain microvessels at single-nuclei resolution. This technique is achieved by combining various known laboratory-based strategies involving the mechanical dissociation of brain tissue samples into single cells, density gradient centrifugation and filtration to isolate nuclei of microvessels, fluorescence-activated cell sorting (FACs) of cellular populations and droplet-based single-nuclei RNA sequencing (drop-snRNA-seq). Altogether, this generates a single-nuclei transcriptomic profile of the various cell types present in the vasculature of the brain. Through processing and analyzing the single-nuclei transcriptomic data, the heterogeneity within and between cell types can be distinguished to construct the molecular landscape of the human brain vasculature that was not previously done before.

== Background ==
A central feature of brain health is the maintenance of the complex vasculature that functions to transport essential metabolites, oxygen, nutrients and wastes to and from the human brain. Disruption of the vasculature can lead to neurological disorders such as Alzheimer's disease and stroke. The vasculature is home to a heterogeneous group of cell types including but not limited to the endothelial cells, pericytes, astrocytes, and leukocytes. Although there have been many attempts to understand the cellular diversity in the vasculature over the years, methodological and technological limitations have hindered our ability to decode the complex entity of the brain. Therefore, our treatment options for neurological disorders have been inadequate due to our incomplete characterization of the vascular and perivascular cells in this complex environment. Through recent advances in single-cell RNA sequencing (scRNA-seq), the molecular atlas of the brain vasculature in mice has been decoded and the heterogeneous nature within the cell types found in the human brain have been slowly uncovered. Despite these achievements, murine brain vasculature may not fully recapitulate the human brain vasculature leading to concerns of translational potential. Additionally, many previous studies focusing on scRNA-seq of the human brain did not characterize the cellular heterogeneity in the vasculature. By introducing a novel method called VINE-seq, a research group derived a method to isolate intact nuclei from the microvessels of the brain. To accomplish this, they had to overcome the challenge of removing the extracellular matrix (ECM) that surrounds the microvessels without damaging the nuclei. By using VINE-seq on frozen brain tissues from the hippocampus and cortex, they provided the first characterization of the various cell types in the human brain vasculature at single-nuclei resolution.

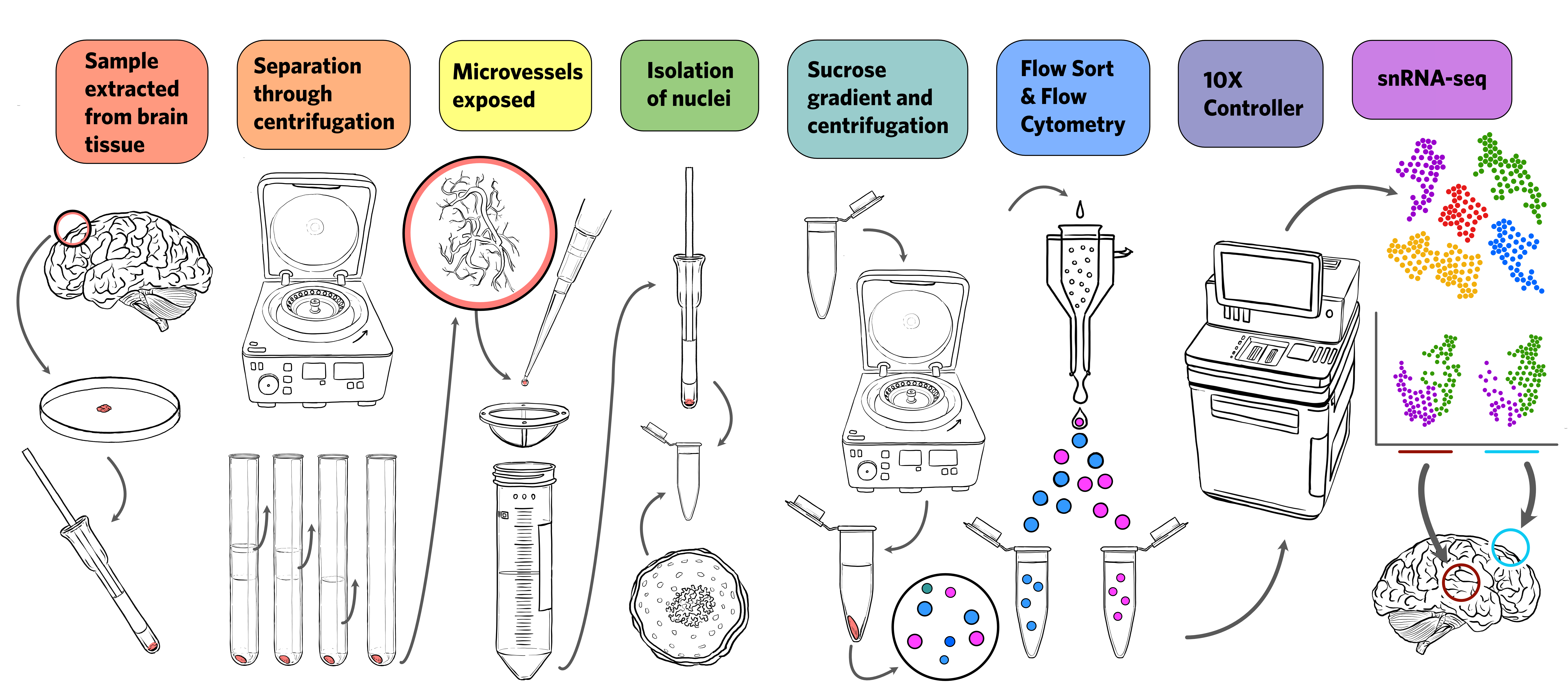
An illustration of the methodology of VINE-seq

== Methodology ==
VINE-Seq is a novel method to detail the vasculature of the human brain. It uses a combination of laboratory methods with single-nucleotide transcriptomics in order to compose an atlas of the vascular and perivascular cell types within the brain. The following steps detail the basis of the VINE-Seq protocol:

1. The initial portion of the protocol consists of methodology adapted from splenocyte isolation and sample clean-up. For VINE-Seq, human brain tissue is initially extracted post-mortem. The researchers extracted brain tissue from the hippocampus and the superior frontal cortex.
2. Tissue samples are homogenized until completely blended and no visible tissue remains. Samples are mixed with 32% Dextran solution in HBSS. Centrifugation is performed at 4,400g for 20 minutes in order to separate cellular layers with a pellet containing the condensed vasculature. The remaining layers of myelin and parenchymal cells are aspirated without disturbing the pellet.
3. Pellets are resuspended in a Dextran solution. A series of washes with PBS is performed to further decontaminate the pellet from cellular debris. The microvessels are exposed and the remaining cellular debris is removed.
4. A method designed to extract mouse splenocytes was adapted and performed to help isolate the nuclei from the remaining vascular cells. Centrifugation at 500g for 10 minutes is performed to separate vascular cells from nuclei and are resuspended in a solution of lysis buffer, RNase inhibitor, and EDTA-free protease inhibitor. The nuclei are then homogenized using glass douncers. The samples are pelleted once more via centrifugation.
5. The remaining cellular debris and byproducts are depleted using a sucrose gradient wash and fluorescence-activated cell sorting (FACS). The pellets are purified to help yield high-quality data.
6. Flow cytometry is used for the remaining nuclei. This technique is used to determine the physical and chemical properties of the vascular nuclei.
7. Laboratory runs of flow cytometry overestimated from expected values by 3.4 times. In response, the researchers isolated and sorted more nuclei to obtain around 10,000 nuclei per sample. After flow sorting, 10,000 nuclei per sample are required to perform droplet-based snRNA-seq libraries.
8. Droplet-based snRNA-seq libraries are prepared for sequencing. Adequate cDNA is obtained after 15 cycles of PCR. The researchers successfully sequenced vascular nuclei on S4 lanes on a NovaSeq 6000.

== Applications ==
=== Brain mapping ===
Through their experimentation and transcriptomic analysis, the authors and creators of VINE-Seq discovered that the series of methods were able to elucidate the transcriptomic expression of the vascular endothelial and smooth muscle cells present in the arteriovenous organization in healthy human brain tissue. Additionally, VINE-seq was able to capture two novel subpopulations of pericytes called matrix pericytes and transport pericytes that may be involved in ECM modulation and transmembrane transportation, respectively.

=== Alzheimer's disease ===
Using VINE-seq, these researchers were able to help uncover the molecular basis of the human brain vasculature in Alzheimer's disease (AD). They showed that AD-associated genes were highly expressed in the vascular cell types and that there are gene expression alterations or loss of abundance of endothelial cells, smooth muscle cells and perivascular fibroblasts cells in AD brain samples compared to normal brain samples.

=== Further applications ===
VINE-Seq was originally designed to map out the vasculature of the human brain, as no molecular map currently exists. Ever since the pre-print of the paper introducing VINE-seq was available in 2021, the molecular map has been recognized for its contribution in expanding our knowledge of the brain vasculature which will allow for more in-depth studies of brain diseases and potentially overcoming the challenge of drug delivery to the brain. Some applications of the data generated by VINE-seq have contributed to furthering our knowledge in the pathogenesis of AD, dementia, ischemic stroke, and the effects of severe COVID-19 on the brain.

== Advantages and disadvantages ==
=== Advantages ===
- Isolates more cerebrovascular nuclei than previous single-nuclei isolation techniques
- Captures rarer cells in the vasculature due to better isolation of nuclei
- Minimizes the effect of altering gene expression by avoiding enzymatic dissociation
- Applicable to frozen archived brain tissue

=== Disadvantages ===
- Characterization of cell types is limited to known nuclear markers
- Loss of cytoplasmic transcriptomic information through isolation of the nuclei
- Potential leak from nuclear pores of RNA, thus losing some crucial RNA transcripts
