= Analytical band centrifugation =

Centrifuge procedure typically used for quality control

Figure comparing an idealized time series from band ultracentrifugation and boundary ultracentrifugation experiments.

Analytical band centrifugation (ABC) (also known as analytical band ultracentrifugation, or band sedimentation-velocity), is a specialized ultracentrifugation procedure, where unlike the typical use of (boundary) sedimentation velocity analytical ultracentrifugation (SV-AUC) wherein a homogenous bulk solution is centrifuged, in ABC a thin (~15 μL, ~500 μm) sample is layered on top of a bulk solvent and then centrifuged. The method is distinguished from zone-sedimentation in that a stabilizing density gradient is self-generated during centrifugation, through the use of a higher density (than the sample) bulk "binary solvent", containing both a solvent (i.e. H_{2}O), and a second component (small molecules, i.e. CsCl) that will sediment to form a stabilizing density gradient for the sample.

ABC also requires specially designed analytical ultracentrifuge cells, as the sample is not manually applied by pipette but instead automatically delivered via capillary under low g-forces at the beginning of a run from a reservoir within the cell. It was first demonstrated in 1963, and was not commonly used for many decades, but recently has become more widely used due to its applicability to quality control measurements on therapeutic viruses such as adeno-associated viruses (AAVs). The profiles resulting from ABC analyses are similar in their interpretation to the profiles from electrophoretic separations ("electropherograms"), and thus have been dubbed "centrifugrams".

== See also ==
- Svedberg
- Sedimentation
- Centrifugation
- Differential centrifugation
