= Laboratory centrifuge =

Equipment to spin liquid samples at high speed

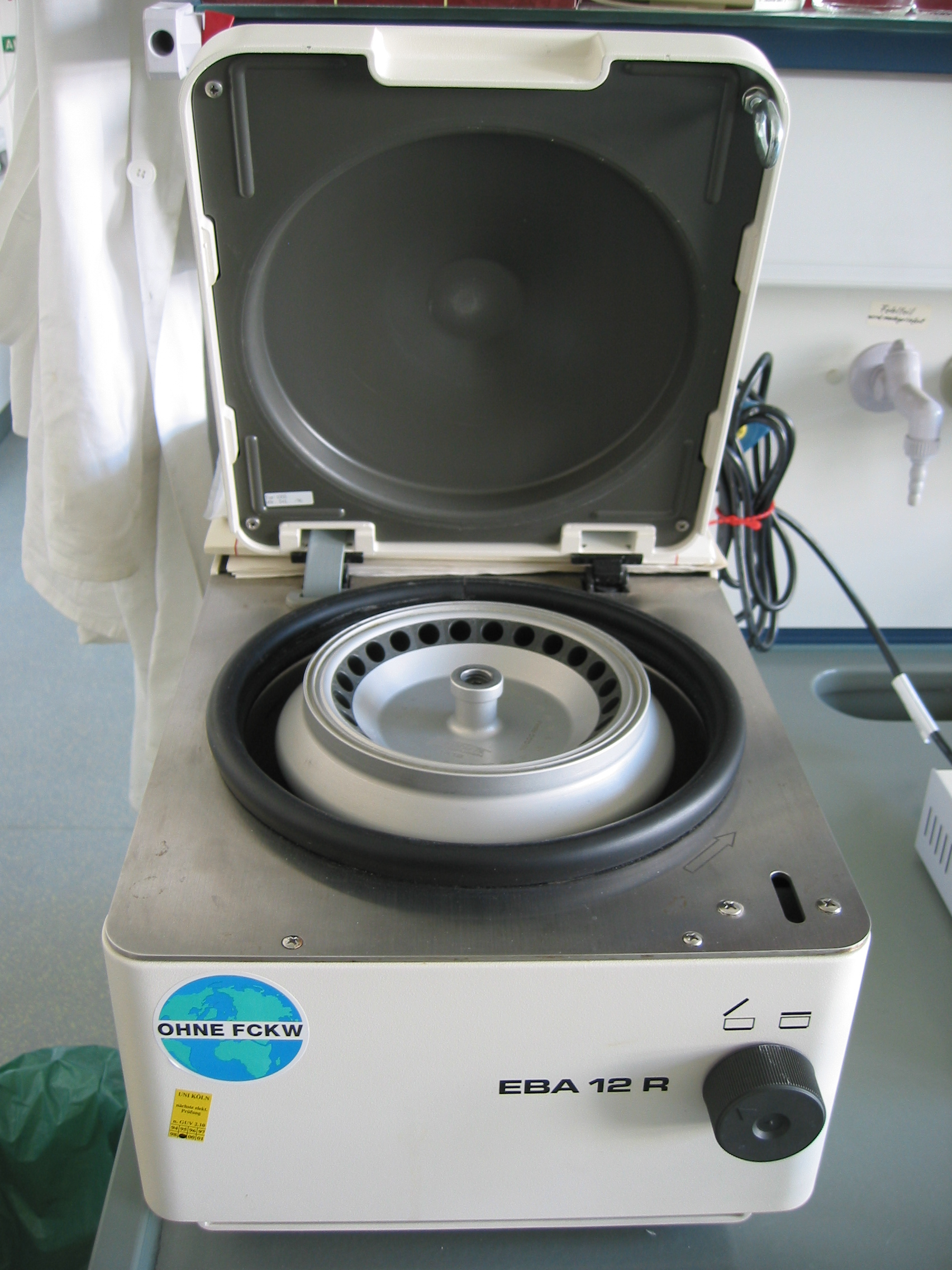
- A Hettich tabletop laboratory centrifuge
- Uses: Separation
- Related items: Gas centrifuge Ultracentrifuge

A laboratory centrifuge is a piece of laboratory equipment, driven by a motor, which spins liquid samples at high speed. There are various types of centrifuges, depending on the size and the sample capacity.

Like all other centrifuges, laboratory centrifuges work by the sedimentation principle, where the centripetal acceleration is used to separate substances of greater and lesser density.

== Types ==
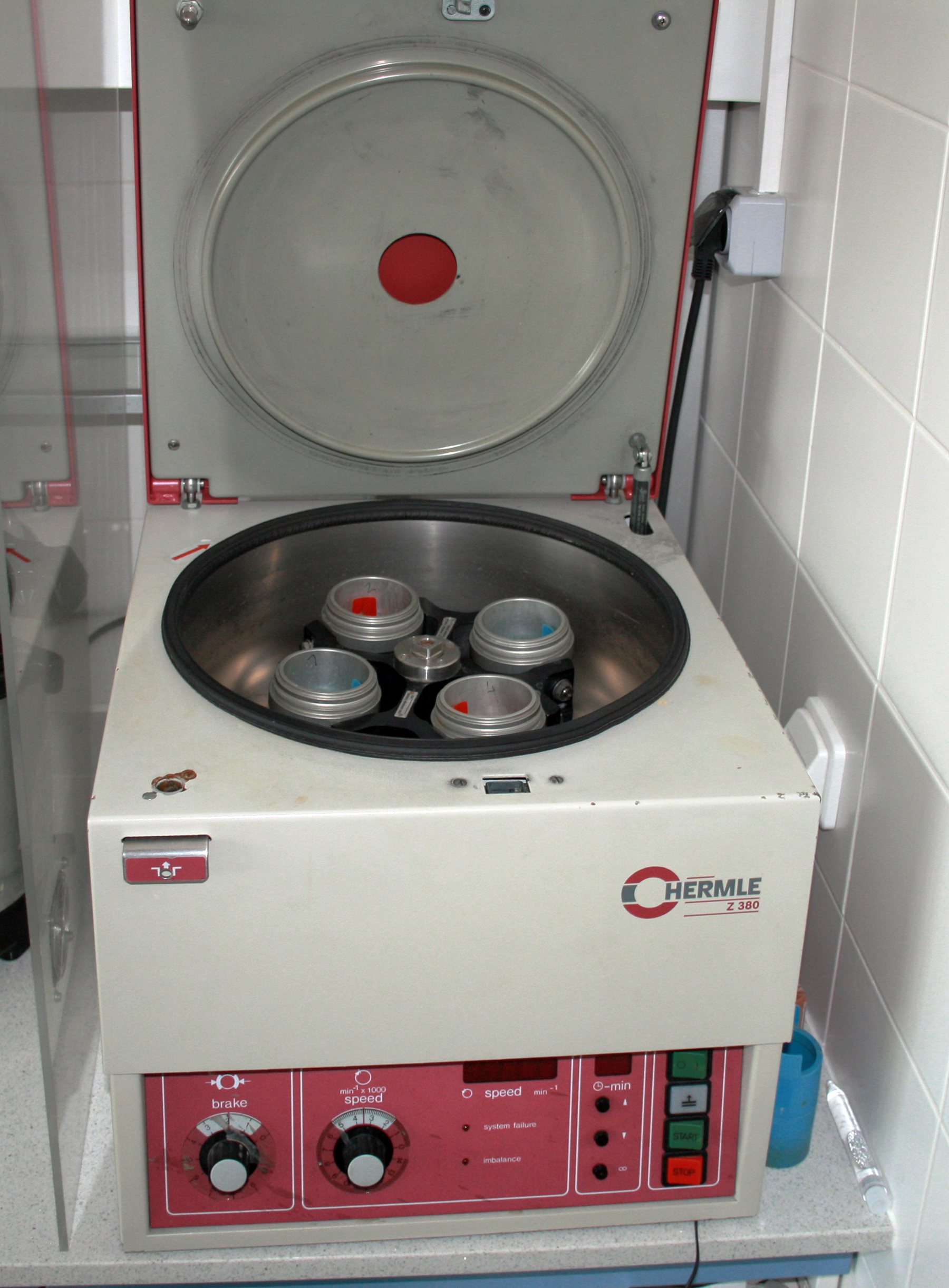
Laboratory centrifuge

There are various types of centrifugation:

- Differential centrifugation, often used to separate certain organelles from whole cells for further analysis of specific parts of cells
- Isopycnic centrifugation, often used to isolate nucleic acids such as DNA
- Sucrose gradient centrifugation, often used to purify enveloped viruses and ribosomes, and also to separate cell organelles from crude cellular extracts

There are different types of laboratory centrifuges:

Microcentrifuges
devices for small tubes from 0.2 ml to 2.0 ml (micro tubes), up to 96 well-plates, compact design, small footprint; up to 30,000 g
Clinical centrifuges
moderate-speed devices used for clinical applications like blood collection tubes
Multipurpose high-speed centrifuges
devices for a broad range of tube sizes, high variability, big footprint
Ultracentrifuges
analytical and preparative models

Because of the heat generated by air friction (even in ultracentrifuges, where the rotor operates in a good vacuum), and the frequent necessity of maintaining samples at a given temperature, many types of laboratory centrifuges are refrigerated and temperature regulated.

== Centrifuge tubes ==
Centrifuge tubes are precision-made, high-strength tubes of glass or plastic made to fit exactly in rotor cavities. They may vary in capacity from 50 mL down to much smaller capacities used in microcentrifuges used extensively in molecular biology laboratories. Microcentrifuges typically accommodate disposable plastic microcentrifuge tubes with capacities from 250 μL to 2.0 mL.

Glass centrifuge tubes can be used with most solvents, but tend to be more expensive. They can be cleaned like other laboratory glassware, and can be sterilized by autoclaving. Small scratches from careless handling can cause failure under the strong forces imposed during a run. Glass tubes are inserted into soft rubber sleeves to cushion them during runs. Plastic centrifuge tubes, especially tend to be less expensive and, with care, can be just as durable as glass. Water is preferred when plastic centrifuge tubes are used. They are more difficult to clean thoroughly, and are usually inexpensive enough to be considered disposable.

Disposable plastic "microlitre tubes" of 0.5ml to 2ml are commonly used in microcentrifuges. They are molded from a flexible transparent plastic similar to polythene, are semi-conical in shape, with integral, hinged sealing caps.

Larger samples are spun using centrifuge bottles, which range in capacity from 250 to 1000 millilitres. Although some are made of heavy glass, centrifuge bottles are usually made of shatterproof plastics such as polypropylene or polycarbonate. Sealing closures may be used for added leak-proof assurance.

== Safety ==
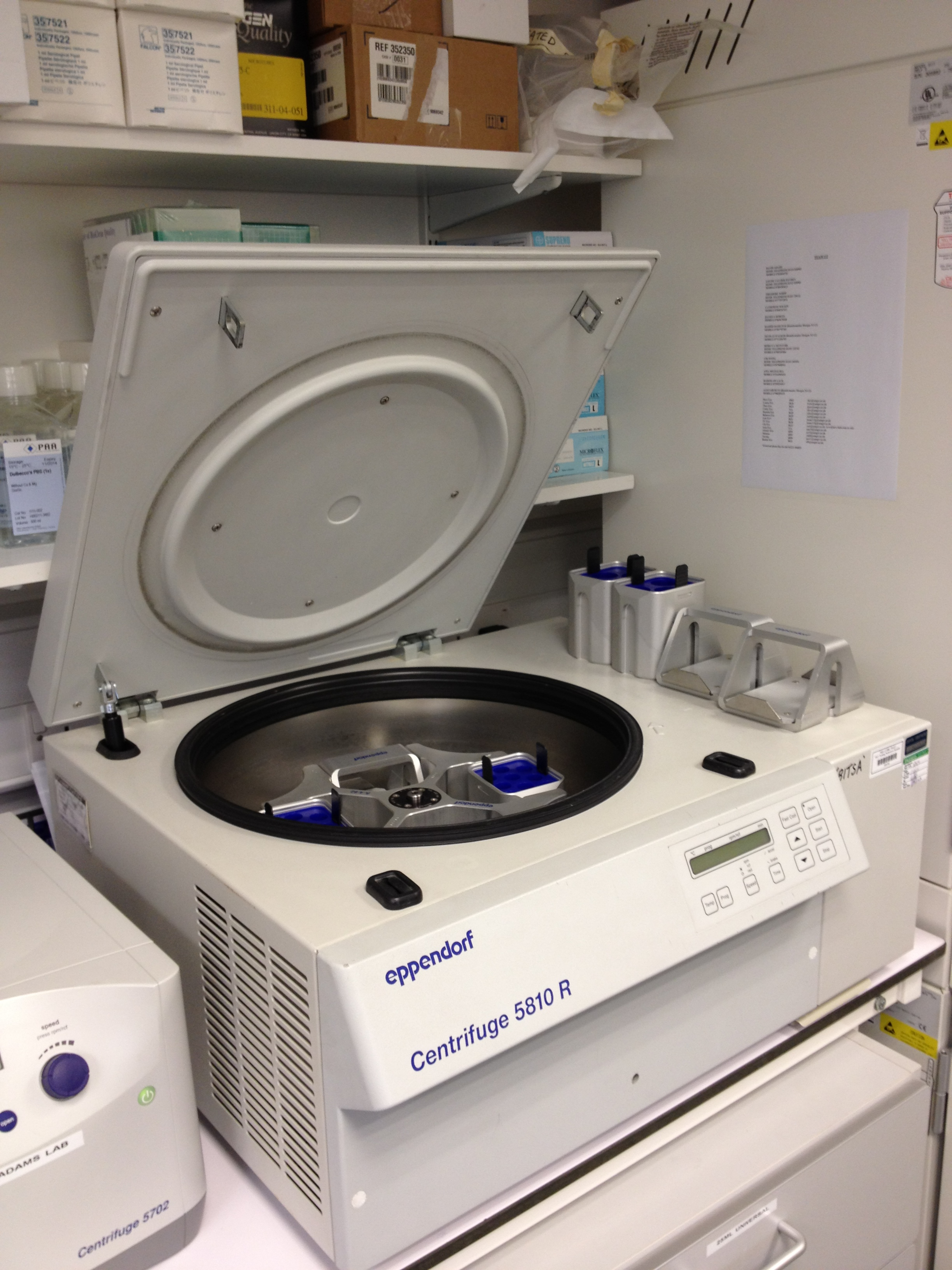
An Eppendorf laboratory centrifuge

The load in a laboratory centrifuge must be carefully balanced. This is achieved by using a combination of samples and balance tubes which all have the same weight or by using various balancing patterns without balance tubes. It is an interesting mathematical problem to solve the balance pattern given n slots and k tubes with the same weight. It is known that the solution exists if and only if both k and n-k can be expressed as a sum of prime factors of n. Small differences in mass of the load can result in a large force imbalance when the rotor is at high speed. This force imbalance strains the spindle and may result in damage to the centrifuge or personal injury. Some centrifuges have an automatic rotor imbalance detection feature that immediately discontinues the run when an imbalance is detected.

Before starting a centrifuge, an accurate check of the rotor and lid locking mechanisms is mandatory. A spinning rotor can cause serious injury if touched. Modern centrifuges generally have features that prevent accidental contact with a moving rotor as the main lid is locked during the run.

Centrifuge rotors have tremendous kinetic energy during high speed rotation. Rotor failure, caused by mechanical stress from the high forces imparted by the motor, can occur due to manufacturing defects, routine wear and tear, or improper use and maintenance. Such a failure can be catastrophic failure, especially with larger centrifuges, and generally results in total destruction of the centrifuge. While centrifuges generally have safety shielding to contain these failures, such shielding may be inadequate, especially in older models, or the entire centrifuge unit may be propelled from its position, resulting in damage to nearby personnel and equipment. Uncontained rotor failures have shattered laboratory windows and destroyed refrigerators and cabinetry. To reduce the risk of rotor failures, centrifuge manufacturers specify operating and maintenance procedures to ensure that rotors are regularly inspected and removed from service or derated (only operated at lower speeds) when they are past their expected lifetime.

Another potential hazard is the aerosolization of hazardous samples during centrifugation. To prevent contamination of the laboratory, rotor lids with special aerosol-tight gaskets are available. The rotor can be loaded with the samples within a hood and the rotor lid fixed on the rotor. Afterwards, the aerosol-tight system of rotor and lid is transferred to the centrifuge. The rotor can then be fixed within the centrifuge without opening the lid. After the run, the entire rotor assembly, including the lid, is removed from the centrifuge to the hood for further steps, maintaining the samples within a closed system.

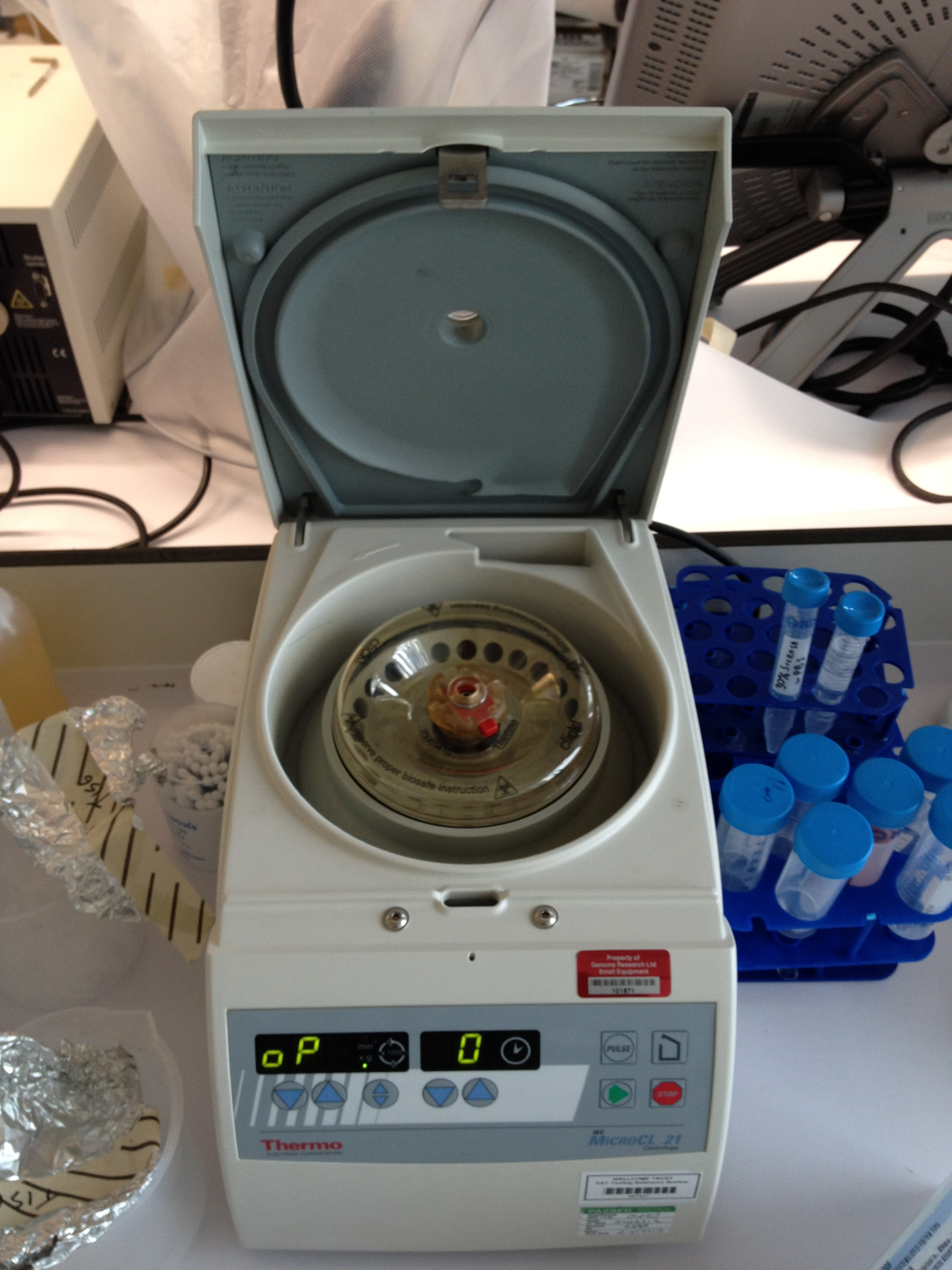
A ThermoFisher laboratory bench-top centrifuge.

== See also ==
- Ultracentrifuge
- Separation
- Cytocentrifuge
