= Rate-zonal centrifugation =

Rate-zonal centrifugation is a centrifugation technique employed to effectively separate particles of different sizes. The tube is first filled with different concentrations of sucrose or another solute establishing layers with different densities and viscosities, forming a density gradient, within which the particles to be separated are added. The larger particles will be able to travel to the bottom layer because they are more massive. The greater mass allows the particles to travel through layers with a greater viscosity, while the smaller particles will remain at the top, as they lack the mass to travel through the more viscous layers. Once the centrifugation is over, fractions are collected.
