= Cell fractionation =

Separating components of a cell while preserving their functions

In cell biology, cell fractionation is the process used to separate cellular components while preserving individual functions of each component. This is a method that was originally used to demonstrate the cellular location of various biochemical processes. Other uses of subcellular fractionation is to provide an enriched source of a protein for further purification, and facilitate the diagnosis of various disease states.

== Homogenization ==
Tissue is typically homogenized in a buffer solution that is isotonic to stop osmotic damage. Mechanisms for homogenization include grinding, mincing, chopping, pressure changes, osmotic shock, freeze-thawing, and ultrasound. The samples are then kept cold to prevent enzymatic damage. It is the formation of homogenous mass of cells (cell homogenate or cell suspension). It involves grinding of cells in a suitable medium in the presence of certain enzymes with correct pH, ionic composition, and temperature. For example, pectinase which digests middle lamella among plant cells.

== Filtration ==
This step may not be necessary depending on the source of the cells. Animal tissue however is likely to yield connective tissue which must be removed. Commonly, filtration is achieved either by pouring through gauze or with a suction filter and the relevant grade ceramic filter.

== Purification ==
Purification is achieved by differential centrifugation – the sequential increase in gravitational force results in the sequential separation of organelles according to their density.

== See also ==
- Cell disruption

Media for cell separation by density:

- Percoll
- Ficoll
