= Lysosome =

Cell membrane organelle

Cell biology
- Animal cell diagram
- Components of a typical animal cell: 1. Nucleolus; 2. Nucleus; 3. Ribosome (dots as part of 5); 4. Vesicle; 5. Rough endoplasmic reticulum 6. Golgi apparatus (or, Golgi body); 7. Cytoskeleton; 8. Smooth endoplasmic reticulum 9. Mitochondrion; 10. Vacuole; 11. Cytosol (fluid that contains organelles; with which, comprises cytoplasm); 12. Lysosome; 13. Centrosome; 14. Cell membrane

A lysosome (/ˈlaɪsəˌsoʊm/) is a membrane-bound organelle that is found in all animal cells (except red blood cells), and rarely in plant cells. There are normally hundreds of lysosomes in the cytosol, where they function as the cell's degradation center. Their primary responsibility is for catabolic degradation of proteins, polysaccharides and lipids into their respective building-block molecules: amino acids, monosaccharides, and free fatty acids. The breakdown is done by various enzymes, for example proteases, glycosidases and lipases.

With an acidic lumen limited by a single-bilayer lipid membrane, the lysosome holds an environment isolated from the rest of the cell. The lower pH creates optimal conditions for the over 60 different hydrolases inside.

Lysosomes receive extracellular particles through endocytosis, and intracellular components through autophagy. They can also fuse with the plasma membrane and secrete their contents, a process called lysosomal exocytosis. After degradation, lysosomal products are transported out of the lysosome through specific membrane proteins or via vesicular membrane trafficking to be recycled or to be utilized for energy.

Aside from cellular clearance and secretion, lysosomes mediate biological processes like plasma membrane repair, cell homeostasis, energy metabolism, cell signaling, and the immune response.

== Discovery ==
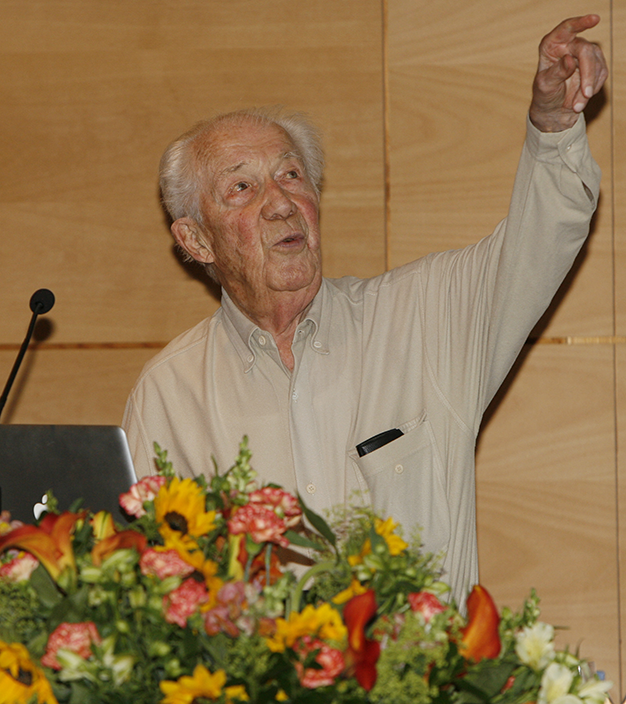
Christian de Duve, age 95, presenting his ideas on the origin of the eukaryotic cell (October 2012)

Christian de Duve, a Belgian scientist at the Laboratory of Physiological Chemistry at the Catholic University of Louvain, is credited with discovering lysosomes in the 1950s. De Duve and his team were studying the distribution of hydrolytic enzymes such as acid phosphatase within cells, using cell fractionation methods to isolate subcellular components. De Duve and his team identified an unknown organelle that was rich in acid phosphatase. This led them to propose the existence of lysosomes as membrane bound organelles containing digestive enzymes capable of breaking down a variety of biological molecules.

Using differential centrifugation and enzyme activity assays, the team confirmed the hypothesis and understood that these organelles play a crucial role in intracellular digestion processes, such as phagocytosis and autophagy. The presence of digestive enzymes was further validated using electron microscopy. De Duve's discovery laid the foundation for new research into lysosomal functions and understanding disorders which could lead to undigested materials accumulating in the cell. De Duve was awarded the Nobel Prize in Physiology or Medicine in 1974.

== Function and structure ==
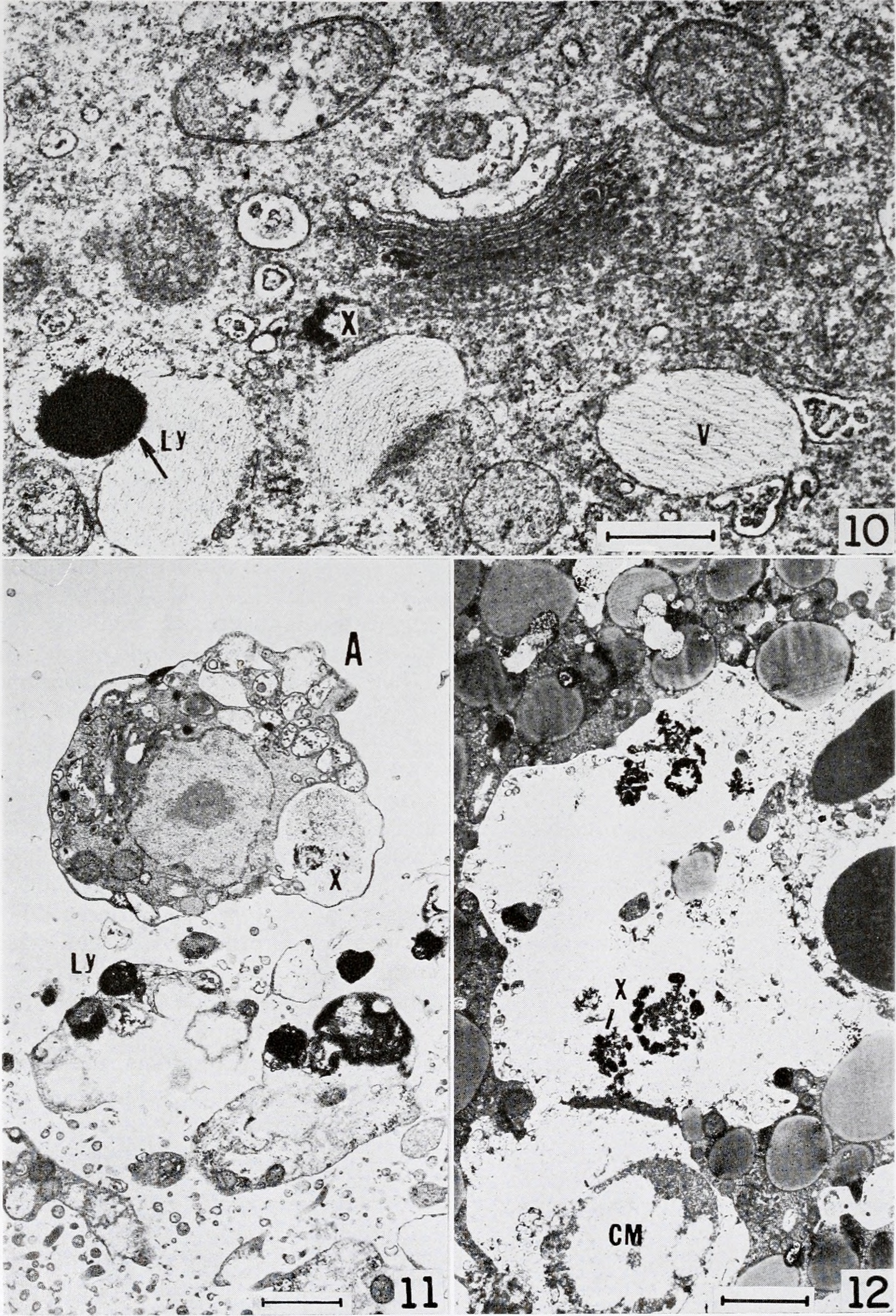
TEM views of various vesicular compartments. Lysosomes are denoted by "Ly". They are dyed dark due to their acidity; in the center of the top image, a Golgi Apparatus can be seen, distal from the cell membrane relative to the lysosome.

Lysosomes vary in shape and size depending on their state, what they are digesting, and the cell type they are in. Their shape can differ from spherical and ovoid to occasionally tubular. The size of lysosomes ranges 0.1–1.2 μm, with some tubular ones reaching up to 15 μm in phagocytes. Several hundred lysosomes can be found within a single cell. However, upon nutrient deprivation or induced autophagy, their numbers can drop below 50 in a cell.

Lysosomes contain a variety of enzymes that enable the cell to break down various biomolecules it engulfs, including peptides, nucleic acids, carbohydrates, and lipids. The enzymes responsible for this hydrolysis require an acidic environment for optimal activity, with a pH ranging from ~4.5–5.0. The interior of the lysosome is acidic compared to the slightly basic cytosol (pH 7.2).

The lysosomal membrane is a phospholipid bilayer with high carbohydrate content from heavily glycosylated membrane proteins. This forms a glycocalyx that protects the cell from the degradative enzymes held within the lysosome. Lysosomal hydrolases are pH-sensitive and do not function properly in the alkaline environment of the cytosol, ensuring that molecules and organelles in the cytosol are not degraded if there is leakage of hydrolytic enzymes from the lysosome.

In addition to breaking down polymers, lysosomes are capable of killing and digesting microbes, cells, or cellular debris. Through cooperation with phagosomes, lysosomes conduct autophagy, clearing out damaged structures and forming simple compounds, which are then used as new building materials. Similarly, lysosomes break down virus particles or bacteria during phagocytosis in macrophages.

Lysosomes also help detect pathogens through toll-like receptors (TLRs), like TLR7 and TLR9. Microbes can be degraded into antigens, which are then loaded onto MHC molecules and presented to T-cells, a critical part of immune defense. Additionally, lysosomal enzymes can trigger lysosomal-mediated programmed cell death (LM-PCD) if released into the cytoplasm.

To maintain their acidic environment, lysosomes pump protons (H⁺ ions) from mitochondria into the lysosomal lumen via a proton pump in the lysosomal membrane. Vacuolar-ATPases are responsible for the transport of protons, while the counter transport of chloride ions is performed by ClC-7 Cl⁻/H⁺ antiporter. This mechanism helps maintain a steady acidic environment, as well as ionic homeostasis, within the lysosome.

Lysosomes also help balance cellular metabolism by sensing nutrient availability. When nutrients are plentiful, they activate mTOR signaling to support anabolic (biosynthetic) processes. During starvation, lysosomes degrade autophagic material, recycling components to maintain cell survival.

== Lysosomal degradation pathways ==
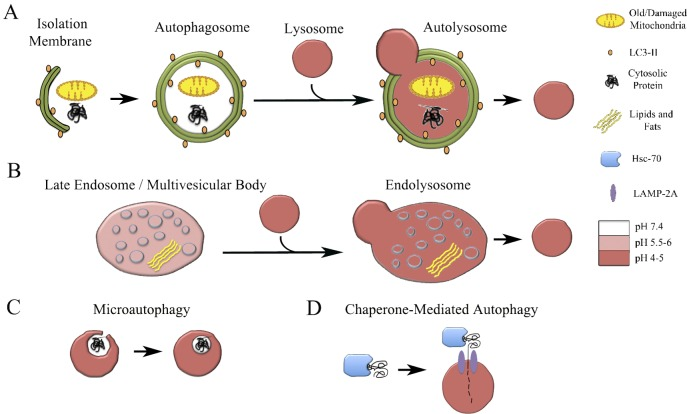
Cellular material is delivered to lysosomes in four different ways: (A) Macroautophagy, (B) Endosomal degradation, (C) Microautophagy and (D) Chaperone-mediated autophagy (CMA).

The lysosome is delivered material for degradation via transient interactions or complete fusion, forming endolysosomes and autolysosomes respectively. This way, the lysosomes act as reservoirs for acidic hydrolases, cycling through fusion and fission events with late endosomes and autophagosomes. The actual breakdown of endocytic and autophagic cargo primarily happens within these transient structures—endolysosomes and autolysosomes—under normal physiological conditions.

Endocytosed materials—such as complex lipids, membrane proteins, and polysaccharides—enter the endocytic pathway; moving first in early endosomes, then in late endosomes containing intraluminal vesicles (also referred to as multivesicular bodies, MVBs). Then they interact with lysosomes, either via full fusion, or via "kiss-and-run" events where brief membrane contact allows content exchange before the organelles separate. The resulting hybrid structure is called an endolysosome.

Intracellular materials—like damaged organelles or misfolded proteins—are processed through the autophagic pathway. Autophagy, or "self-eating," is a continuous cellular process that delivers cytosolic components to lysosomes for degradation. There are three main types of autophagy: macroautophagy, microautophagy, and chaperone-mediated autophagy (CMA)—each differing in how cargo is delivered to the lysosome. After merging with lysosomes they create hybrid organelles called autolysosomes.

- Macroautophagy involves the formation of isolated double- or multi-membranes that encapsulate portions of cytosolic material such as misfolded- or polyubiquitinated proteins, lipids, damaged or aged organelles, RNA, and fragments of the ER. These vesicles mature into autophagosomes and then fuse with lysosomes for degradation, creating an autolysosome. A key marker of autophagosomes is LC3-II, a lipidated form of microtubule-associated protein light chain 3 (MAP-LC3) that appears early in the process and is broken down during digestion
- Microautophagy bypasses vesicle formation altogether, with lysosomes directly engulfing surrounding cytosolic material through membrane invagination; pinocytosis. This process is similar to the formation of intraluminal vesicles in MVBs.
- Chaperone-mediated autophagy (CMA) selectively degrades proteins that contain a KFERQ motif. These substrates are recognized by Hsc70, which binds them and delivers them to lysosomes via the receptor LAMP-2A for degradation.

The resulting catabolites (i.e., products of catabolism) serve as building-block molecules for synthesizing complex macromolecules. These are exported from lysosomes via specific transporters or through vesicle trafficking. Once released into the cytosol or delivered to the Golgi apparatus, these catabolites are either further metabolized to generate energy or reused in biosynthetic pathways to form new complex molecules. Alternatively, some degradation products can be secreted out of the lysosomes through exocytosis.

Because catabolic (degradative) and anabolic (biosynthetic) pathways are interconnected and tightly regulated, the flow of cargo through the endocytic and autophagic systems is modulated by cellular signaling and nutrient availability. Nutrient deprivation, for example, activates autophagy, which is then halted once lysosomal degradation is complete. Lysosomes themselves play a direct role in sensing nutrient levels through the lysosomal nutrient-sensing (LYNUS) system, which includes components such as V-ATPase, Rag GTPases, and the mTOR complex.

== Formation ==
Process of phagocytosis: 1. A particle is ingested by a phagocyte after antigens are recognized which results in the formation of a phagosome. 2. The fusion of lysosomes with the phagosome creates a phagolysosome. The particle is broken down by the digestive enzymes found in the lysosomes.

The formation of lysosomes begins in the endoplasmic reticulum, where hydrolytic enzymes are synthesized. These enzymes are then transported to the Golgi apparatus (Golgi body), where they undergo modifications to ensure proper targeting and function. The enzymes are tagged with mannose-6-phosphate, allowing them to be sorted into vesicles. These vesicles then bud off from the trans-Golgi network and fuse with early endosomes.

Early endosomes degrade cargo from the extracellular environment, and as they mature into late endosomes, proton pumps are activated, causing the internal environment to become acidic. This acidic environment activates the hydrolytic enzymes, which further mature the endosome into a lysosome. The lysosome then breaks down and recycles cellular waste.

Disruptions in lysosomal formation can lead to dysfunctional lysosomes and the accumulation of undigested molecules, contributing to various lysosomal storage disorders.

== Pathogen entry ==
Lysosomes are a crucial component of the innate immune system and play an important role in defending the cell against pathogens such as viruses or bacteria. When a pathogen enters the cell, it is often enclosed in a phagosome, which then fuses with a lysosome to form a phagolysosome where the hydrolytic enzymes break down the pathogen.

Lysosomes also play a big role in the adaptive immune system. Fragments of pathogens that have been broken down by phagolysosomes are sent to the major histocompatibility complex class II (MHC II) and presented on the surface of antigen presenting cells (APCs). This then activates helper T cells, which causes an adaptive immune response.

Just like other pathogens, viruses entering the cell via endocytosis are degraded in lysosomes. However, some viruses have evolved strategies to escape degradation by lysosomes, and are able to escape the lysosome before complete degradation and spread viral material into the cytoplasm which then spreads viral infection in the cell. Poor lysosomal activity and failure by lysosomes to properly degrade all biomolecules from pathogens results in higher viral infections by viruses such as HIV.

== Clinical significance ==
Lysosomal storage disorders are a group of metabolic disorders that stem from inherited genetic mutations that disrupt normal lysosomal function and homeostasis. Most frequently, the mutations are located in the acidic hydrolases, but can also be found in non-enzymatic lysosomal proteins (soluble and membrane-bound) and non-lysosomal factors controlling lysosomal function. This leads to defective degradation, which induces abnormal accumulations of undigested or partially digested macromolecules within lysosomes. Lysosomal dysfunction also affects transport across the lysosomal membrane, vesicle trafficking, lysosome reformation and autophagy.

The stress of accumulated lysosomal substrates can lead to lysosomal membrane permeabilization, allowing hydrolytic enzymes to leak into the cytosol and initiate cell death. This cell loss particularly affects post-mitotic tissues such as the brain, liver, eyes, muscles, and spleen—resulting in the hallmark symptoms of lysosomal storage disorders, including neurodegeneration, cognitive impairment, and motor dysfunction.

The age of onset and the specific symptoms in lysosomal storage disorders differ depending on the severity of the mutations, the cell types affected and what substrates accumulate. However, the clinical presentation is typically a neurodegenerative disease at childhood, with more variations presenting themselves in adulthood. In most cases, the central nervous system (CNS) is affected, causing the brain to experience global neurodegeneration, inflammation, activation of the innate immune system and astrogliosis.

Several therapeutic strategies have been developed to address lysosomal storage disorders. These include substrate reduction therapy, bone marrow transplantation, gene therapy, and enzyme replacement therapy. Currently, enzyme replacement therapy and substrate reduction are the most widely used. However, despite these advancements, most lysosomal storage disorders still lack effective treatments as the existing ones are limited by poor efficacy and are typically disease specific.

=== Lysosomotropism ===
Lysosomotropism refers to the tendency of lipophilic weak bases to accumulate in acidic organelles like lysosomes. While neutral forms of these compounds cross membranes easily, their protonated (charged) forms become trapped inside lysosomes, leading to concentrations up to 1000 times higher than outside the cell. This "acid trapping" or "proton pump" effect can be predicted using mathematical models.

Many approved drugs, including haloperidol, levomepromazine, and amantadine, exhibit lysosomotropic behavior. This helps explain their high tissue-to-blood concentration ratios and prolonged tissue retention, though fat solubility also contributes.

Some lysosomotropic drugs can interfere with lysosomal enzymes like acid sphingomyelinase. Ambroxol, a mucolytic, promotes lysosomal exocytosis by neutralizing lysosomal pH and releasing stored calcium. This action may underlie its observed benefits in diseases linked to lysosomal dysfunction, including Parkinson's disease and lysosomal storage disorders.

=== Systemic lupus erythematosus (Lupus) ===
Systemic lupus erythematosus (SLE), otherwise known as lupus, is an autoimmune disease where the immune system attacks healthy cells. Lupus is prominent in systemic lupus erythematosus preventing macrophages and monocytes from degrading neutrophil extracellular traps and immune complexes. The failure to degrade internalized immune complexes rises from irregularly extended activity of mTORC2, which impairs lysosome acidification. As a result, immune complexes in the lysosome recycle to the surface of macrophages causing an accumulation of DNA fragments and nuclear complexes which triggers an immune response from the body which is leads to the multiple lupus-associated pathologies.

== Different types of enzymes present in lysosomes ==
There are over 50 different types of hydrolytic enzymes in lysosomes, the table below shows a few of the main types and their substrates. It is important to keep in mind that each category below has multiple different types of enzymes.

| Sr. No | Enzymes | Substrate |
|---|---|---|
| 1 | Proteases | Proteins and Peptides (breaks peptide bonds) |
| 2 | Nucleases | DNA and RNA (cleaves phosphodiester bonds) |
| 3 | Glycosidases | Carbohydrates (breaks glycosidic bonds) |
| 4 | Lipases | Lipids (breaks ester bonds) |
| 5 | Phospholipases | Phospholipids (cleaves fatty acids from phospholipids) |
| 7 | Phosphatases | Phosphorylated molecules (removes phosphate groups) |
| 8 | Sulfatases | Sulfated molecules (removes sulphate groups) |

== See also ==
- Peroxisome
- Cathelicidin
- Antimicrobial peptides
- Innate immune system
- TMEM106B
- Endosomes
