= Cedarlane Laboratories =

Canadian private corporation

Cedarlane
- Company type: Private
- Industry: Biotechnology
- Founded: 1957
- Founder: Richard Course
- Headquarters: Burlington, Ontario, Canada
- Area served: Worldwide
- Products: Lympholyte; CELLECT; Research Reagents; CELLutions Cell Lines
- Services: Antibody Production; Cell Separation; Diagnostic Test Kits; Life Science Tools
- Number of employees: 100+ (2016)
- Divisions: Reagents; CELLutions; Diagnostics; Shipping Supplies; Culinary
- Website: www.cedarlanelabs.com

Cedarlane is a Canadian private corporation headquartered in Burlington, Ontario, Canada, that manufactures and distributes life science research products. Cedarlane's manufactured products include monoclonal antibodies, polyclonal antibodies, cell separation media, complement for tissue typing, and immunocolumns. Cedarlane is an ISO 9001:2008 and ISO 13485:2003 registered company. Cedarlane has become a multi-national corporation with over 100 employees in Canada and the United States. The two main locations are in Burlington, Ontario, Canada and coincidentally, in Burlington, North Carolina, US.

In recent years, Cedarlane has partnered with a number of charitable Canadian organizations to raise funding for cancer research, economically impoverished children, men's health initiatives and other causes. Cedarlane has partnered with the likes of the Canadian Cancer Society, Canadian Breast Cancer Foundation, SickKids Foundation, and others.

== History ==
Cedarlane was incorporated in 1975 by three Canadian researchers originating from the University of Toronto and Ontario Cancer Institute; Dr. S. Abrahams, Dr. A.J. Farmilo and R.C. Course.

In 2006, Cedarlane opened a branch office in Burlington, North Carolina, in the United States.

In July 2007, Cedarlane became the exclusive distributor of ATCC products in Canada. In November, Cedarlane acquired CELLutions Biosystems Inc., a company founded by the University of Toronto Innovations Foundation.

== Products ==
Cedarlane sells density-gradient cell separation media under the Lympholyte trade name.

Cedarlane offers cell line platforms and various marker details (under CELLutions™) for academic and commercial research programs.

Cedarlane also distributes over 5 million products on behalf of more than 1400 global Life Science manufacturing companies.
