= Density gradient =

Density gradient is a spatial variation in density over a region. The term is used in the natural sciences to describe varying density of matter, but can apply to any quantity whose density can be measured.

== Aerodynamics ==
In the study of supersonic flight, Schlieren photography observes the density gradient of air as it interacts with aircraft.

Also in the field of Computational Fluid Dynamics, Density gradient is used to observe the acoustic waves, shock waves or expansion waves in the flow field.

== Water ==
A steep density gradient in a body of water can have the effect of trapping energy and preventing convection, such a gradient is employed in solar ponds. In the case of salt water, sharp gradients can lead to stratification of different concentrations of salinity. This is called a Halocline.

== Biology ==
In the life sciences, a special technique called density gradient separation is used for isolating and purifying cells, viruses and subcellular particles. Variations of this include Isopycnic centrifugation, Differential centrifugation, and Sucrose gradient centrifugation. A blood donation technique called Pheresis involves density gradient separation.

== Geophysics ==
The understanding of what is at the centre of the earth, the earth core, requires the framework of density gradients in which elements and compounds then interact. The existence of a fast breeder nuclear reactor system at the core of the earth is one theory by reason of density gradient.

A popular model for the density gradient of Earth is one given by the Preliminary Reference Earth Model (PREM) that is based on the observed oscillations of the planet and the travel times of thousands of seismic waves.

Several models for density gradient have been built on the basis of PREM but they acknowledge that the "distribution of density as a function of position within the Earth is much less well constrained than the seismic velocities. The primary information comes from the mass and moment of inertia of the Earth and this information alone requires that there be a concentration of mass towards the centre of the globe. Additional information is to be found in the frequencies of the graver normal modes of the Earth which are sensitive to density through self-gravitation effects induced in deformation".

== Urban economics ==
In the study of population, the density gradient can refer to the change in density in an urban area from the center to the periphery.

== See also ==
- Density current
