= Jerome Vinograd =

American biochemist (1913–1976)

Jerome Rubin Vinograd
- Born: February 9, 1913; Milwaukee, Wisconsin
- Died: July 7, 1976 (aged 63)
- Education: University of Minnesota; University of California, Los Angeles
- Known for: Density gradient ultracentrifugation DNA supercoiling
- Awards: Kendall Award
- Scientific career
- Fields: Biochemistry
- Workplaces: California Institute of Technology
- Doctoral advisor: James William McBain

Jerome Rubin Vinograd (February 9, 1913 – July 7, 1976) was an American biochemist who developed density gradient ultracentrifugation and analytical band centrifugation, and contributed to the understanding of DNA supercoiling.

== Education ==
Vinograd obtained his undergraduate degree in chemistry from the University of Minnesota. From 1931 to 1933 he studied colloid chemistry with Professor Herbert Freundlich at the University of Berlin, and from 1933 to 1935 continued his studies with Freundlich at University College, London. In 1936 he went to the University of California, Los Angeles and obtained a Master of Arts degree in organic chemistry with Professor William G. Young. In 1937 he married Sherna Shalett. He obtained his Ph.D. in chemistry in 1940 with Professor James W. McBain at Stanford University with research on physical and colloid chemistry.

== Career ==
From 1941 to 1951, Vinograd worked for the Shell Development Company in Emeryville, California. During this period, his wife Sherna gave birth to their two daughters, Julia and Deborah. In 1951 he became a senior research fellow at the California Institute of Technology, in Pasadena, California, where he remained for the rest of his career. In 1956 he became a research associate, and in 1965 he was promoted to professor of chemistry and biology. He pioneered the use of ultracentrifugation for the analysis of complex molecules, in particular DNA.

== Awards and honors ==
In 1968, Vinograd was elected to the National Academy of Sciences. In 1970 he received the Kendall Award from the American Chemical Society. In 1972, the Helen Hay Whitney Foundation gave him the T. Duckett Jones Award. He was invited to give a number of honorary lectures, including the Burroughs Wellcome Lecture at Harvard in 1970, the Jesse W. Beams Lecture at the University of Virginia in 1972, and the Falk-Plaut Lecture at Columbia University in 1972.
