= Sedimentation rate =

Sedimentation rate may refer to:

- Erythrocyte sedimentation rate, a medical test for inflammation
- Rate of sedimentation (geology), thickness of sediment accumulated per unit time
- Sedimentation rate of particles in a liquid, described by Stokes' law

== See also ==
- Sedimentation coefficient
