= Sedimentation coefficient =

Tendency of a particle to settle out of suspension during centrifugation

In chemistry, the sedimentation coefficient (s) of a particle characterizes its sedimentation (tendency to settle out of suspension) during centrifugation. It is defined as the ratio of a particle's sedimentation velocity to the applied acceleration causing the sedimentation.
$$s = \frac{v_t}{a}$$

The sedimentation speed v_{t} is also the terminal velocity. It is constant because the force applied to a particle by gravity or by a centrifuge (typically in multiples of tens of thousands of gravities in an ultracentrifuge) is balanced by the viscous resistance (or "drag") of the fluid (normally water) through which the particle is moving. The applied acceleration a can be either the gravitational acceleration g, or more commonly the centrifugal acceleration ω^{2}r. In the latter case, ω is the angular velocity of the rotor and r is the distance of a particle to the rotor axis (radius).

The viscous resistance for a spherical particle is given by Stokes' law:
$$F_d = 6\pi\eta r_0 v$$
where η is the viscosity of the medium, r_{0} is the radius of the particle and v is the velocity of the particle. Stokes' law applies to small spheres in an infinite amount of fluid at the small Reynolds Number limit.

The centrifugal force is given by the equation:
$$F_c = mr\omega^2$$
where m is the excess mass of the particle over and above the mass of an equivalent volume of the fluid in which the particle is situated (see Archimedes' principle) and r is the distance of the particle from the axis of rotation. When the two opposing forces, viscous and centrifugal, balance, the particle moves at constant (terminal) velocity. The terminal velocity for a spherical particle is given by the equation:

$$v_t = \frac{mr\omega^2}{6\pi \eta r_0}$$

Rearranging this equation gives the final formula:

$$s = \frac{v_t}{r\omega^2} = \frac{m}{6\pi \eta r_0}$$

The sedimentation coefficient has units of time, expressed in svedbergs. One svedberg is 10^{−13} s. The sedimentation coefficient normalizes the sedimentation rate of a particle to its applied acceleration. The result no longer depends on acceleration, but only on the properties of the particle and the fluid in which it is suspended. Sedimentation coefficients quoted in literature usually pertain to sedimentation in water at 20 °C.

The sedimentation coefficient is in fact the amount of time it would take the particle to reach its terminal velocity under the given acceleration if there were no drag.

The above equation shows that s is proportional to m and inversely proportional to r_{0}. Also for non-spherical particles of a given shape, s is proportional to m and inversely proportional to some characteristic dimension with units of length.

For a given shape, m is proportional to the size to the third power, so larger, heavier particles sediment faster and have higher svedberg, or s, values. Sedimentation coefficients are, however, not additive. When two particles bind together, the shape will be different from the shapes of the original particles. Even if the shape were the same, the ratio of excess mass to size would not be equal to the sum of the ratios for the starting particles. Thus, when measured separately they have svedberg values that do not add up to that of the bound particle. For example ribosomes are typically identified by their sedimentation coefficient. The 70 S ribosome from bacteria has a sedimentation coefficient of 70 svedberg, although it is composed of a 50 S subunit and a 30 S subunit.

== Dependence on concentration ==
The sedimentation coefficient is typically dependent on the concentration of the solute (i.e. a macromolecular solute such as a protein). Despite 80+ years of study, there is not yet a consensus on the way to perfectly model this relationship while also taking into account all possible non-ideal terms to account for the diverse possible sizes, shapes, and densities of molecular solutes. But in most simple cases, one of two equations can be used to describe the relationship between the sedimentation coefficient and the solute concentration:

$$\frac 1 s = \frac{1}{s^\circ} (1 + k_s c)$$

- s° denotes the sedimentation coefficient of the solute at "infinite" dilution
- s denotes the solute's sedimentation coefficient at a given concentration.
- k_{s}, sometimes called the “Gralen coefficient” (after its use in the PhD thesis of the biochemist Nils Gralén), varies based on the shape & dynamics of the solute in question (including its propensity for self-to-self association, aggregation, or oligomerization). Generally speaking, it is about 0.008 L/g (mL/mg) for a typical globular protein.
- c is the concentration of the protein, in the reciprocal units to k_{s}.

For compact and symmetrical macromolecular solutes (i.e. globular proteins), a weaker dependence of the sedimentation coefficient vs concentration allows adequate accuracy through an approximated form of the previous equation:

$$s = s^\circ (1 - k_s c)$$

During a single ultracentrifuge experiment, the sedimentation coefficient of compounds with a significant concentration dependence changes over time. Using the differential equation for the ultracentrifuge, s may be expressed as following power series in time for any particular relation between s and c.

$s_t=s_i(1+at+ bt^2 +...)$

- s_{t} is the sedimentation coefficient at time t
- s_{i} is the sedimentation coefficient corresponding to the concentration of the initial solution.

== See also ==
- Clearing factor
- Svedberg
- Sedimentation
- Centrifugation
- Differential centrifugation
