= SnRNA-seq =

RNA sequencing of isolated and/or microdissected cell nuclei

snRNA-seq, also known as single nucleus RNA sequencing, single nuclei RNA sequencing or sNuc-seq, is an RNA sequencing method for profiling gene expression in cells which are difficult to isolate, such as those from tissues that are archived or which are hard to be dissociated. It is an alternative to single cell RNA seq (scRNA-seq), as it analyzes nuclei instead of intact cells.

snRNA-seq minimizes the occurrence of spurious gene expression, as the localization of fully mature ribosomes to the cytoplasm means that any mRNAs of transcription factors that are expressed after the dissociation process cannot be translated, and thus their downstream targets cannot be transcribed. Additionally, snRNA-seq technology enables the discovery of new cell types which would otherwise be difficult to isolate.

== Methods and technology ==
The basic snRNA-seq method requires 4 main steps: tissue processing, nuclei isolation, cell sorting, and sequencing. In order to isolate and sequence RNA inside the nucleus, snRNA-seq involves using a quick and mild nuclear dissociation protocol. This protocol allows for minimization of technical issues that can affect studies, especially those concerned with immediate early gene (IEG) behavior.

The resulting dissociated cells are suspended and the suspension gently lysed, allowing the cell nuclei to be separated from their cytoplasmic lysates using centrifugation. These separated nuclei/cells are sorted using fluorescence-activated cell sorting (FACS) into individual wells, and amplified using microfluidics machinery. Sequencing occurs as normal and the data can be analyzed as appropriate for its use. This basic snRNA-seq methodology is capable of profiling RNA from tissues that are preserved or cannot be dissociated, but it does not have high throughput capability due to its reliance on nuclei sorting by FACS. This technique cannot be scaled easily to profiling large numbers of nuclei or samples. Massively parallel scRNA-seq methods exist and can be readily scaled but their requirement of a single cell suspension as input is not ideal and eliminates some of the flexibility that is available with the snRNA-seq method in regards to the types of tissues and cells that can be examined. In response, the DroNc-Seq method of massively parallel snRNA-seq with droplet technology was developed by researchers from the Broad Institute of MIT and Harvard. In this technique, nuclei that have been isolated from their fixed or frozen tissue are encapsulated in droplets with uniquely barcoded beads that are coated with oligonucleotides containing a 30-terminal deoxythymine (dT) stretch. This coating captures the polyadenylated mRNA content produced when the nuclei are lysed inside the droplets. The captured mRNA is reverse transcribed into cDNA after emulsion breakage. Sequencing this cDNA produces the transcriptomes of all the single nuclei being looked at and these can be used for many purposes, including identification of unique cell types.

The sequencing tools and equipment used in scRNA-seq can be used with modifications for snRNA-seq experiments. Illumina outlines a workflow for the basic snRNA-seq method which can be performed with existing equipment. DroNc-Seq can be accomplished with microfluidic platforms which are meant for the Drop-seq scRNA-seq method. However, Dolomite Bio has adapted one of their instruments, the automated Nadia platform for scRNA-seq, to be used natively for DroNc-Seq as well. This instrument could simplify the generation of single nuclei sequencing libraries, as it is being used for its intended purpose.

In regard to data analysis after sequencing, a computational pipeline known as dropSeqPipe was developed by the McCarroll Lab at Harvard. Although the pipeline was originally developed for use with Drop-seq scRNA-seq data, it can be used with DroNc-Seq data as it also utilizes droplet technology.

== Difference between snRNA-seq and scRNA-seq ==
snRNA-seq uses isolated nuclei instead of the entire cells to profile gene expression. That is to say, scRNA-seq measures both cytoplasmic and nuclear transcripts, while snRNA-seq mainly measures nuclear transcripts (though some transcripts might be attached to the rough endoplasmic reticulum and partially preserved in nuclear preps). This allows for snRNA-seq to process only the nucleus and not the entire cell. For this reason, compared to scRNA-seq, snRNA-Seq is more appropriate to profile gene expression in cells that are difficult to isolate (e.g. adipocytes, neurons), as well as preserved tissues.

Additionally, the nuclei required for snRNA-seq can be obtained quickly and easily from fresh, lightly fixed, or frozen tissues, whereas isolating single cells for single-cell RNA-seq (scRNA-seq) involves extended incubations and processing. This gives researchers the ability to obtain transcriptomes which are not as perturbed during isolation.

== Application ==
In neuroscience, neurons have an interconnected nature which makes it extremely hard to isolate intact single neurons. As snRNA-seq has emerged as an alternative method of assessing a cell's transcriptome through the isolation of single nuclei, it has been possible to conduct single-neuron studies from postmortem human brain tissue. snRNA-seq has also enabled the first single neuron analysis of immediate early gene expression (IEGs) associated with memory formation in the mouse hippocampus. In 2019, Dmitry et al used the method on cortical tissue from ASD (Autism Spectrum Disorder) patients to identify ASD-associated transcriptomic changes in specific cell types, which is the first cell-type-specific transcriptome assessment in brains affected by ASD.

Outside of neuroscience, snRNA-seq has also been used in other research areas. In 2019, Haojia et al compared both scRNA-seq and snRNA-seq in a genomic study around the kidney. They found snRNA-seq accomplishes an equivalent gene detection rate to that of scRNA-seq in adult kidney with several significant advantages (including compatibility with frozen samples, reduced dissociation bias and so on ). In 2019, Joshi et al used snRNA-seq in a human lung biology study in which they found snRNA-seq allowed unbiased identification of cell types from frozen healthy and fibrotic lung tissues. Adult mammalian heart tissue can be extremely hard to dissociate without damaging cells, which does not allow for easy sequencing of the tissue. However, in 2020, German scientists presented the first report of sequencing an adult mammalian heart by using snRNA-seq and were able to provide practical cell‐type distributions within the heart

== Pros and cons of snRNA-seq ==
=== Pros ===
1. In scRNA-seq, the dissociation process may impair some sensitive cells and some cells in certain tissues (e.g. collagenous matrix) can be extremely hard to dissociate. Such issues can be prevented in snRNA-seq as we only need to isolate a single nucleus instead of an entire single cell.
2. Unlike scRNA-seq, snRNA-seq has quick and mild nuclei dissociation protocols that would forestall technical issues emerging from heating, protease digestion.
3. snRNA-seq works very well for preserved/frozen tissues.

=== Cons ===
1. Sequencing RNA in the cytoplasm (gene isoforms, RNA in mitochondria and chloroplast etc.) is not possible, as snRNA-seq mostly measures nuclear transcripts.
