= Pierre Van Rysselberghe =

Belgian American chemist

Pierre van Rysselberghe
- Born: May 18, 1905; Brussels, Belgium
- Died: August 21, 1977 (aged 72); Palo Alto
- Education: Université libre de Bruxelles; Stanford University
- Scientific career
- Fields: Electrochemistry
- Workplaces: University of Oregon; Stanford University
- Doctoral advisor: James William McBain

Pierre Van Rysselberghe (May 18, 1905 – August 21, 1977) was a Belgian-American chemist who contributed significantly to the field of electrochemistry.

== Biography ==
Rysselberghe was born in Brussels in 1905. He studied engineering at the L'École polytechnique de Bruxelles (today part of the Université libre de Bruxelles). He moved to the United States for graduate studies, receiving a PhD in chemistry from Stanford University in 1930 under the supervision of James William McBain. He became an assistant professor at Stanford the following year and moved to the University of Oregon in 1941, where he helped rebuild the chemistry department following its closure in the 1932. In 1956 he returned to Stanford, where he remained until his retirement in 1970.

Rysselberghe met his wife Lily at Stanford, who was studying bacteriology at the same time as he was doing his PhD. They had at least three children. He died in 1977 following a lengthy illness.

== Scientific career ==
Rysselsberghe focused on irreversible electrochemical processes for most of his life, particularly corrosion and electrolysis. He also contributed to the development of kinetic and thermodynamic theories of electrochemistry.

In the 1940s and 1950s, Rysselberghe and his student Paul Delahy collaborated with his former classmate Marcel Pourbaix to study the stability of various oxidation states of lead and silver, which later became part of Pourbaix's project to create potential-pH diagrams of a large number of elements.

In 1949, Rysselberghe, together with several of his European colleagues, co-founded and served as the first president of the International Committee of Electrochemical Thermodynamics and Kinetics, which later became the International Society of Electrochemistry. Rysselberghe also contributed to the standardization of modern electrochemical nomenclature by the International Union of Pure and Applied Chemistry.

Rysselberghe was nominated for the Nobel Prize in Chemistry in 1961.
