= James William McBain =

James William McBain FRS
- Portrait by Walter Stoneman, 1926
- Born: March 22, 1882; Chatham, New Brunswick
- Died: March 12, 1953 (aged 70)
- Education: University of Toronto; Heidelberg University
- Known for: Colloidal chemistry
- Awards: Davy Medal (1939)
- Scientific career
- Fields: Chemistry
- Institutions: Stanford University; Bristol University
- Thesis: Zur Kenntnis der Katalyse in heterogenen Systemen: die Zersetzung des chromochlorürs mit kolloidem Platin (1909)
- Doctoral advisor: Georg Hermann Quincke
- Doctoral students: Jerome Vinograd; Pierre Van Rysselberghe

James William McBain FRS (March 22, 1882 – March 12, 1953) was a Canadian chemist.

He gained a Master of Arts at Toronto University and a Doctor of Science at Heidelberg University.

He carried out pioneering work in the area of micelles at the University of Bristol. As early as 1913 he postulated the existence of "colloidal ions", now known as micelles, to explain the good electrolytic conductivity of sodium palmitate solutions. He was elected a Fellow of the Royal Society in May 1923 He won their Davy Medal in 1939.
