= Centrifugation =

Mechanical process

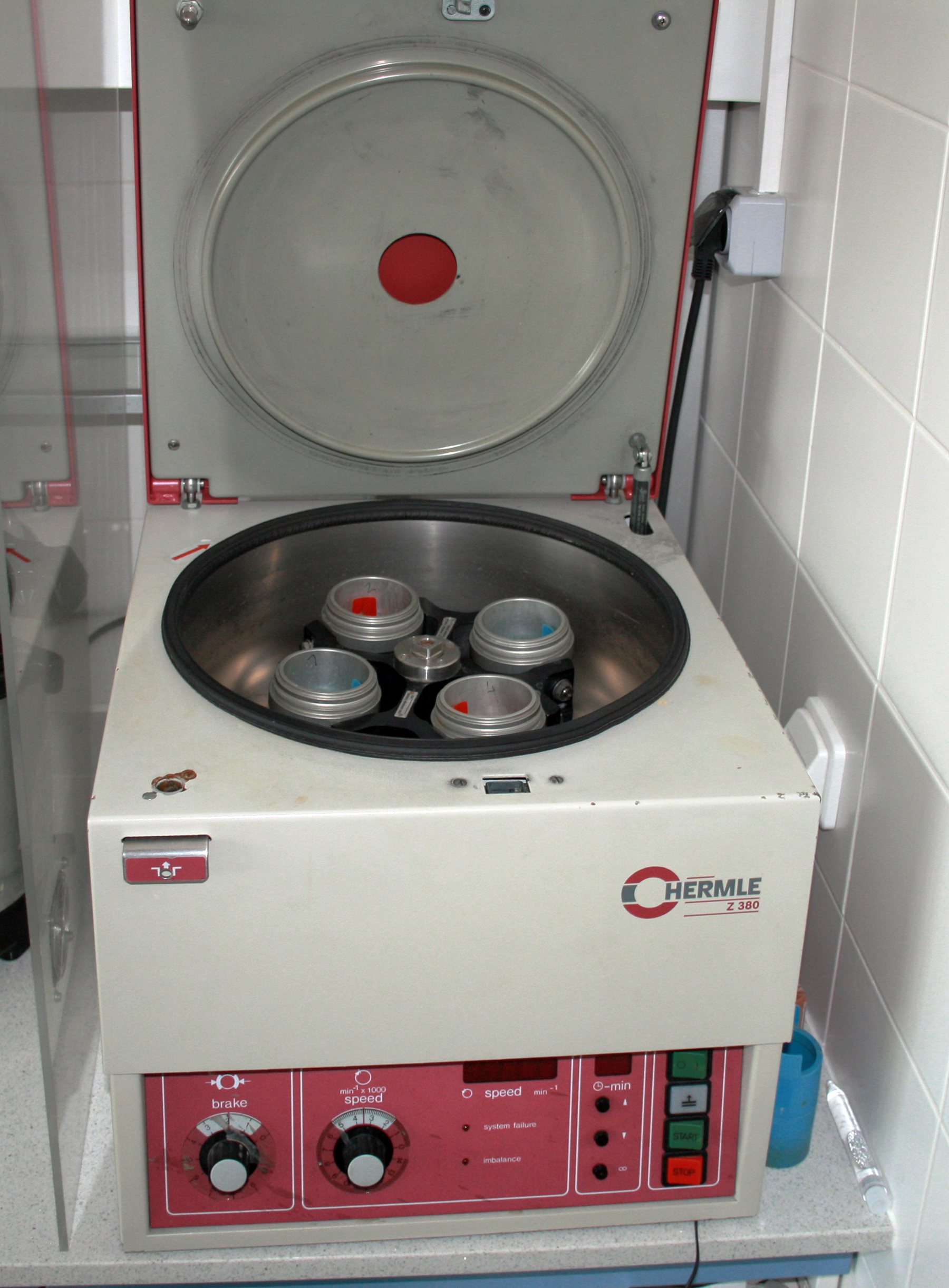
Laboratory centrifuge

Centrifugation is a mechanical process that involves the use of the centrifugal force to separate particles from a solution according to their size, shape, density, medium viscosity and rotor speed. The denser components of the mixture migrate away from the axis of the centrifuge, while the less dense components of the mixture migrate towards the axis. Chemists and biologists may increase the effective gravitational force of the test tube so that the precipitate (pellet) will travel quickly and fully to the bottom of the tube. The remaining liquid that lies above the precipitate is called a supernatant or supernate.

There is a correlation between the size and density of a particle and the rate that the particle separates from a heterogeneous mixture, when the only force applied is that of gravity. The larger the size and the larger the density of the particles, the faster they separate from the mixture. By applying a larger effective gravitational force to the mixture, like a centrifuge does, the separation of the particles is accelerated. This is ideal in industrial and lab settings because particles that would naturally separate over a long period of time can be separated in much less time.

The rate of centrifugation is specified by the angular velocity usually expressed as revolutions per minute (RPM), or acceleration expressed as g. The conversion factor between RPM and g depends on the radius of the centrifuge rotor. The particles' settling velocity in centrifugation is a function of their size and shape, centrifugal acceleration, the volume fraction of solids present, the density difference between the particle and the liquid, and the viscosity. The most common application is the separation of solid from highly concentrated suspensions, which is used in the treatment of sewage sludges for dewatering where less consistent sediment is produced.

The centrifugation method has a wide variety of industrial and laboratorial applications; not only is this process used to separate two miscible substances, but also to analyze the hydrodynamic properties of macromolecules. It is one of the most important and commonly used research methods in biochemistry, cell and molecular biology. In the chemical and food industries, special centrifuges can process a continuous stream of particle turning into separated liquid like plasma. Centrifugation is also the most common method used for uranium enrichment, relying on the slight mass difference between atoms of U-238 and U-235 in uranium hexafluoride gas.

== Mathematical formula ==
In a liquid suspension, many particles or cells will gradually fall to the bottom of the container due to gravity; however, this may take an unacceptably long time. Other particles, which are very small, cannot be isolated at all in solution unless they are exposed to a high centrifugal force. As the suspension is rotated at a certain speed (revolutions per minute, RPM), the centrifugal force allows the particles to travel radially away from the rotation axis. The general formula for calculating the revolutions per minute (RPM) of a centrifuge is:

$RPM= \sqrt{g \over r}$,

where g represents the relative centrifugal acceleration (RCF) and r the radius from the center of the rotor to a point in the sample (and the result is multiplied by 60 to convert from seconds to minutes).

However, depending on the centrifuge model used, the angle of the rotor and the radius may both vary, thus the formula gets modified. For example, the Sorvall #SS-34 rotor has a maximum radius of 10.8 cm, so the formula becomes $RPM= 299\sqrt{g \over r}$, which can further simplify to $RPM = 91\sqrt{g}$.

When compared to gravity, the particle force is called the 'Relative Centrifugal Force' (RCF). It is the perpendicular force exerted on the contents of the rotor as a result of the rotation, always relative to the gravity of the Earth, which measures the strength of rotors of different types and sizes. For instance, the RCF of 1000 x g means that the centrifugal force is 1000 times stronger than the Earth's gravitational force. RCF is dependent on the speed of rotation in rpm and the distance of the particles from the center of rotation. The most common formula used for calculating RCF is:

$RCF = 1.118 \times 10^{-5} \times r \times (rpm)^2$,

where $1.118 \times 10^{-5}$ is a constant empirical factor; r is the radius, expressed in centimetres, between the axis of rotation and a point in the sample; and rpm is the speed in revolutions per minute.

Historically, many separations have been carried out at the speed of 3000 rpm; a rough guide to the ‘g’ force exerted at this speed is to multiply the centrifugation radius by a factor of 10, so a radius of 160 mm gives approximately 1600 x g. This is a rather arbitrary approach, since the RCF applied is linearly dependent on the radius, so a 10% larger radius means that a 10% higher RCF is applied at the same speed. Roughly, the above formula can be simplified to $RCF = 10 \times r$, with an error of only 0.62%.

== Centrifugation in biological research ==
=== Microcentrifuges ===
Microcentrifuges are specially designed table-top models with light, small-volume rotors capable of very fast acceleration up to approximately 17,000 rpm. They are lightweight devices which are primarily used for short-time centrifugation of samples up to around 0.2–2.0 mL. However, due to their small scale, they are readily transportable and, if necessary, can be operated in a cold room. They can be refrigerated or not. The microcentrifuge is normally used in research laboratories where small samples of biological molecules, cells, or nuclei are required to be subjected to high RCF for relatively short time intervals. Microcentrifuges designed for high-speed operation can reach up to 35,000 rpm, giving RCF up to 30000×g, and are called high-speed microcentrifuges.

=== Low-speed centrifuges ===
Low-speed centrifuges are used to harvest chemical precipitates, intact cells (animal, plant and some microorganisms), nuclei, chloroplasts, large mitochondria and the larger plasma-membrane fragments. Density gradients for purifying cells are also run in these centrifuges. Swinging-bucket rotors tend to be used very widely because of the huge flexibility of sample size through the use of adaptors. These machines have maximum rotor speeds of less than 10 000 rpm and vary from small, bench-top to large, floor-standing centrifuges.

=== High-speed centrifuges ===
High-speed centrifuges are typically used to harvest microorganisms, viruses, mitochondria, lysosomes, peroxisomes and intact tubular Golgi membranes. The majority of the simple pelleting tasks are carried out in fixed angle rotors. Some density-gradient work for purifying cells and organelles can be carried out in swinging-bucket rotors, or in the case of Percoll gradients in fixed-angle rotors. High-speed or superspeed centrifuges can handle larger sample volumes, from a few tens of millilitres to several litres. Additionally, larger centrifuges can also reach higher angular velocities (around 30,000 rpm). The rotors may come with different adapters to hold various sizes of test tubes, bottles, or microtiter plates.

=== Ultracentrifugations ===
Ultracentrifugation makes use of high centrifugal force for studying properties of biological particles at exceptionally high speeds. Current ultracentrifuges can spin to as much as 150,000 rpm (equivalent to 1,000,000 x g). They are used to harvest all membrane vesicles derived from the plasma membrane, endoplasmic reticulum (ER) and Golgi membrane, endosomes, ribosomes, ribosomal subunits, plasmids, DNA, RNA and proteins in fixed-angle rotors. Compared to microcentrifuges or high-speed centrifuges, ultracentrifuges can isolate much smaller particles and, additionally, whilst microcentrifuges and supercentrifuges separate particles in batches (limited volumes of samples must be handled manually in test tubes or bottles), ultracentrifuges can separate molecules in batch or continuous flow systems.

Ultracentrifugation is employed for separation of macromolecules/ligand binding kinetic studies, separation of various lipoprotein fractions from plasma and deprotonisation of physiological fluids for amino acid analysis.

They are the most commonly used centrifuge for the density-gradient purification of all particles except cells, and, whilst swinging buckets have been traditionally used for this purpose, fixed-angle rotors and vertical rotors are also used, particularly for self-generated gradients and can improve the efficiency of separation greatly. There are two kinds of ultracentrifuges: the analytical and the preparative.

==== Analytical ultracentrifugation ====
Analytical ultracentrifugation (AUC) can be used for determination of the properties of macromolecules such as shape, mass, composition, and conformation. It is a commonly used biomolecular analysis technique used to evaluate sample purity, to characterize the assembly and disassembly mechanisms of biomolecular complexes, to determine subunit stoichiometries, to identify and characterize macromolecular conformational changes, and to calculate equilibrium constants and thermodynamic parameters for self-associating and hetero-associating systems. Analytical ultracentrifuges incorporate a scanning visible/ultraviolet light-based optical detection system for real-time monitoring of the sample's progress during a spin.

Samples are centrifuged with a high-density solution such as sucrose, caesium chloride, or iodixanol. The high-density solution may be at a uniform concentration throughout the test tube ("cushion") or a varying concentration ("gradient"). Molecular properties can be modeled through sedimentation velocity analysis or sedimentation equilibrium analysis. During the run, the particle or molecules will migrate through the test tube at different speeds depending on their physical properties and the properties of the solution, and eventually form a pellet at the bottom of the tube, or bands at various heights.

==== Preparative ultracentrifugation ====
Preparative ultracentrifuges are often used for separating particles according to their densities, isolating and/or harvesting denser particles for collection in the pellet, and clarifying suspensions containing particles. Sometimes researchers also use preparative ultracentrifuges if they need the flexibility to change the type of rotor in the instrument. Preparative ultracentrifuges can be equipped with a wide range of different rotor types, which can spin samples of different numbers, at different angles, and at different speeds.

=== Fractionation process ===
In biological research, cell fractionation typically includes the isolation of cellular components while retaining the individual roles of each component. Generally, the cell sample is stored in a suspension which is:

- Buffered—neutral pH, preventing damage to the structure of proteins including enzymes (which could affect ionic bonds)
- Isotonic (of equal water potential)—this prevents water gain or loss by the organelles
- Cool—reducing the overall activity of enzyme released later in the procedure

Centrifugation is the first step in most fractionations. Through low-speed centrifugation, cell debris may be removed, leaving a supernatant preserving the contents of the cell. Repeated centrifugation at progressively higher speeds will fractionate homogenates of cells into their components. In general, the smaller the subcellular component, the greater is the centrifugal force required to sediment it. The soluble fraction of any lysate can then be further separated into its constituents using a variety of methods.

=== Differential centrifugation ===
Differential centrifugation is the simplest method of fractionation by centrifugation, commonly used to separate organelles and membranes found in cells. Organelles generally differ from each other in density and in size, making the use of differential centrifugation, and centrifugation in general, possible. The organelles can then be identified by testing for indicators that are unique to the specific organelles. The most widely used application of this technique is to produce crude subcellular fractions from a tissue homogenate such as that from rat liver. Particles of different densities or sizes in a suspension are sedimented at different rates, with the larger and denser particles sedimenting faster. These sedimentation rates can be increased by using centrifugal force.

A suspension of cells is subjected to a series of increasing centrifugal force cycles to produce a series of pellets comprising cells with a declining sedimentation rate. Homogenate includes nuclei, mitochondria, lysosomes, peroxisomes, plasma membrane sheets and a broad range of vesicles derived from a number of intracellular membrane compartments and also from the plasma membrane, typically in a buffered medium.

=== Density gradient centrifugation ===
Density gradient centrifugation is known to be one of the most efficient methods for separating suspended particles, and is used both as a separation technique and as a method for measuring the density of particles or molecules in a mixture.

It is used to separate particles on the basis of size, shape, and density by using a medium of graded densities. During a relatively short or slow centrifugation, the particles are separated by size, with larger particles sedimenting farther than smaller ones. Over a long or fast centrifugation, particles travel to locations in the gradient where the density of the medium is the same as that of the particle density; (ρp – ρm) → 0. Therefore, a small, dense particle initially sediments less readily than a large, low density particle. The large particles reach their equilibrium density position early, while the small particles slowly migrate across the large particle zone and ultimately take up an equilibrium position deeper into the gradient.

A tube, after being centrifuged by this method, has particles in order of density based on height. The object or particle of interest will reside in the position within the tube corresponding to its density. Nevertheless, some non-ideal sedimentations are still possible when using this method. The first potential issue is the unwanted aggregation of particles, but this can occur in any centrifugation. The second possibility occurs when droplets of solution that contain particles sediment. This is more likely to occur when working with a solution that has a layer of suspension floating on a dense liquid, which in fact have little to no density gradient.

== Other applications ==
A centrifuge can be used to isolate small quantities of solids retained in suspension from liquids, such as in the separation of chalk powder from water. In biological research, it can be used in the purification of mammalian cells, fractionation of subcellular organelles, fractionation of membrane vesicles, fractionation of macromolecules and macromolecular complexes, etc. Centrifugation is used to obtain d-limonene from citrus peels. Centrifugation is used in many different ways in the food industry. For example, in the dairy industry, it is typically used in the clarification and skimming of milk, extraction of cream, production and recovery of casein, cheese production, removing bacterial contaminants, etc. This processing technique is also used in the production of beverages, juices, coffee, tea, beer, wine, soy milk, oil and fat processing/recovery, cocoa butter, sugar production, etc. It is also used in the clarification and stabilization of wine.

In forensic and research laboratories, it can be used in the separation of urine and blood components. It also aids in separation of proteins using purification techniques such as salting out, e.g. ammonium sulfate precipitation. Centrifugation is also an important technique in waste treatment, being one of the most common processes used for sludge dewatering. This process also plays a role in cyclonic separation, where particles are separated from an air-flow without the use of filters. In a cyclone collector, air moves in a helical path. Particles with high inertia are separated by the centrifugal force whilst smaller particles continue with the air-flow.

Centrifuges have also been used to a small degree to isolate lighter-than-water compounds, such as oil. In such situations, the aqueous discharge is obtained at the opposite outlet from which solids with a specific gravity greater than one are the target substances for separation.

== History ==
By 1923 Theodor Svedberg and his student H. Rinde had successfully analyzed large-grained sols in terms of their gravitational sedimentation. Sols consist of a substance evenly distributed in another substance, also known as a colloid. However, smaller grained sols, such as those containing gold, could not be analyzed. To investigate this problem Svedberg developed an analytical centrifuge, equipped with a photographic absorption system, which would exert a much greater centrifugal effect. In addition, he developed the theory necessary to measure molecular weight. During this time, Svedberg's attention shifted from gold to proteins.

By 1900, it had been generally accepted that proteins were composed of amino acids; however, whether proteins were colloids or macromolecules was still under debate. One protein being investigated at the time was hemoglobin. It was determined to have 712 carbon, 1,130 hydrogen, 243 oxygen, two sulfur atoms, and at least one iron atom. This gave hemoglobin a resulting weight of approximately 16,000 dalton (Da) but it was uncertain whether this value was a multiple of one or four (dependent upon the number of iron atoms present).

Through a series of experiments utilizing the sedimentation equilibrium technique, two important observations were made: hemoglobin has a molecular weight of 68,000 Da, suggesting that there are four iron atoms present rather than one, and that, no matter where the hemoglobin was isolated from, it had exactly the same molecular weight. How something of such a large molecular mass could be consistently found, regardless of where it was sampled from in the body, was unprecedented and favored the idea that proteins are macromolecules rather than colloids. In order to investigate this phenomenon, a centrifuge with even higher speeds was needed, and thus the ultracentrifuge was created to apply the theory of sedimentation-diffusion. The same molecular mass was determined, and the presence of a spreading boundary suggested that it was a single compact particle. Further application of centrifugation showed that under different conditions the large homogeneous particles could be broken down into discrete subunits. The development of centrifugation was a great advance in experimental protein science.

Linderstorm-Lang, in 1937, discovered that density gradient tubes could be used for density measurements. He discovered this when working with potato yellow-dwarf virus. This method was also used in Meselson and Stahl's famous experiment in which they proved that DNA replication is semi-conservative by using different isotopes of nitrogen. They used density gradient centrifugation to determine which isotope or isotopes of nitrogen were present in the DNA after cycles of replication.

== See also ==
- Centrifuge

== Sources ==
- Harrison, Roger G., Todd, Paul, Rudge, Scott R., Petrides D.P. Bioseparations Science and Engineering. Oxford University Press, 2003.
- Dishon, M., Weiss, G.H., Yphantis, D.A. Numerical Solutions of the Lamm Equation. I. Numerical Procedure. Biopolymers, Vol. 4, 1966. pp. 449–455.
- Cao, W., Demeler B. Modeling Analytical Ultracentrifugation Experiments with an Adaptive Space-Time Finite Element Solution for Multicomponent Reacting Systems. Biophysical Journal, Vol. 95, 2008. pp. 54–65.
- Howlett, G.J., Minton, A.P., Rivas, G. Analytical Ultracentrifugation for the Study of Protein Association and Assembly. Current Opinion in Chemical Biology, Vol. 10, 2006. pp. 430–436.
- Dam, J., Velikovsky, C.A., Mariuzza R.A., et al. Sedimentation Velocity Analysis of Heterogeneous Protein-Protein Interactions: Lamm Equation Modeling and Sedimentation Coefficient Distributions c(s). Biophysical Journal, Vol. 89, 2005. pp. 619–634.
- Berkowitz, S.A., Philo, J.S. Monitoring the Homogeneity of Adenovirus Preparations (a Gene Therapy Delivery System) Using Analytical Ultracentrifugation. Analytical Biochemistry, Vol. 362, 2007. pp. 16–37.
