= Peripheral blood mononuclear cell =

Blood in circulatory system with round nucleus

A peripheral blood mononuclear cell (PBMC) is any peripheral blood cell having a round nucleus. These cells consist of lymphocytes (T cells, B cells, NK cells) and monocytes, whereas erythrocytes and platelets have no nuclei, and granulocytes (neutrophils, basophils, and eosinophils) have multi-lobed nuclei. In humans, lymphocytes make up the majority of the PBMC population, followed by monocytes, and only a small percentage of dendritic cells.

These cells can be extracted from whole blood using ficoll, a hydrophilic polysaccharide that separates layers of blood, and gradient centrifugation, which will separate the blood into a top layer of plasma, followed by a layer of PBMCs (buffy coat) and a bottom fraction of polymorphonuclear cells (such as neutrophils and eosinophils) and erythrocytes. The polymorphonuclear cells can be further isolated by lysing the red blood cells. Basophils are sometimes found in both the denser and the PBMC fractions.

== Isolation methods ==
The most commonly used isolation method isolating PBMCs from blood is Density-gradient centrifugation. However, there are several alternative methods that are used in research such as cell preparation tubes (CPT), Rosette sep, and immunomagnetic bead-based sorting. Each technique mentioned is used depending on the type of research being conducted they all differ in levels of purity, processing time, and PBMC recovery.

== Clinical significance ==
=== Infections ===
Recent studies indicate that PBMCs may be susceptible to pathogenic infections, such as Ureaplasma parvum and U. urealyticum, Mycoplasma genitalium and M. hominis, and Chlamydia trachomatis infections. PBMCs may be also susceptible to viral infections. Indeed, footprints of JC polyomavirus and Merkel cell polyomavirus have been detected in PBMCs from pregnant women and women affected by spontaneous abortion.

Previous proteomic studies also suggest that PBMCs may be used for diagnostics or as biomarkers for diseases or disorders. PBMCs contain proteomic profiles that are associated with immunological responses. Changes in the PBMC proteome can illustrate how many disorders have developed and affected PBMCs over time. Researchers took PBMCs from healthly individuals and compared them to PBMCs present in individuals afflicted by a disease to distinguish between the two proteomic signatures. Many diseases have been examined such as different cancers, neurological disorders, infectious diseases, autoimmunity, chronic inflammation, endocrinal disorders, and physiological conditions.

PBMCs also play a role in regenerative medicine. Previously research has been focused on using stem cell therapies and regeneration from the stem cell secretome. Within the last ten years researchers have found that the PBMC secretome has similar regenerative effects and can be used as an alternative for stem cells. The PBMC secretome contains proteins, lipids, microRNAs, and other extracellular factors that help promote tissue repair and has regenerative effects. Researchers have tested the effects of PBMC secretomes in different patients including those affected by acute myocardial infraction, stroke, chronic heart failure, spinal cord injury, and testing PBMC secretome effects towards wound healing. The PBMC secretome showed promising results in each of the patient cases showing improvements in tissue repair and regenerative properties. In addition to being having regenerative properties PBMCs have been found to have more similarities to stem cells than previously understood. PBMCs have been found to have a similar cell differentiation ability to stem cells. When tested under specified conditions certain PBMCs have the capability to differentiate into different somatic cell types such as epithelial cells, blood cells, and neural cells. The potential for PBMCs to differentiate into many somatic cell types provides further evidence that suggests PBMCs may be the future for regenerative medicine.

== Research uses ==
Many scientists conducting research in the fields of immunology (including autoimmune disorders), infectious disease, hematological malignancies, vaccine development, transplant immunology, and high-throughput screening are frequent users of PBMCs. In many cases, PBMCs are derived from blood banks. PBMC fraction also contains progenitor populations, as demonstrated by methylcellulose based colony forming assays.

PBMCs are widely used in biological research as they include a large section of innate and adaptive immune cells present in the body. These cells are relatively easy to access through blood sample collection and can be used to understand how PBMCs act in different environments to better understand their function. By conducting these studies researchers can better understand immune responses to cancers, diseases, autoimmune response, and the effects of experimental treatments or therapies.

Once PBMCs have been isolated from the blood using gradient centrifugation and ficoll to separate it, they can be cultured and maintained using cryopreservation for different research assays. Some of these experiments include monitoring how PBMCs react to different immune stimuli such as lipopolysaccharides, phytohaemagglutinin, concanavalin A, and pokeweed mitogen. The effects of these experiments are determined by a change in gene expression, lymphocyte production and reviewing what cytokines are released by PBMCs.

PBMCs have been thought to be an important route of vaccination. PBMCs from cancer patients can be extracted and cultured in vitro. Subsequently, PBMCs are challenged with tumor antigens such as tumor stem cell antigen. Inflammatory cytokines are usually added to aid in antigen uptake and recognition by PBMCs.

Due to the fact that PBMCs contain important immune cells they are largely used in research to understand how the immune system responds to different diseases and vaccines. During research studies PBMCs can be isolated using density gradient centrifugation in order to separate the PBMCs from the other blood cells present.
