= Ficoll =

Biochemical molecule

Components of Ficoll

Ficoll is a neutral, highly branched, high-mass, hydrophilic polysaccharide synthesized from repeating sucrose units, which dissolves readily in aqueous solutions. Ficoll radii range from 2 to 7 nm. It is prepared by reaction of the polysaccharide with epichlorohydrin. Ficoll is a registered trademark owned by GE Healthcare companies.

Ficoll is part of Ficoll-Paque, which is used in biology laboratories to separate blood to its components (erythrocytes, leukocytes etc.). Ficoll-Paque is normally placed at the bottom of a conical tube, and blood is then slowly layered above Ficoll-Paque. After being centrifuged, the following layers will be visible in the conical tube, from top to bottom: plasma and other constituents, a layer of mono-nuclear cells called buffy coat (PBMC/MNC), Ficoll-Paque, and erythrocytes and granulocytes, which should be present in pellet form. This separation allows easy harvest of PBMCs. Note that some red blood cell trapping (presence of erythrocytes and granulocytes) may occur in the PBMC or Ficoll-Paque layer. Major blood clotting may sometimes occur in the PBMC layer. Ethylene diamine tetra-acetate (EDTA) and heparin are commonly used in conjunction with Ficoll-Paque(TM) to prevent clotting and is used as a mononuclear cell separator.

At one time, fairly early in the research for diabetes treatment by transplantation, Ficoll was used in an attempt to separate islets of Langerhans from enzyme (collagenase) digested human pancreatic tissue. The theory was that separated islets could then be used for transplantation into patients with type 1 diabetes. In practice, using Ficoll led to difficulty obtaining a pure enough preparation of islets, with enough islet recovery from the original tissue, for safe and effective islet transplantation in humans.

Because Ficoll-Paque layering is a very slow process, devices that aid in the most time-consuming step, the overlay, have been developed. One such product is SepMate-50, a specialized tube containing a porous insert that forms a physical barrier between the Ficoll-Paque and blood sample. This allows the blood sample to be rapidly pipetted onto the insert, avoiding the need for overlaying it directly onto Ficoll-Paque. The SepMate insert also reduces the duration of the centrifugation step, and after centrifugation, the top layer containing plasma and PBMCs can be poured into a new tube. Other devices include a column containing a porous high-density polyethylene barrier or "frit." These products allow blood to be layered on much more quickly without mixing polysaccharide and blood. An example of such a product is the "Accuspin System Histopaque-1077" sold by Sigma Aldrich. The cost of this product is significantly higher than basic Ficoll and Ficoll-Paque products. It is also possible to have the Ficoll-Paque separating system included in the Vacutainer used to collect the blood. Such Vacutainers increase the convenience and safety of collecting blood products, but cost 50 times as much as the basic Vacutainer.

== See also ==
- Percoll
