= Differential centrifugation =

Method of separating particles in a mixture

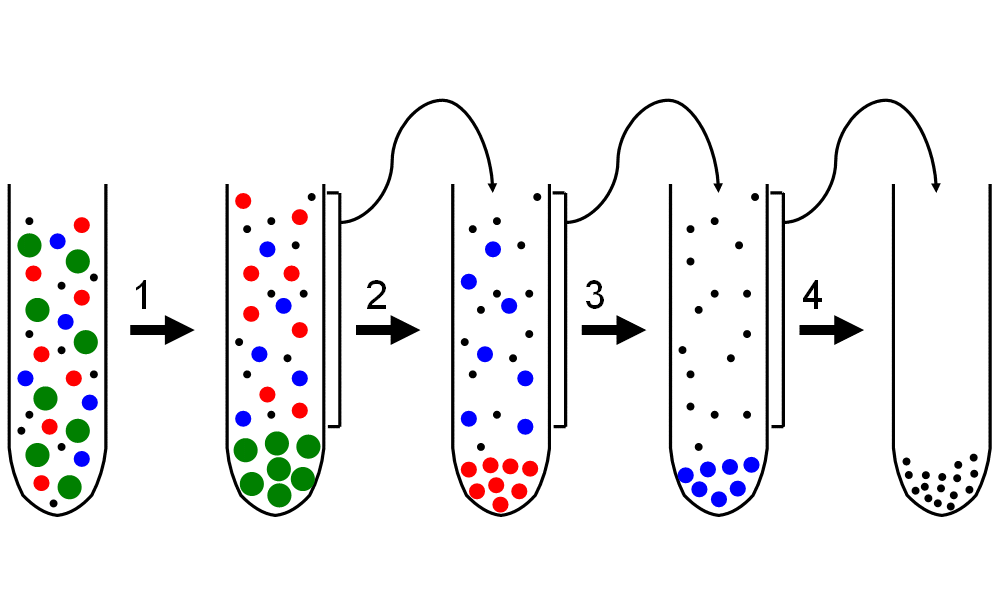
Differential centrifugation

In biochemistry and cell biology, differential centrifugation (also known as differential velocity centrifugation) is a common procedure used to separate organelles and other sub-cellular particles based on their sedimentation rate. Although often applied in biological analysis, differential centrifugation is a general technique also suitable for crude purification of non-living suspended particles (e.g. nanoparticles, colloidal particles, viruses). In a typical case where differential centrifugation is used to analyze cell-biological phenomena (e.g. organelle distribution), a tissue sample is first lysed to break the cell membranes and release the organelles and cytosol. The lysate is then subjected to repeated centrifugations, where particles that sediment sufficiently quickly at a given centrifugal force for a given time form a compact "pellet" at the bottom of the centrifugation tube.

After each centrifugation, the supernatant (non-pelleted solution) is removed from the tube and re-centrifuged at an increased centrifugal force and/or time. Differential centrifugation is suitable for crude separations on the basis of sedimentation rate, but more fine grained purifications may be done on the basis of density through equilibrium density-gradient centrifugation. Thus, the differential centrifugation method is the successive pelleting of particles from the previous supernatant, using increasingly higher centrifugation forces. Cellular organelles separated by differential centrifugation maintain a relatively high degree of normal functioning, as long as they are not subject to denaturing conditions during isolation.

== Theory ==
In a viscous fluid, the rate of sedimentation of a given suspended particle (as long as the particle is denser than the fluid) is largely a function of the following factors:

- Gravitational force
- Difference in density
- Fluid viscosity
- Particle size and shape

Larger particles sediment more quickly and at lower centrifugal forces. If a particle is less dense than the fluid (e.g., fats in water), the particle will not sediment, but rather will float, regardless of strength of the g-force experienced by the particle. Centrifugal force separates components not only on the basis of density, but also of particle size and shape. In contrast, a more specialized equilibrium density-gradient centrifugation produces a separation profile dependent on particle-density alone, and therefore is suitable for more fine-grained separations.

High g-force makes sedimentation of small particles much faster than Brownian diffusion, even for very small (nanoscale) particles. When a centrifuge is used, Stokes' law must be modified to account for the variation in g-force with distance from the center of rotation.

$$D = \sqrt{ \frac{18 \eta \, \ln(R_f/R_i)}{( \rho_p - \rho_f) \omega^2 t} }$$

where

- D is the minimum diameter of the particles expected to sediment (m)
- η (or μ) is the fluid dynamic viscosity (Pa.s)
- R_{f} is the final radius of rotation (m)
- R_{i} is the initial radius of rotation (m)
- ρ_{p} is particle volumetric mass density (kg/m^{3})
- ρ_{f} is the fluid volumetric mass density (kg/m^{3})
- ω is the angular velocity (radian/s)
- t is the time required to sediment from R_{i} to R_{f} (s)

== Procedure ==
Differential centrifugation can be used with intact particles (e.g. biological cells, microparticles, nanoparticles), or used to separate the component parts of a given particle. Using the example of a separation of eukaryotic organelles from intact cells, the cell must first be lysed and homogenized (ideally by a gentle technique, such as Dounce homogenization; harsher techniques or over homogenization will lead to a lower proportion of intact organelles). Once the crude organelle extract is obtained, it may be subjected to a varying centrifugation speeds to separate the organelles:

Typical differential centrifugation parameters for a biological sample (path length of centrifugation ≈1–5 cm)
Sample input	G force	Time	Instrument needed	Pellet contents	Supernatant contents
Unlysed (eukaryotic) cells	100 x g	5 min	Benchtop fixed-angle centrifuge, or swinging bucket centrifuge	Intact (eukaryotic) cells, macroscopic debris	Varies depending on sample
Gently lysed cells (e.g. dounce homogenizer)	600 x g	10 min	Benchtop fixed-angle centrifuge, or swinging bucket centrifuge	Nuclei	Cytosol, non-nuclei organelles
Supernatant of previous row	15,000 x g	20 min	Benchtop fixed-angle centrifuge	Mitochondria, chloroplasts, lysosomes, peroxisomes	Cytosol, microsomes (known as post mitochondrial supernatant)
Supernatant of previous row	50,000 x g - 100,000 x g	60 min	High speed fixed-angle centrifuge, or vacuum ultracentrifuge	Plasma membrane, microsomal fraction, large polyribosomes	Cytosol, ribosomal subunits, small polyribosomes, enzyme complexes
Supernatant of previous row	50,000 x g - 100,000 x g	120 min	Vacuum ultracentrifuge	Ribosomal subunits, small poly ribosomes, some soluble enzyme complexes	Cytosol

== Ultracentrifugation ==
The lysed sample is now ready for centrifugation in an ultracentrifuge. An ultracentrifuge consists of a refrigerated, low-pressure chamber containing a rotor which is driven by an electrical motor capable of high speed rotation. Samples are placed in tubes within or attached to the rotor. Rotational speed may reach up to 100,000 rpm for floor model, 150,000 rpm for bench-top model (Beckman Optima Max-XP or Sorvall MTX150 or himac CS150NX), creating centrifugal speed forces of 800,000g to 1,000,000g. This force causes sedimentation of macromolecules, and can even cause non-uniform distributions of small molecules.

Since different fragments of a cell have different sizes and densities, each fragment will settle into a pellet with different minimum centrifugal forces. Thus, separation of the sample into different layers can be done by first centrifuging the original lysate under weak forces, removing the pellet, then exposing the subsequent supernatants to sequentially greater centrifugal fields. Each time a portion of different density is sedimented to the bottom of the container and extracted, and repeated application produces a rank of layers which includes different parts of the original sample. Additional steps can be taken to further refine each of the obtained pellets.

Sedimentation depends on mass, shape, and partial specific volume of a macromolecule, as well as solvent density, rotor size and rate of rotation. The sedimentation velocity can be monitored during the experiment to calculate molecular weight. Values of sedimentation coefficient (S) can be calculated. Large values of S (faster sedimentation rate) correspond to larger molecular weight. Dense particle sediments more rapidly. Elongated proteins have larger frictional coefficients, and sediment more slowly to ensure accuracy.

== Differences between differential and density gradient centrifugation ==
The difference between differential and density gradient centrifugation techniques is that the latter method uses solutions of different densities (e.g. sucrose, Ficoll, Percoll) or gels through which the sample passes. This separates the sample into layers by relative density, based on the principle that molecules settle down under a centrifugal force until they reach a medium with the density the same as theirs. The degree of separation or number of layers depends on the solution or gel. Differential centrifugation, on the other hand, does not utilize a density gradient, and the centrifugation is taken in increasing speeds. The different centrifugation speeds often create separation into not more than two fractions, so the supernatant can be separated further in additional centrifugation steps. For that, each step the centrifugation speed has to be increased until the desired particles are separated. In contrast, the density gradient centrifugation is usually performed with just one centrifugation speed.

== See also ==
- Buoyant density ultracentrifugation
- Jerome Vinograd
- Svedberg
