= Percoll =

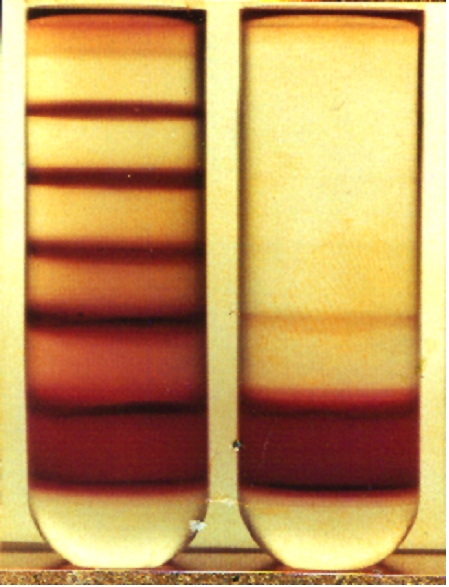
Concentration of Plasmodium falciparum-infected erythrocytes by discontinuous density gradient centrifugation in Percoll

Percoll is a reagent consisting of colloidal silica particles used in cell biology and other laboratory settings. It was first formulated by Pertoft and colleagues, and commercialized by Pharmacia Fine Chemicals. Percoll is used for the isolation of cells, organelles, or viruses by density centrifugation.

Percoll was developed from previously reported uses of colloidal silica nanoparticles coated with polysaccharides or polymers for rate zonal, isopycnic, or equilibrium centrifugal separations. Percoll itself specifically consists of polydisperse silica nanoparticles 15–30 nm diameter (23% w/w in water) which have been coated with polyvinylpyrrolidone (PVP). Percoll is well suited for density gradient experiments because it possesses a low viscosity compared to alternatives, a low osmolarity, and no toxicity towards cells and their constituents.

Percoll is a registered trademark of Cytiva.

== Characteristics ==
Percoll does not notably diffuse over time, resulting in the formation of very stable gradients. Therefore, both discontinuous and continuous Percoll density gradients can be prepared weeks in advance, allowing great reproducibility & ease of use.

== Past use in artificial reproduction ==
Percoll was previously used in assisted reproductive technology (ART) to select sperm from semen by density gradient centrifugation, for use in techniques such as in vitro fertilization or intrauterine insemination. However, in 1996, Pharmacia sent out a letter to laboratories stating that Percoll should be used for research purposes only, not clinical. Pharmacia had not marketed it as a sperm preparation product; it had been repackaged and sold as such by third-party manufacturers. The FDA Warning Letter was due to concerns that PVP might cause damage to sperm (an unknown issue), and also that some batches of Percoll contained high levels of endotoxin (a known issue). The latter concern also applies to the use of Percoll with any other cells that might be injected back into a patient, since endotoxin can cause severe inflammation and fever. Since then it has been replaced with other colloids in the ART industry.
