= Ultracentrifuge =

Centrifuge for spinning a rotor at very high speeds

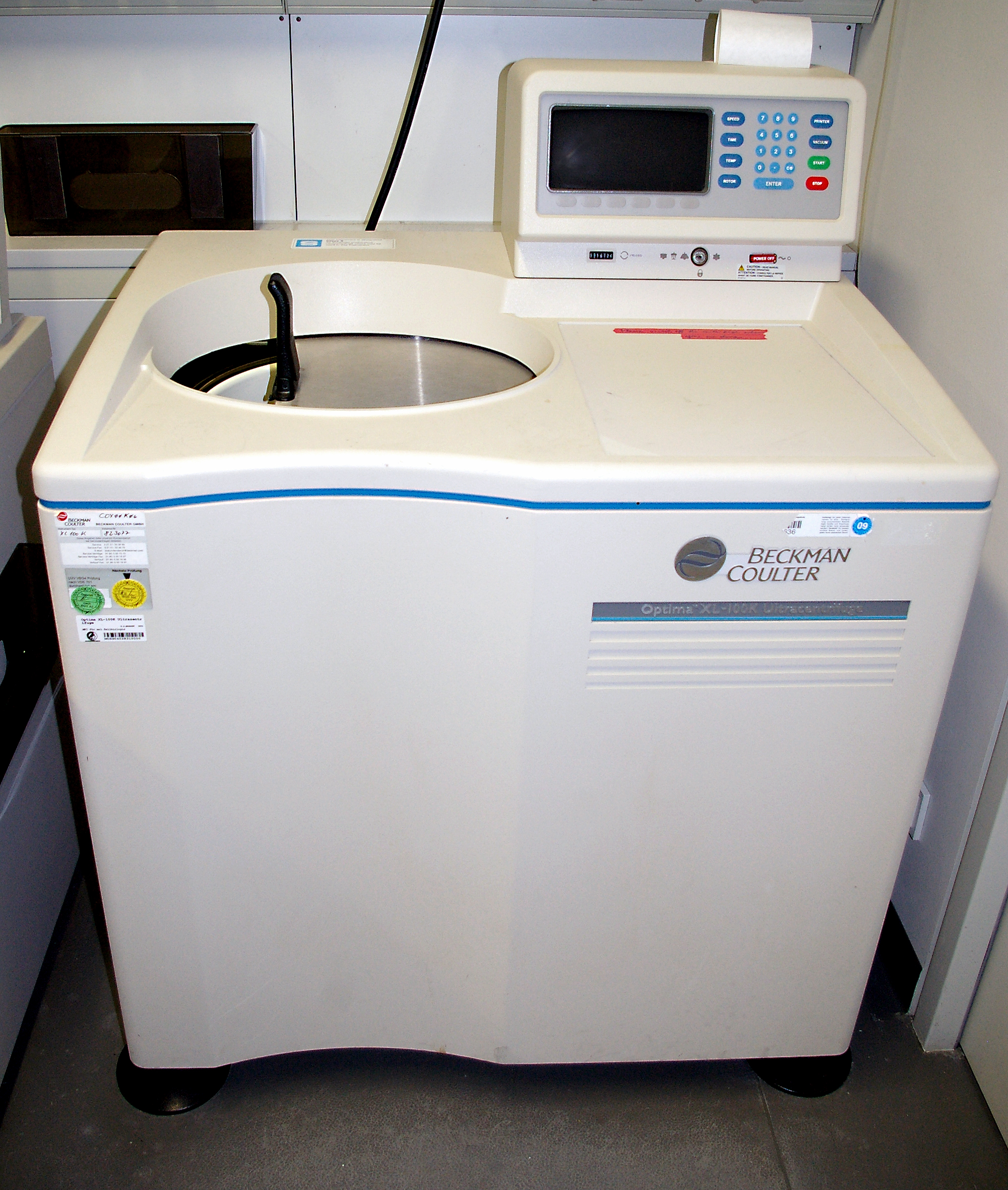
A standard ultracentrifuge by manufacturer Beckman Coulter

An ultracentrifuge is a centrifuge optimized for spinning a rotor at very high speeds, capable of generating acceleration as high as 100 000 g (approx. 1 000 km/s²). There are two kinds of ultracentrifuges, the preparative and the analytical ultracentrifuge. Both classes of instruments find important uses in molecular biology, biochemistry, and polymer science.

== History ==
In 1924 Theodor Svedberg built a centrifuge capable of generating 7,000 g (at 12,000 rpm), and called it the ultracentrifuge, to juxtapose it with the ultramicroscope that had been developed previously. In 1925-1926 Svedberg constructed a new ultracentrifuge that permitted fields up to 100,000 g (42,000 rpm). Modern ultracentrifuges are typically classified as allowing greater than 100,000 g. Svedberg won the Nobel Prize in Chemistry in 1926 for his research on colloids and proteins using the ultracentrifuge.

In early 1930s, Émile Henriot found that suitably placed jets of compressed air can spin a bearingless top to very high speeds and developed an ultracentrifuge on that principle. Jesse Beams from the Physics Department at the University of Virginia first adapted that principle to a high-speed camera, and then started improving Henriot's ultracentrifuge, but his rotors consistently overheated.

Beam's student Edward Greydon Pickels solved the problem in 1935 by vacuumizing the system, which allowed a reduction in friction generated at high speeds. Vacuum systems also enabled the maintenance of constant temperature across the sample, eliminating convection currents that interfered with the interpretation of sedimentation results.

Comparing Serial Numbers 1 and 1000 of Spinco's Model E Analytical Ultracentrifuge, 1965

In 1946, Pickels cofounded Spinco (Specialized Instruments Corp.) to market analytical and preparative ultracentrifuges based on his design. Pickels considered his design to be too complicated for commercial use and developed a more easily operated, “foolproof” version. But even with the enhanced design, sales of analytical centrifuges remained low, and Spinco almost went bankrupt. The company survived by concentrating on sales of preparative ultracentrifuge models, which were becoming popular as workhorses in biomedical laboratories. In 1949, Spinco introduced the Model L, the first preparative ultracentrifuge to reach a maximum speed of 40,000 rpm. In 1954, Beckman Instruments (later Beckman Coulter) purchased the company, forming the basis of its Spinco centrifuge division.

== Instrumentation ==
Ultracentrifuges are available with a wide variety of rotors suitable for a great range of experiments. Most rotors are designed to hold tubes that contain the samples. Swinging bucket rotors allow the tubes to hang on hinges so the tubes reorient to the horizontal as the rotor initially accelerate. Fixed angle rotors are made of a single block of material and hold the tubes in cavities bored at a predetermined angle. Zonal rotors are designed to contain a large volume of sample in a single central cavity rather than in tubes. Some zonal rotors are capable of dynamic loading and unloading of samples while the rotor is spinning at high speed.

Preparative rotors are used in biology for pelleting of fine particulate fractions, such as cellular organelles (mitochondria, microsomes, ribosomes) and viruses. They can also be used for gradient separations, in which the tubes are filled from top to bottom with an increasing concentration of a dense substance in solution. Sucrose gradients are typically used for separation of cellular organelles. Gradients of caesium salts are used for separation of nucleic acids. After the sample has spun at high speed for sufficient time to produce the separation, the rotor is allowed to come to a smooth stop and the gradient is gently pumped out of each tube to isolate the separated components.

== Hazards ==
The tremendous rotational kinetic energy of the rotor in an operating ultracentrifuge makes the catastrophic failure of a spinning rotor a serious concern, as it can explode spectacularly. Rotors conventionally have been made from high strength-to-weight metals such as aluminum or titanium. The stresses of routine use and harsh chemical solutions eventually cause rotors to deteriorate. Proper use of the instrument and rotors within recommended limits and careful maintenance of rotors to prevent corrosion and to detect deterioration is necessary to mitigate this risk.

More recently some rotors have been made of lightweight carbon fiber composite material, which are up to 60% lighter, resulting in faster acceleration/deceleration rates. Carbon fiber composite rotors also are corrosion-resistant, eliminating a major cause of rotor failure.

== See also ==
- Analytical ultracentrifugation
- Buoyant density ultracentrifugation
- Differential centrifugation
- Gas centrifuge
- Theodor Svedberg
- Zippe-type centrifuge
