= Buoyant density centrifugation =

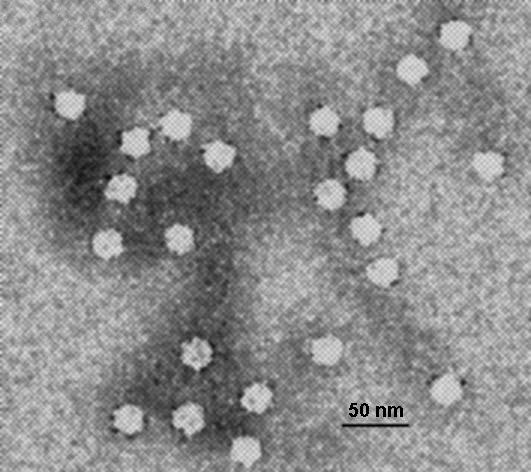
Electron microscope image of canine parvovirus isolated using buoyant density centrifugation

Buoyant density centrifugation (also isopycnic centrifugation or equilibrium density-gradient centrifugation) uses the concept of buoyancy to separate molecules in solution by their differences in density.

== Implementation ==
Historically a cesium chloride (CsCl) solution was often used, but more commonly used density gradients are sucrose or Percoll. This application requires a solution with high density and yet relatively low viscosity, and CsCl suits it because of its high solubility in water, high density owing to the large mass of Cs, as well as low viscosity and high stability of CsCl solutions.

The sample is put on top of the solution, and then the tube is spun at a very high speed for an extended time, at times lasting days. The CsCl molecules become densely packed toward the bottom, so a continuous gradient of layers of different densities (and CsCl concentrations) form. Since the original solution was approximately the same density, they go to a level where their density and the CsCl density are the same, to which they form a sharp, distinctive band.

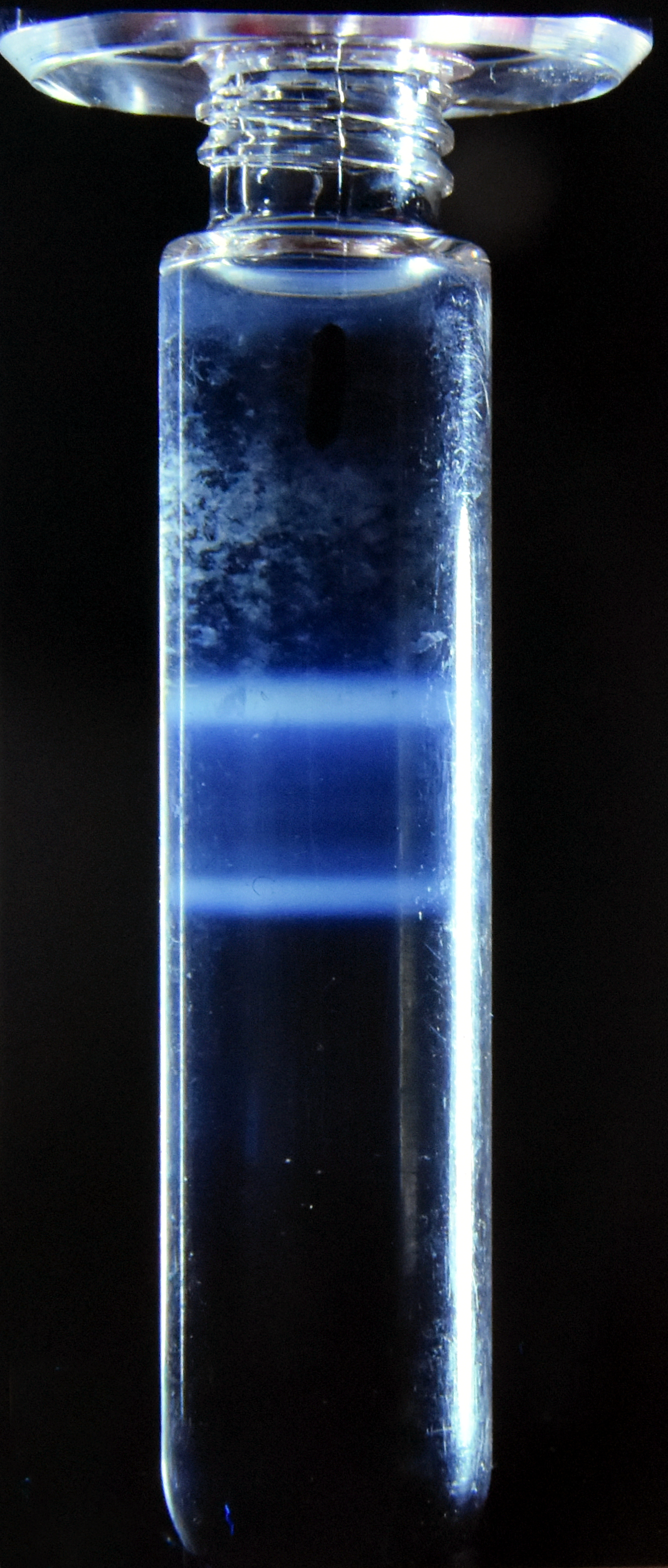
Caesium chloride (CsCl) solution and two morphological types of rotavirus. Following centrifugation at 100 g a density gradient forms in the CsCl solution and the virus particles separate according to their densities.

== Isotope separation ==
This method very sharply separates molecules, and is so sharp that it can even separate different molecular isotopes from one another. It has been utilized in the Meselson-Stahl experiment.

== DNA separation ==
Buoyant density of the majority of DNA is 1.7g/cm^{3} which is equal to the density of 6M CsCl solution. Buoyant density of DNA changes with its GC content. The term "satellite DNA" refers to small bands of repetitive DNA sequences with distinct base composition floating above (A+T rich) or below (G+C rich) the main component DNA.

== See also ==
- Isopycnic
- Satellite DNA
